= Konrad Kügelin =

Konrad Kügelin (1366–1428) was a Roman Catholic monk, provost of the Collegiate Church of St. Peter, Bad Walsee, and hagiographer of Elizabeth of Reute.

He was a Canon Regular of Saint Augustine who lived in Bad Waldsee, Württemberg from 1366 to 1428. He was a strong proponent of the Devotio Moderna reform movement.

Kügelin was the confessor of Elizabeth of Reute, a mystic and stigmatic. After her death, he wrote Das Leben der guten Beth, an account in prose of her life and visions which Kügelin intended for the benefit of the other religious sisters of Reute. In writing it, Kügelin drew heavily on Raymond of Capua's Life of Catherine of Siena, borrowing substantial portions. Originally kept in the convent at Reute, the hagiography was first published in 1881.
