= Rüti railway station =

Rüti railway station may refer to:

- Rüti GL railway station, in the Swiss canton of Glarus
- Rüti ZH railway station, in the Swiss canton of Zurich

== See also ==
- Rüthi SG railway station, in the Swiss canton of St. Gallen
