= Marbach, St. Gallen =

Marbach
- Municipality
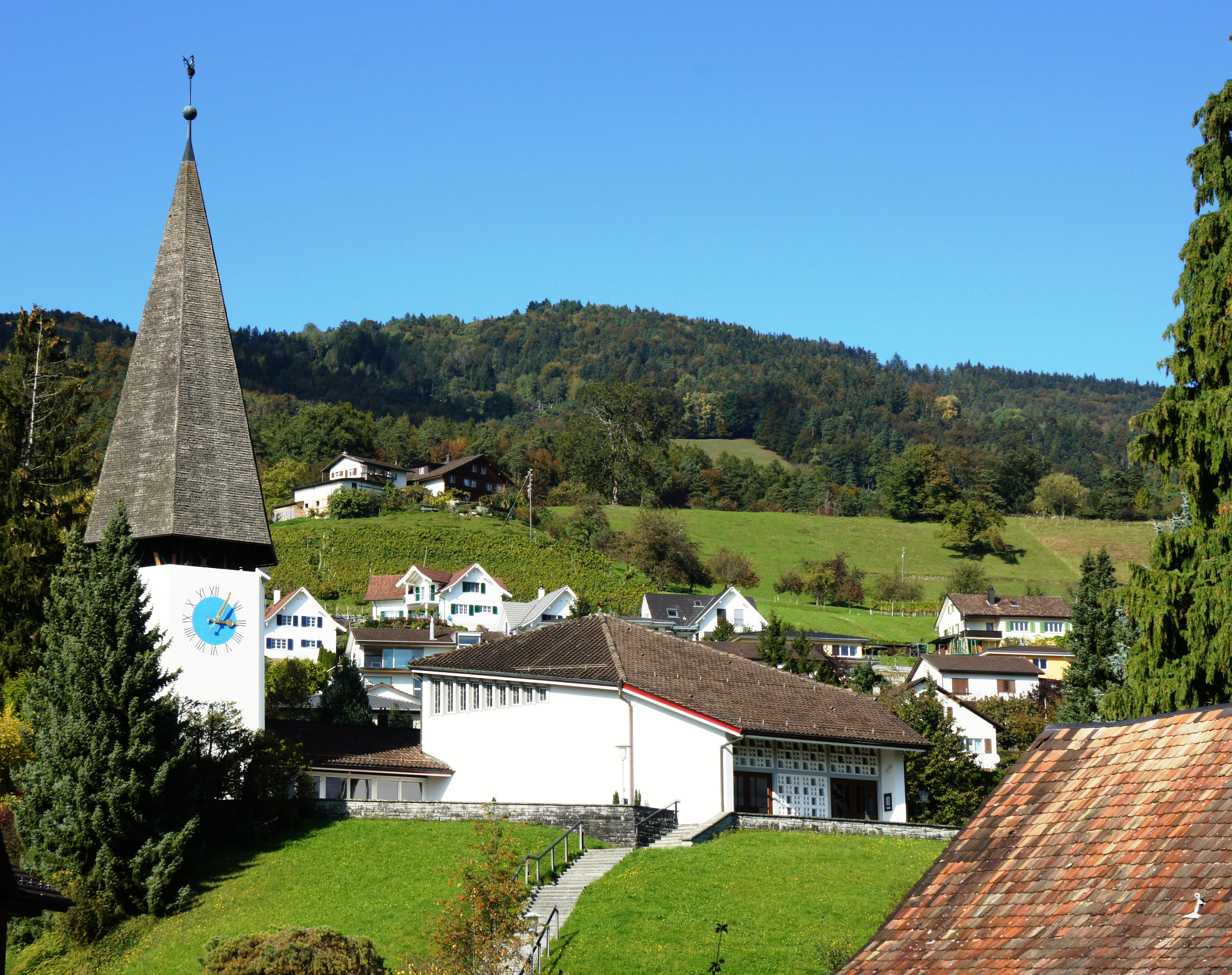

- Coat of arms
- Location of Marbach
- Location within Switzerland Location within Canton of St. Gallen
- Coordinates: 47°24′N 9°34′E
- Country: Switzerland
- Canton: St. Gallen
- District: Rheintal

Government
  - Mayor: Alexander Breu

Area
  - Total: 4.42 km^{2} (1.71 sq mi)
- Elevation: 427 m (1,401 ft)

Population (December 2020)
  - Total: 2,139
  - Density: 484/km^{2} (1,250/sq mi)
- Time zone: UTC+01:00 (CET)
  - Summer (DST): UTC+02:00 (CEST)
- Postal code: 9437
- SFOS number: 3253
- ISO 3166 code: CH-SG
- Surrounded by: Altstätten, Oberegg (AI), Oberriet, Rebstein, Reute (AR)
- Website: www.marbach.ch

Marbach (Swiss Standard German pronunciation: [ˈmarbax]) is a municipality in the Wahlkreis (constituency) of Rheintal in the canton of St. Gallen in Switzerland.

== History ==
Marbach is first mentioned in 831 as Marahbach.

== Geography ==
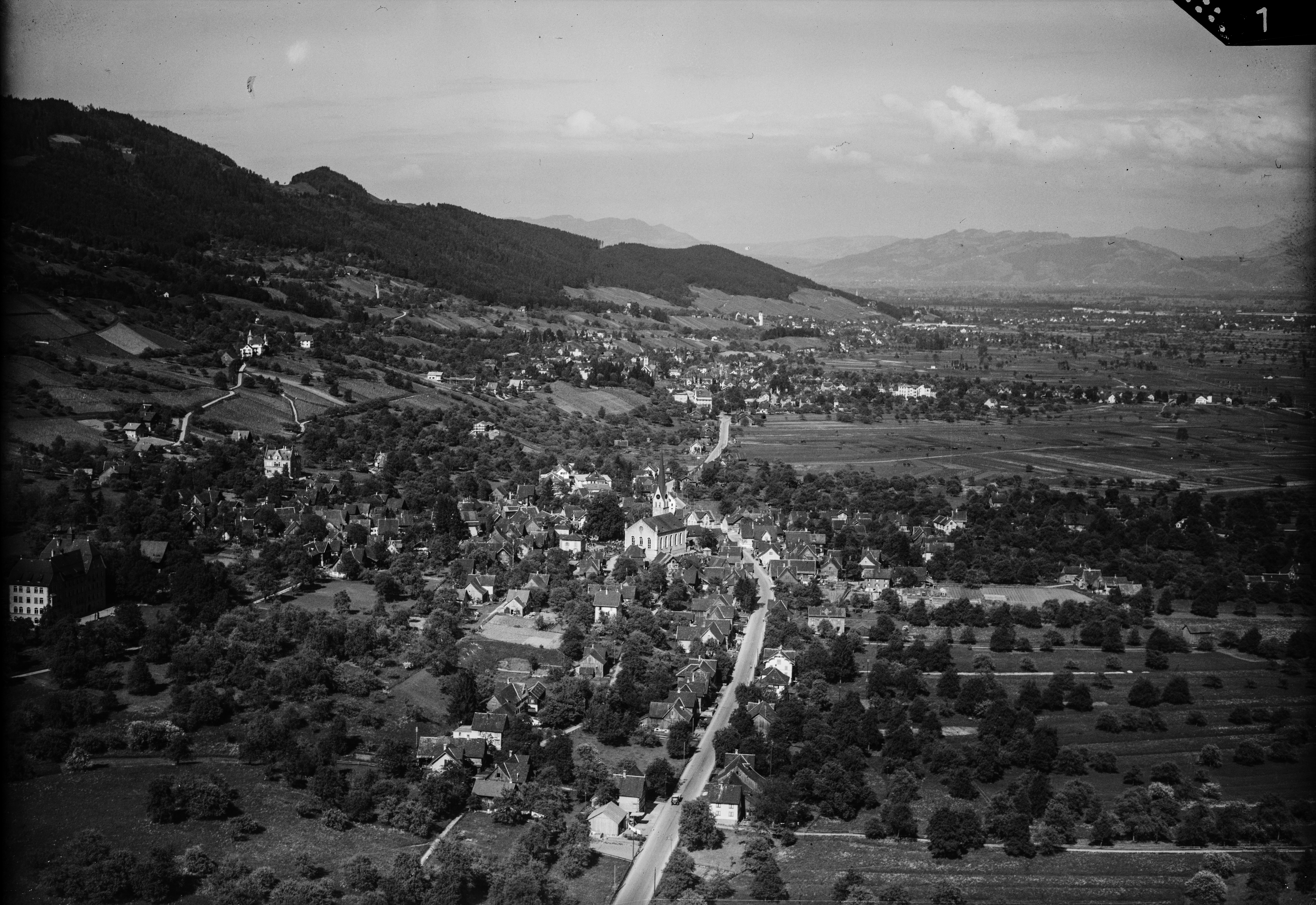
Aerial view (1947)

Marbach has an area, as of 2006, of 4.4 km^{2} (1.7 sq mi). Of this area, 75.9% is used for agricultural purposes, while 6.3% is forested. Of the rest of the land, 16.7% is settled (buildings or roads) and the remainder (1.1%) is non-productive (rivers or lakes).

The municipality is located in the Rheintal Wahlkreis. The village is located between Rebstein and Altstätten.

== Coat of arms ==
The blazon of the municipal coat of arms is Azure, a Bend wavy Argent and in chief sinister a letter M Or.

== Demographics ==
Marbach has a population (as of 31 December 2020) of 2,139. As of 2007, about 14.9% of the population was made up of foreign nationals. Of the foreign population, (as of 2000), 36 are from Germany, 34 are from Italy, 129 are from ex-Yugoslavia, 27 are from Austria, 19 are from Turkey, and 45 are from another country. Over the last 10 years the population has grown at a rate of 11.8%. Most of the population (as of 2000) speaks German (91.8%), with Albanian being second most common ( 3.4%) and Italian being third ( 1.0%). Of the Swiss national languages (as of 2000), 1,633 speak German, 6 people speak French, 17 people speak Italian, and 4 people speak Romansh.

The age distribution, as of 2000, in Marbach is; 283 children or 15.9% of the population are between 0 and 9 years old and 301 teenagers or 16.9% are between 10 and 19. Of the adult population, 188 people or 10.6% of the population are between 20 and 29 years old. 297 people or 16.7% are between 30 and 39, 249 people or 14.0% are between 40 and 49, and 192 people or 10.8% are between 50 and 59. The senior population distribution is 130 people or 7.3% of the population are between 60 and 69 years old, 98 people or 5.5% are between 70 and 79, there are 39 people or 2.2% who are between 80 and 89, and there are 2 people or 0.1% who are between 90 and 99.

In 2000 there were 157 persons (or 8.8% of the population) who were living alone in a private dwelling. There were 298 (or 16.8%) persons who were part of a couple (married or otherwise committed) without children, and 1,167 (or 65.6%) who were part of a couple with children. There were 76 (or 4.3%) people who lived in single parent home, while there are 7 persons who were adult children living with one or both parents, 11 persons who lived in a household made up of relatives, 6 who lived household made up of unrelated persons, and 57 who are either institutionalized or live in another type of collective housing.

In the 2007 federal election the most popular party was the SVP which received 39.4% of the vote. The next three most popular parties were the CVP (24.8%), the FDP (11.2%) and the SP (11.1%).

The entire Swiss population is generally well educated. In Marbach about 71.9% of the population (between age 25–64) have completed either non-mandatory upper secondary education or additional higher education (either university or a Fachhochschule). Out of the total population in Marbach, as of 2000, the highest education level completed by 377 people (21.2% of the population) was Primary, while 603 (33.9%) have completed their secondary education, 179 (10.1%) have attended a Tertiary school, and 79 (4.4%) are not in school. The remainder did not answer this question.

The historical population is given in the following table:

year	population
1830	1,074
1850	1,088
1900	1,111
1950	1,216
1980	1,382
2000	1,779

== Economy ==
As of 2007, Marbach had an unemployment rate of 1.73%. As of 2005, there were 73 people employed in the primary economic sector and about 23 businesses involved in this sector. 165 people are employed in the secondary sector and there are 18 businesses in this sector. 319 people are employed in the tertiary sector, with 67 businesses in this sector.

As of October 2009 the average unemployment rate was 2.2%. There were 109 businesses in the municipality of which 22 were involved in the secondary sector of the economy while 66 were involved in the third.

As of 2000 there were 310 residents who worked in the municipality, while 577 residents worked outside Marbach and 342 people commuted into the municipality for work.

== Religion ==
From the 2000 census, 833 or 46.8% are Roman Catholic, while 549 or 30.9% belonged to the Swiss Reformed Church. Of the rest of the population, there are 2 individuals (or about 0.11% of the population) who belong to the Christian Catholic faith, there are 18 individuals (or about 1.01% of the population) who belong to the Orthodox Church, and there are 80 individuals (or about 4.50% of the population) who belong to another Christian church. There is 1 individual who is Jewish, and 105 (or about 5.90% of the population) who are Islamic. There are 25 individuals (or about 1.41% of the population) who belong to another church (not listed on the census), 100 (or about 5.62% of the population) belong to no church, are agnostic or atheist, and 66 individuals (or about 3.71% of the population) did not answer the question.

== Sights ==
The village of Marbach as well as a concentration of castles, which is known as the Schlosslandschaft Ober/Unterrheintal and spans Altstätten, Balgach, Berneck and Marbach is designated as part of the Inventory of Swiss Heritage Sites.

== Notable people ==
- Jennifer Hohl (born 1986 in Marbach, St. Gallen) a retired Swiss professional road cyclist, represented Switzerland at the 2008 Summer Olympics
