= Magdalena Locher =

Swiss businesswoman and brewery owner (1864–1944)

- Born: Maria Magdalena Moser; January 22, 1864; Rorschach, St. Gallen, Switzerland
- Died: September 17, 1944 (aged 80); Oberegg, Appenzell Innerrhoden, Switzerland
- Occupations: Businesswoman, brewery owner, innkeeper
- Known for: Pioneering electrification in Appenzell Innerrhoden
- Spouse: Johann Josef Locher (m. 1889; died 1898)
- Children: 5 (including Johann Emil Locher and Armin Locher)

Magdalena Locher (née Moser; 22 January 1864 – 17 September 1944) was a Swiss businesswoman, brewery owner, and innkeeper who took over the Krone brewery and inn in Oberegg after her husband's death in 1898. She oversaw the expansion and modernization of the business, which became the largest industrial enterprise in the rural Catholic community, and was involved in bringing the first electricity to the region.

== Early life ==
Maria Magdalena Moser was born on 22 January 1864 in Rorschach, the second of five children of Karl Anton Moser, a farmer and bailiff, and Maria Magdalena Züllig, who worked as a housekeeper and innkeeper. She grew up in Rorschach, where she attended primary school.

In 1886, Moser moved to Oberegg in Appenzell Innerrhoden, where she worked as a housekeeper and innkeeper at the Krone brewery and inn. Three years later, in 1889, she married Johann Josef Locher, a brewer from Oberegg and son of the establishment's owners. The couple had five children together, though one died shortly after birth.

== Business leadership ==
Johann Josef Locher took over the family business in 1890. His father, Johann Christoph Locher, had acquired the bankrupt Fässler brewery of Appenzell at auction four years earlier, operating it separately from the Oberegg establishment. This business would later become known as Brauerei Locher AG, which continued to operate into the 21st century.

When Johann Josef Locher died in 1898 following a carriage accident, the Krone brewery and inn was converted into a partnership, with his widow and four minor children as partners. Magdalena Locher became the owner and director of what was then Oberegg's largest industrial enterprise. She managed the brewery with the intention of keeping it within the family and eventually transferring it to her sons when they came of age, while focusing her day-to-day efforts primarily on running the inn.

=== Modernization and technical innovations ===
Under Magdalena Locher's management, the Krone brewery underwent significant expansion and modernization. In 1901, a machine room was constructed equipped with a boiler, steam engine, and cooling system. Through the installation of a crankshaft and connecting line, the main building and stable were also supplied with electricity and lighting, marking the first electrification in Oberegg. The brewing hall was built in 1906, designed in the characteristic crenellated architectural style typical of breweries of that era, matching the machine room. A new company headquarters was constructed on Rutlenstrasse in 1901. Locher's involvement in technological development extended beyond her own business when she became the main promoter of the local electricity company (Elektra Oberegg-Schachen-Hirschberg) in 1912, making her an early advocate of technical progress in Appenzell Innerrhoden.

Despite her business responsibilities, Locher maintained a commitment to Christian charity, supporting needy individuals, the sick, and students in the village and among her acquaintances through visits and donations.

== Later years and legacy ==
In 1918, Magdalena Locher transferred the brewery and in to her son, Johann Emil Locher. Her other son, Armin Locher, who would later become a Landammann and member of the Swiss Council of States, joined the management in 1927. After Johann Emil's death, Armin continued to run the family business alone.

Magdalena Locher had previously experienced the deaths of her daughters Luisa Emilia and Maria Lina Paula Locher. As a businesswoman operating in the conservative, rural context of Appenzell Innerrhoden, she died on 17 September 1944 at the age of 80, having lived a life marked by both business success and personal challenges.

== Bibliography ==
- Breitenmoser, Marius (1974). Die Handels- und Industriefirmen in Appenzell Innerrhoden. pp. 27–28.
- Bischofberger, Hermann (1986). 100 Jahre Brauerei K. Locher AG Appenzell. Ewig Locher Bier….
- Aragai, David; Fuchs, Thomas (2018). Oberegger Geschichte. Der äussere Landesteil von Appenzell Innerrhoden. pp. 166–167.
- Büsser, Benedikt (2021). Magdalena Locher-Moser: Wirtschaftspionierin in einer Männerwelt an der Wende zum zwanzigsten Jahrhundert (Typescript, Bezirksarchiv Oberegg). Kantonsschule am Burggraben, St. Gallen.
- "Nécrologie". Oberegger Anzeiger. 21 September 1944.
