= Bad Waldsee =

- Town
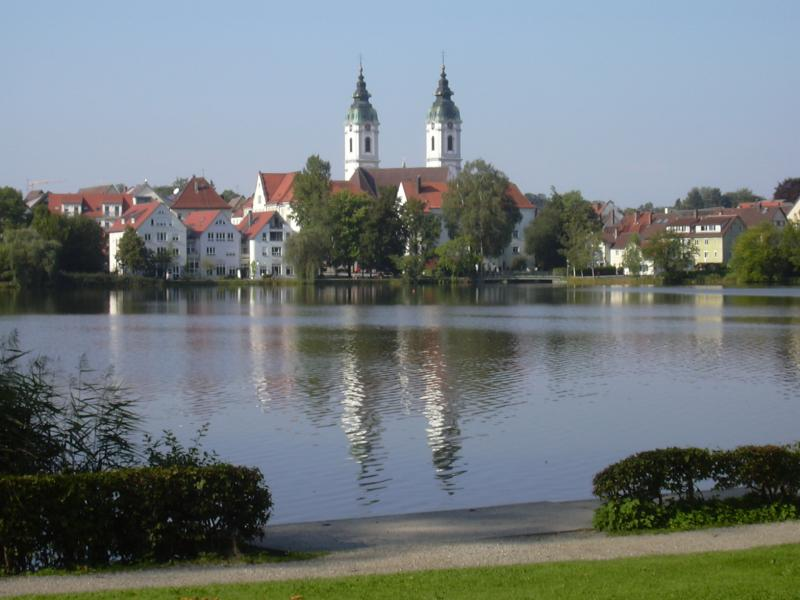
- Bad Waldsee

- Coat of arms

- Location of Bad Waldsee within Ravensburg district
- Interactive map of Bad Waldsee
- Location within Germany Location within Baden-Württemberg
- Coordinates: 47°55′16″N 09°45′07″E
- Country: Germany
- State: Baden-Württemberg
- Admin. region: Tübingen
- District: Ravensburg
- Subdivisions: 6 Stadtteile

Government
  - Mayor (2020–28): Matthias Henne

Area
  - Total: 108.55 km^{2} (41.91 sq mi)
- Elevation: 588 m (1,929 ft)

Population (2025-12-31)
  - Total: 20,910
  - Density: 192.6/km^{2} (498.9/sq mi)
- Time zone: UTC+01:00 (CET)
  - Summer (DST): UTC+02:00 (CEST)
- Postal codes: 88339
- Dialling codes: 07524
- Vehicle registration: RV
- Website: www.bad-waldsee.de

Bad Waldsee (German pronunciation: [baːt ˈvaltˌzeː]) is a town in Upper Swabia in Baden-Württemberg, Germany. It is part of the district of Ravensburg. It is situated 20 km south of Biberach an der Riß, and 20 km northeast of Ravensburg. The town has a historic old city with landmarks and pedestrian zone. Bad Waldsee is the district center for the Bodensee-Oberschwaben district and is the seat of the townships of Bad Waldsee, Aulendorf and Bergatreute.

== Geography ==
Bad Waldsee is located in Upper Swabia north of the Altdofer forest. The old city is situated on an isthmus between two lakes—the Stadtsee on the east connects to Urbach through a channel in the south, and the smaller Schlosssee on the west, which empties into the Stadtsee from the direction of Pfaffenbach.

== Constituent communities ==
- Reute is part of the district of Bad Waldsee since 1971.
- Gaisbeuren (1785 inhabitants).
- Haisterkirch (1433 inhabitants).
- Michelwinnaden (618 inhabitants).
- Mittelurbach (1347 inhabitants).

== History ==
Waldsee was first documented in 926 in the Weissenburger Codex, which mentions the destruction caused by the Hungarians during their invasion of southern Germany. It says "In Walahsé a royal estate was destroyed by the heathens. All it has left is two lots of farmland, 60 carts of hay, a mill and a church." The town was granted city-rights in 1298. Authority over the city was exercised by the "Lords of Waldsee", a title the city soon sold to the Habsburg Duke of Austria. However, in 1386 the House of Habsburg pledged the city of Waldsee to the steward Johann von Waldburg.

In 1406 the pledge lordship (Pfandherrschaft) of Waldburg was renewed, when the city of Waldsee, together with the towns of Mengen, Riedlingen, Munderkingen and Saulgau, were finally sold off by the House of Habsburg. From this time these cities have been known together as the "fünf Donaustädte" (Five Danube Towns). The House of Waldburg stayed in control of the towns until Napoleon established a new European order through war and politics, which made Waldsee part of the Kingdom of Württemberg in 1806. In 1807 Waldsee was elevated the status of township, and the city grew in prominence during this period.

=== Inflation ===
In 1918 the nickel and copper coins became scarce because of the First World War. That is why many communities were forced to mint their own coins. The council of Waldsee consulted on March 13, 1918 the minting of their own coins. It was decided to issue coins in sizes of 50 Pfennig, 10 Pfennig and 5 Pfennig. They could be exchanged until May 1, 1922.

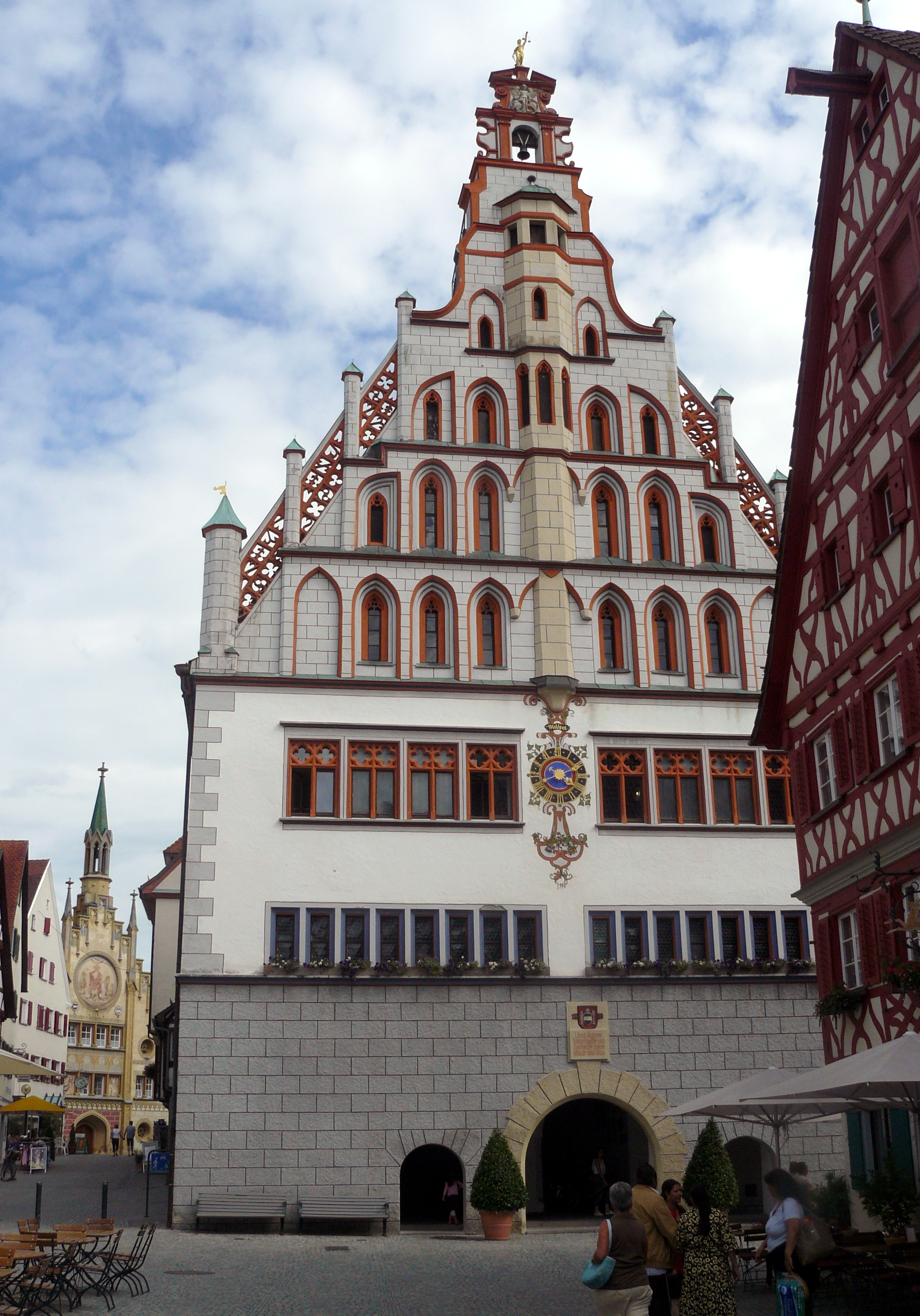
Town hall Bad Waldsee

In 1923, when inflation reached its peak, the city printed its own money in bills. On August 26, 1923, the local council decided to issue certificates worth 500,000, 1 million Mark and 2 million marks. Later it was decided to print more certificates with the values five million to ten trillion. The back of the bills of five million to twenty billion showed the "Iron Man", the Steward of Waldburg.

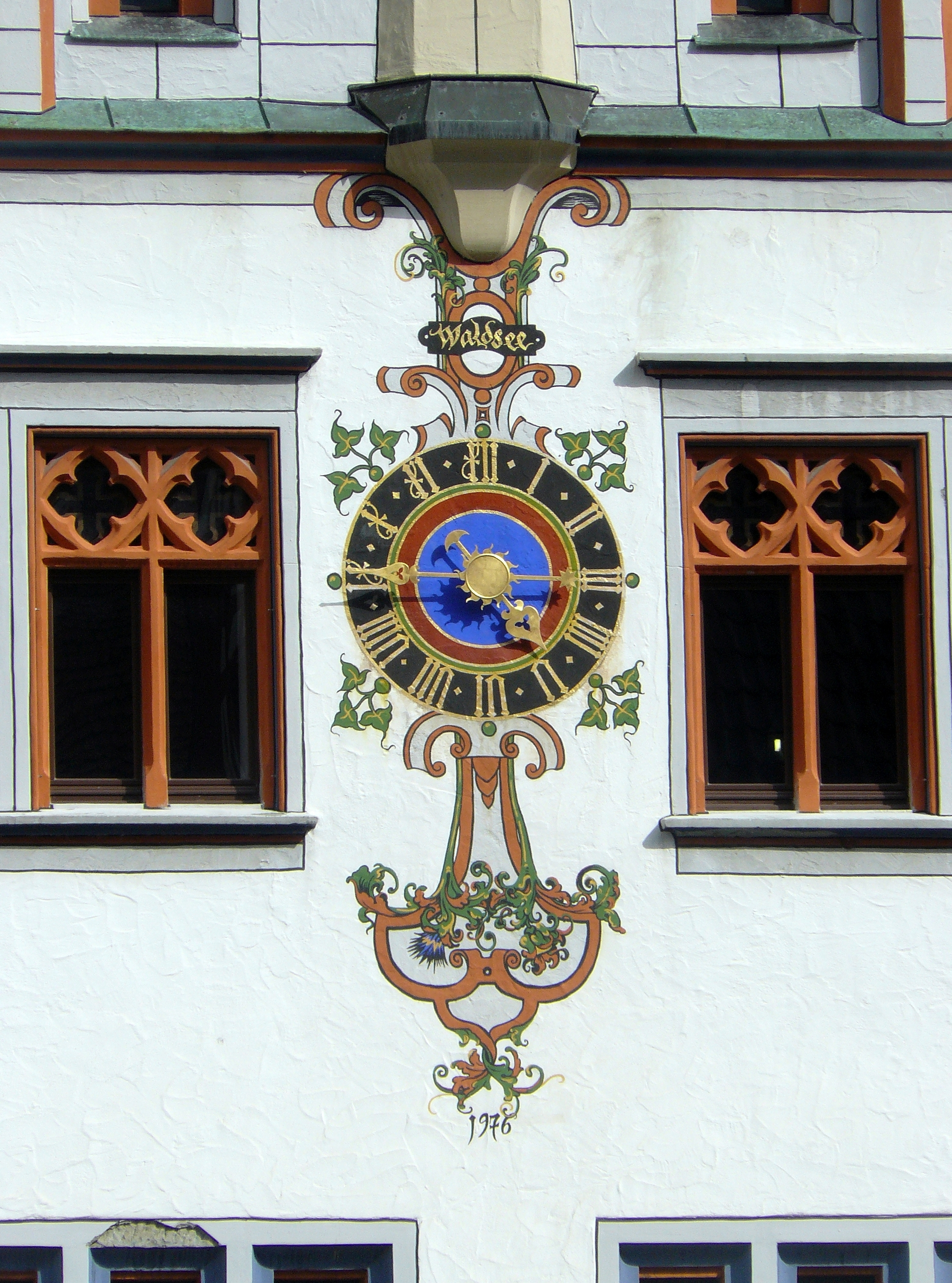
Town hall clock

Waldsee held the status of township until 1938, when the Nazi Government dissolved the townships and Waldsee became part of the new Biberach and Ravensburg County. In 1942 Erich Bachem founded Bachem-Werke GmbH in the town. The company built and tested the Bachem Ba 349 rocket plane in Waldsee.

During the economic restructuring after the War, the city opened its first mud bath spa in 1950. With the construction of more spas, the city obtained the designation "Moorheilbad", awarded to spa towns with mud thought to have curative properties. In 1974 the city was designated as "Kneippkurort", awarded to certain towns with water thought to have curative properties.

== Flag and arms ==
The city colors of Bad Waldsee are black and silver (sometimes shown in white). The fish to the left of the arms stands for the fishing from the city's lakes. The star over the arms symbolizes the city's devotion to the Virgin Mary, who is venerated at the mountain chapel "Our Dear Lady of the Mountain." An oar, sometimes interpreted as a grain shovel, on the right of the crest highlights the fishing and/or farming in the area. The seal itself comes from the first possessor of the city, the Lords of Waldsee.

== Sister cities ==
- Bad Elster, Germany
- Bâgé-le-Châtel, France

== Economy and Infrastructure ==
=== Transport ===
The city is connected by intercity bus to Bad Wurzach, Leutkirch and Ravensburg by the Bodensee-Oberschwaben Verkehrsverbund. Bad Waldsee is on the B-30 highway. Bad Waldsee has its own airport for small craft, though the nearest major airport is Friedrichshafen Airport.

=== Local Businesses ===
Firms in Bad Waldsee include Hymer and the Walz Mail-Order Company. Hymer is a manufacturer of campers and mobile homes and employs over 1,000 people in the city. The Walz Firm specializes in mail-order baby articles. The third largest industry in the city are the local spas such as Maximilianbad, Elisabethenbad, Mayenbad and also the Waldsee-Therme.

=== Leisure and sports facilities ===
The Waldsee-Therme is a 1994 opened thermal and therapy center. It is fed from Swabias hottest source. The water comes with nearly 65 °C from the depth. There is also the adventure climbing park-pine wood with nine courses and the "Stadtsee active way" with fitness equipment and a dance chimes.

== Culture ==
- A former rail station, Durlesbach, is mentioned in the Volkslied Auf de schwäbsche Eisebahne.

== Notable people ==
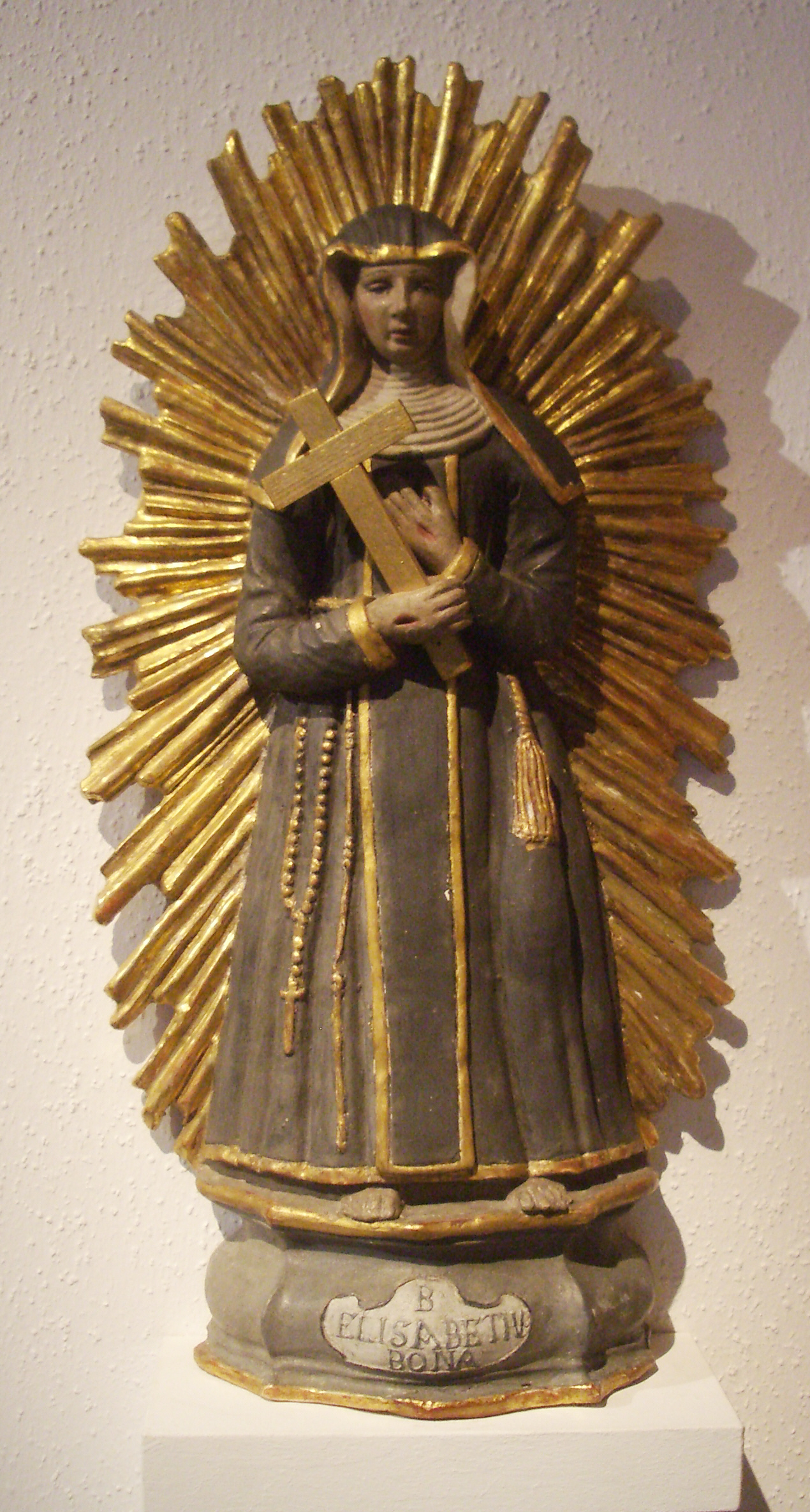
Elizabeth of Reute at Waldsee Kornhausmuseu

- Konrad Kügelin (1366–1428), a Roman Catholic monk, local provost, and hagiographer of Elizabeth of Reute.
- Elizabeth of Reute (1386–1420), known as Good Beth, mystic, winner of Stigmata, beatified in 1755
- Georg, Truchsess von Waldburg (1488–1531), Swabian League Commander in the German Peasants' War.
- Louis Lang (1812–1893), German-American painter, used brilliant but well-balanced colouring
- Constantin Dausch (1841–1908), sculptor
- Josef Bühler (1904–1948), NSDAP jurist, participant at the Wannsee Conference, executed for war crimes
- Erich Bachem (1906–1960), engineer and designer, worked for Hymer AG in Bad Waldsee
- Eugen Maucher (1912–1991), politician of the CDU and former member of the German Bundestag.
- Willibald Sauerländer (1924–2018), art historian and art critic
- Friedrich Wilhelm Schnitzler (1928–2011), farmer, politician (CDU), farmers' association official and manager,
- Erwin Hymer (1930–2013), entrepreneur, founder of the Hymer AG
- Georg Zundel (1931–2007), physicist, entrepreneur and philanthropist, brought up locally

== Literature ==
- Barczyk, Michael: Von vier Holzzubern zum größten Moorheilbad in Oberschwaben. Bad Waldsee. In: Wolfgang Niess, Sönke Lorenz (Hrsg.): Kult-Bäder und Bäderkultur in Baden-Württemberg. Markstein-Verlag, Filderstadt 2004, ISBN 3-935129-16-5.
- Memminger, Johann Daniel Georg von: Gemeinde Waldsee. In: Johann Daniel Georg von Memminger (Hrsg.): Beschreibung des Oberamts Waldsee. Mit einer Karte des Oberamts, einer Ansicht von Waldsee und vier Tabellen. Cotta u. a., Stuttgart u. a. 1834 (Beschreibung des Königreichs Württemberg 10), Full text at Wikisource

== Gallery ==
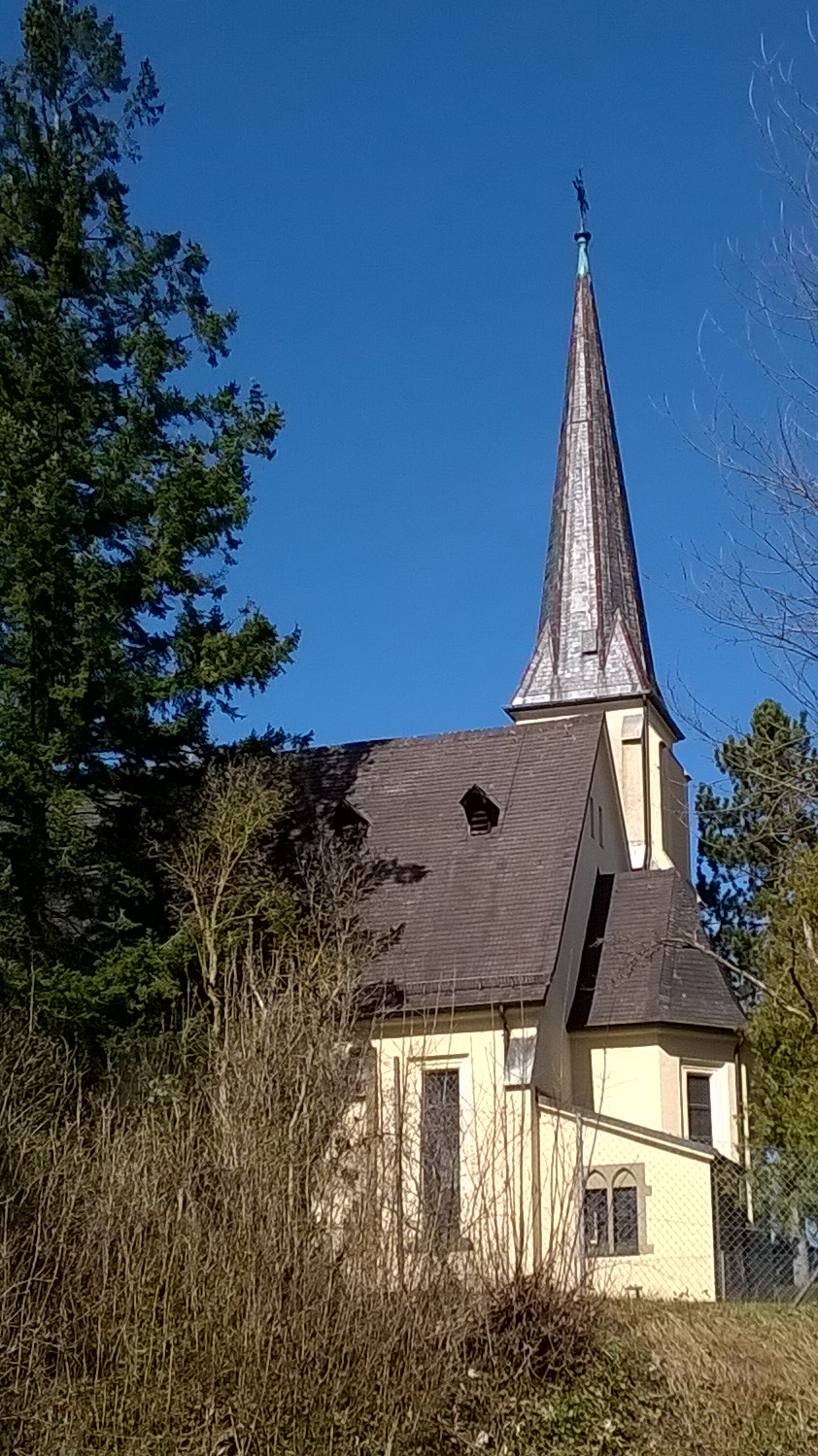
evangelical church

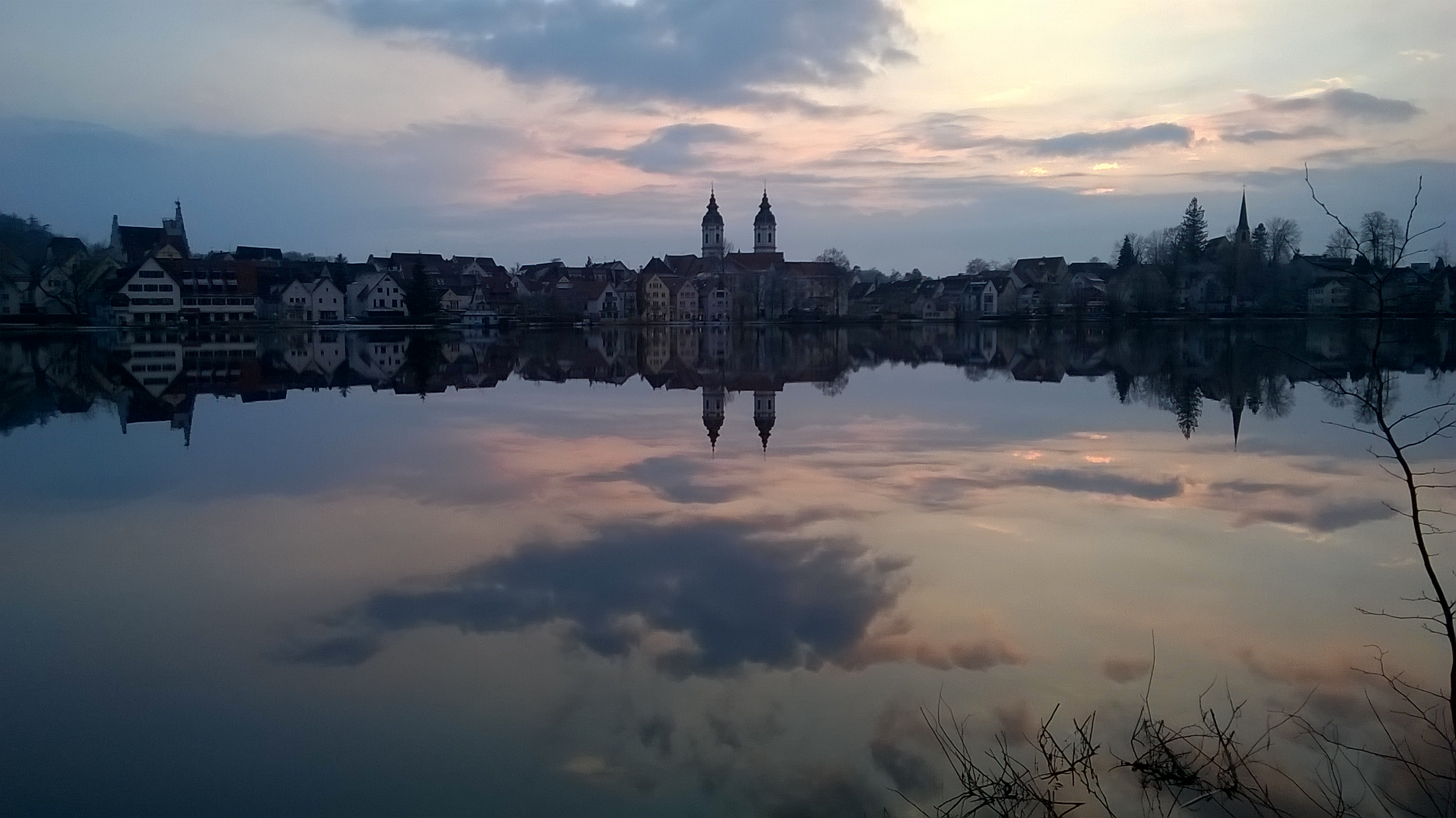
view over the lake

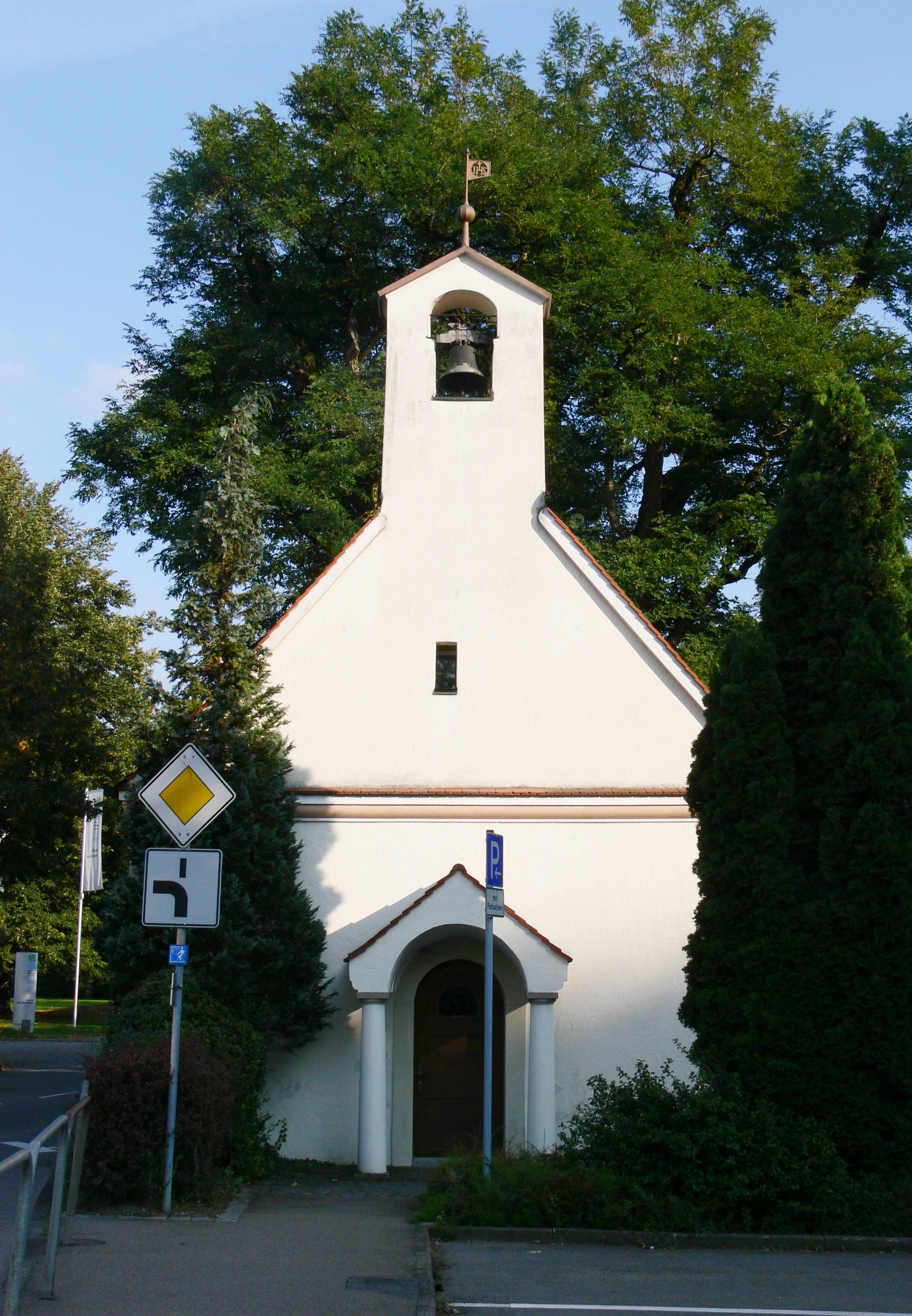
Saint Michael's church
