= Salez-Sennwald railway station =

Railway station in Switzerland

Salez-Sennwald
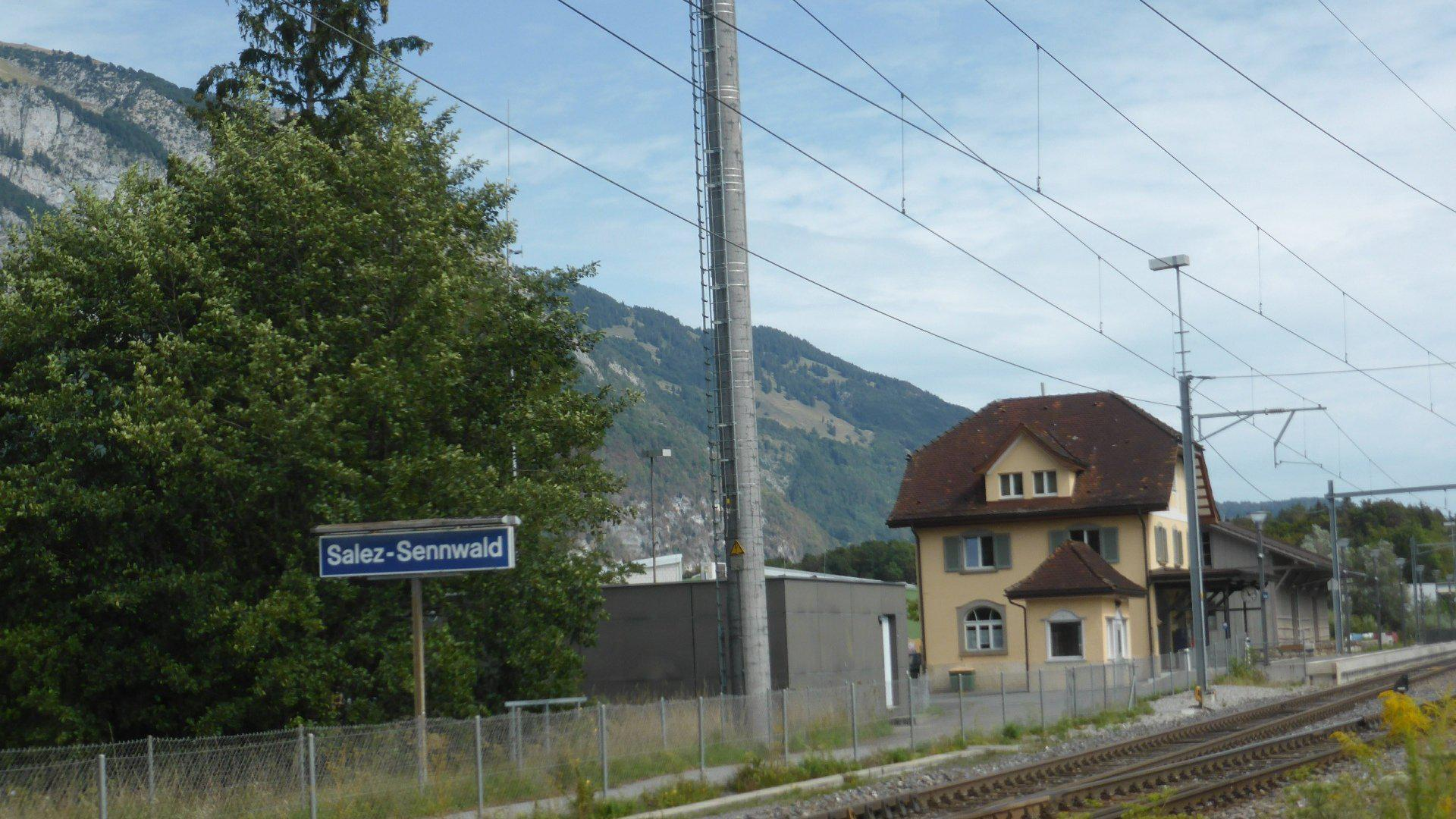
- The station building in 2018

General information
- Location: Sennwald; Switzerland
- Coordinates: 47°14′N 9°30′E
- Owner: Swiss Federal Railways
- Line: Chur–Rorschach line
- Train operators: Südostbahn

Services
| Preceding station | St. Gallen S-Bahn | Following station |
|---|---|---|
| Rüthi SG towards Rapperswil | S4 | Buchs SG towards Sargans |
Location
- Location within Switzerland Location within Canton of St. Gallen

Salez-Sennwald railway station (German: Bahnhof Salez-Sennwald) is a railway station in Sennwald, in the Swiss canton of St. Gallen. It is an intermediate stop on the Chur–Rorschach line.

== Services ==
As of the December 2023 timetable change, the following services stop at Salez-Sennwald:

- St. Gallen S-Bahn S4: hourly service between Rapperswil and Sargans via St. Gallen.
