= Rüthi =

- Municipality
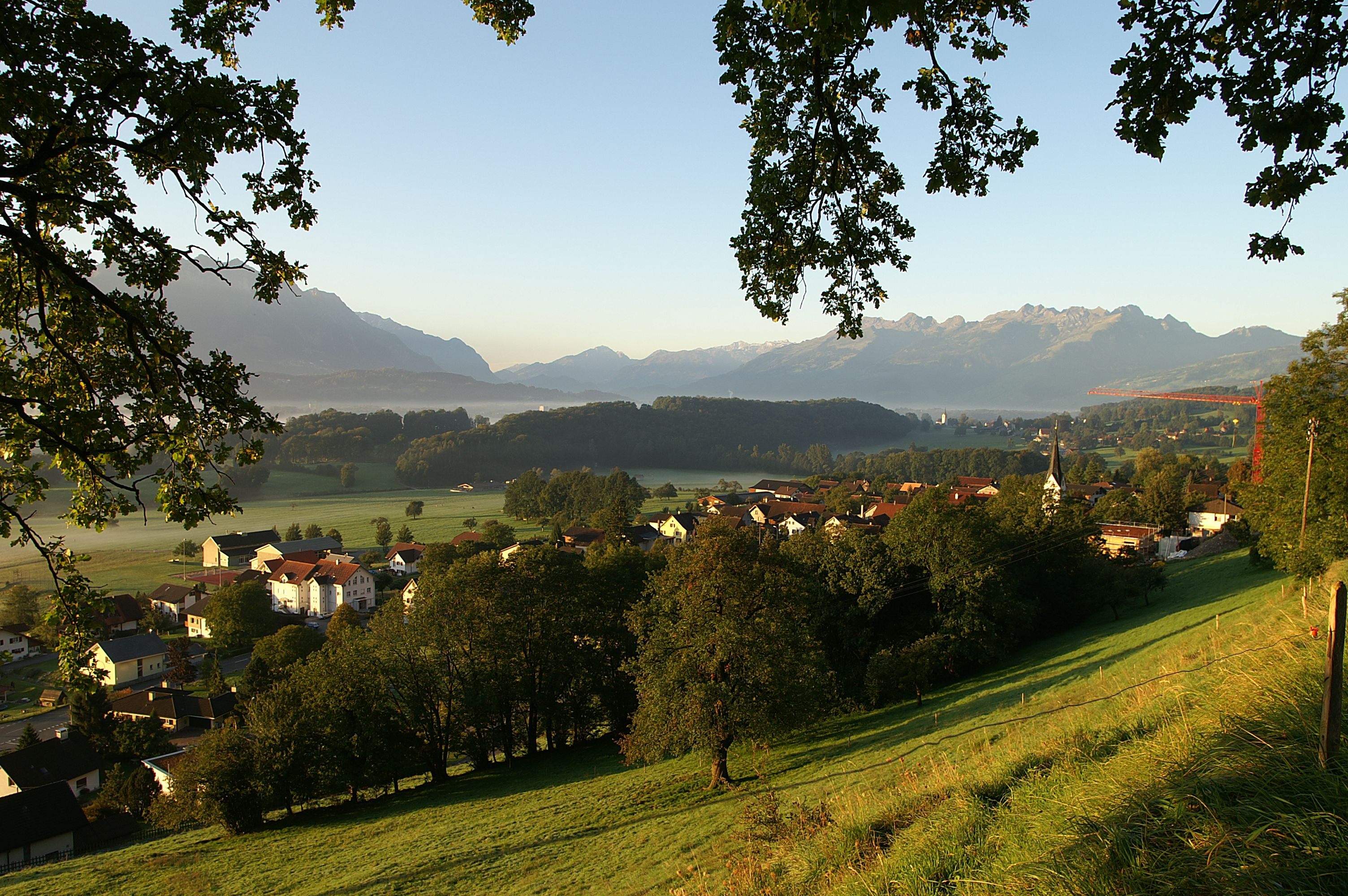

- Coat of arms
- Location of Rüthi
- Location within Switzerland Location within Canton of St. Gallen
- Coordinates: 47°18′N 9°32′E
- Country: Switzerland
- Canton: St. Gallen
- District: Rheintal

Government
  - Mayor: Thomas Ammann

Area
  - Total: 9.34 km^{2} (3.61 sq mi)
- Elevation: 430 m (1,410 ft)

Population (December 2020)
  - Total: 2,445
  - Density: 262/km^{2} (678/sq mi)
- Time zone: UTC+01:00 (CET)
  - Summer (DST): UTC+02:00 (CEST)
- Postal code: 9464
- SFOS number: 3256
- ISO 3166 code: CH-SG
- Surrounded by: Altstätten, Feldkirch (AT-8), Meiningen (AT-8), Oberriet
- Twin towns: Wolfegg (Germany)
- Website: ruethi.ch

Rüthi is a municipality in the canton of St. Gallen in Switzerland.

== History ==
Rüthi is first mentioned in 820 as Reuti. Until 1994 it was known as Rüthi (Rheintal).

== Geography ==
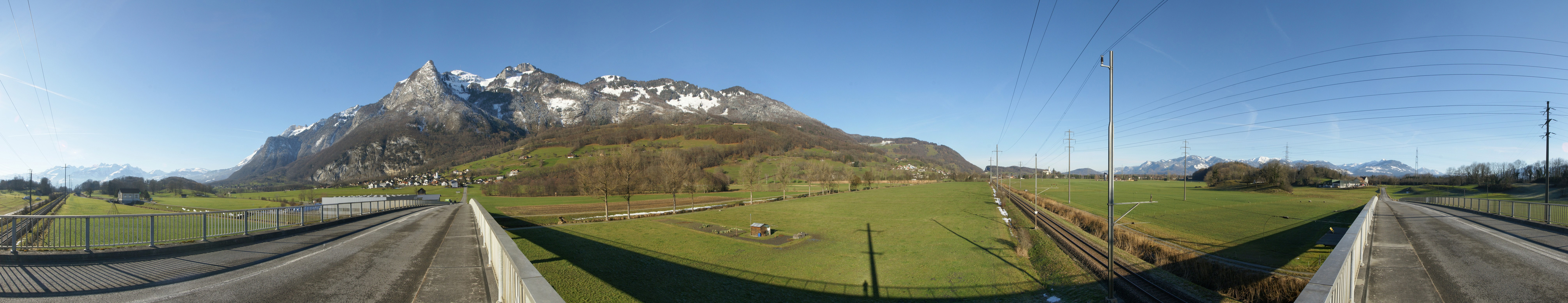
Panorama of the road between Lienz and Rüthi

Aerial view (1947)

Rüthi has an area, as of 2006, of 9.3 km^{2} (3.6 sq mi). Of this area, 47.9% is used for agricultural purposes, while 33.8% is forested. Of the rest of the land, 13.7% is settled (buildings or roads) and the remainder (4.6%) is non-productive (rivers or lakes).

The municipality was located in the Oberrheintal district until the creation of the Rheintal Wahlkreis. It consists of the villages of Rüthi, Büchel and the Hirschensprung as well as the southern part of the hamlet of Rehag. Other villages were part of the municipality. From 1798 to 1831 the village of Kobelwald (later part of Oberriet) and from 1803 to 31 the village of Lienz (afterward part of Sennwald, then in 1883 part of Altstätten) were part of Rüthi.

== Coat of arms ==
The blazon of the municipal coat of arms is Azure a Deer salient Or between two Cliffs Argent issuant from flanks and in chief as many Mullets of the same.

== Demographics ==
Rüthi has a population (as of 31 December 2020) of 2,445. As of 2007, about 18.1% of the population was made up of foreign nationals. Of the foreign population (as of 2000), 42 are from Germany, 12 are from Italy, 194 are from ex-Yugoslavia, 30 are from Austria, 6 are from Turkey, and 69 are from another country. Over the last 10 years, the population has grown at a rate of 2.2%. Most of the population (as of 2000) speaks German (90.1%), with Albanian being second most common (3.9%) and Serbo-Croatian third (1.4%). Of the Swiss national languages (as of 2000), 1,772 speak German, 12 people speak French, 11 people speak Italian, and 2 people speak Romansh.

The age distribution, as of 2000, in Rüthi is; 284 children or 14.4% of the population are between 0 and 9 years old and 283 teenagers or 14.4% are between 10 and 19. Of the adult population, 228 people or 11.6% of the population are between 20 and 29 years old. 349 people or 17.7% are between 30 and 39, 272 people or 13.8% are between 40 and 49, and 220 people or 11.2% are between 50 and 59. The senior population distribution is 149 people or 7.6% of the population are between 60 and 69 years old, 113 people or 5.7% are between 70 and 79, there are 66 people or 3.4% who are between 80 and 89, and there are 3 people or 0.2% who are between 90 and 99.

In 2000 there were 185 persons (or 9.4% of the population) who were living alone in a private dwelling. There were 371 (or 18.9%) persons who were part of a couple (married or otherwise committed) without children, and 1,185 (or 60.2%) who were part of a couple with children. There were 111 (or 5.6%) people who lived in single parent home, while there are 26 persons who were adult children living with one or both parents, 16 persons who lived in a household made up of relatives, 4 who lived household made up of unrelated persons, and 69 who are either institutionalized or live in another type of collective housing.

In the 2007 federal election the most popular party was the SVP which received 49.2% of the vote. The next three most popular parties were the CVP (26.2%), the FDP (9.5%) and the SP (8.1%).

In Rüthi about 64.8% of the population (between age 25–64) have completed either non-mandatory upper secondary education or additional higher education (either university or a Fachhochschule). Out of the total population in Rüthi, as of 2000, the highest education level completed by 459 people (23.3% of the population) was Primary, while 678 (34.5%) have completed their secondary education, 131 (6.7%) have attended a Tertiary school, and 81 (4.1%) are not in school. The remainder did not answer this question.

The historical population is given in the following table:

year	population
1837	1,438
1881	1,337
1920	1,406
1950	1,570
1990	1,677

== Economy ==
As of 2007, Rüthi had an unemployment rate of 1.71%. As of 2005, there were 64 people employed in the primary economic sector and about 28 businesses involved in this sector. 784 people were employed in the secondary sector and there were 27 businesses in this sector. 238 people were employed in the tertiary sector, with 61 businesses in this sector.

As of October 2009, the average unemployment rate was 4.8%. There were 118 businesses in the municipality, of which 32 were involved in the secondary sector of the economy, while 65 were involved in the tertiary sector.

As of 2000, there were 417 residents who worked in the municipality, while 537 residents worked outside Rüthi, and 675 people commuted into the municipality for work.

== Religion ==
From the 2000 census, 1,389 or 70.6% are Roman Catholic, while 214 or 10.9% belonged to the Swiss Reformed Church. Of the rest of the population, there are 15 individuals (or about 0.76% of the population) who belong to the Orthodox Church, and there are 15 individuals (or about 0.76% of the population) who belong to another Christian church. There are 183 (or about 9.30% of the population) who are Islamic. There are 7 individuals (or about 0.36% of the population) who belong to another church (not listed on the census), 71 (or about 3.61% of the population) belong to no church, are agnostic or atheist, and 73 individuals (or about 3.71% of the population) did not answer the question.

== Sights ==
The village of Rüthi is designated as part of the Inventory of Swiss Heritage Sites.

== Sustainable Architecture ==
In Rüthi, there are initiatives focused on sustainable building and resource efficiency. The "Generationenhaus" is a building constructed using regional, sustainable materials, designed to be dismantled with minimal environmental impact after 200 years. This project illustrates approaches to environmentally conscious construction.

== See also ==
- Rüthi SG railway station
