= Jennifer Hohl =

Swiss cyclist (born 1986)

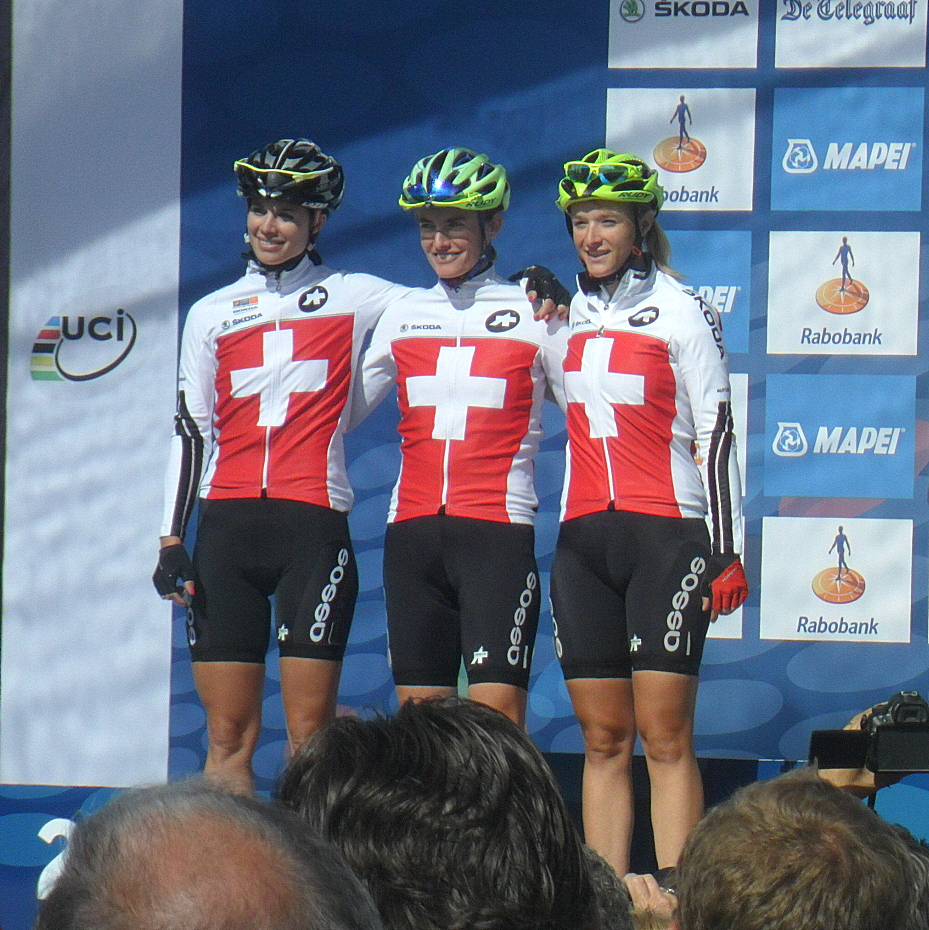
- Jennifer Hohl (left) at the 2012 UCI Road World Championships

Personal information
- Full name: Jennifer Hohl
- Born: 3 February 1986 (age 40) Marbach, St. Gallen, Switzerland
- Height: 1.68 m (5 ft 6 in)
- Weight: 55 kg (121 lb)

Cycling career
- Sport: Cycling
- Current team: Retired
- Discipline: Road
- Role: Rider

Professional teams
- 2006–2009: Bigla Cycling Team
- 2010: Noris Cycling
- 2011: Mcipollini–Giordana
- 2012: Faren–Honda Team

Major wins
- Swiss Championships (Road) (2008–2009, 2012)

Jennifer Hohl (born 3 February 1986 in Marbach, St. Gallen) is a retired Swiss professional road cyclist. She represented Switzerland at the 2008 Summer Olympics, and later earned three Swiss national championship titles in the women's elite road race (2008, 2009, and 2012). Before retiring to focus primarily on her family life and business career, Hohl rode for three seasons on the Bigla Cycling Team since 2006, followed by her short, annual stints on Germany's Noris Cycling and Italy's Mcipollini–Giordana and Faren–Honda Team.

Hohl qualified for the Swiss squad in the women's road race at the 2008 Summer Olympics by receiving one of the nation's three available berths from the UCI World Cup. Passing through the 102.6-km mark, Hohl fell into the ground after crashing her bike in a heavy collision against a small group of riders, and subsequently, abandoned her race before reaching the 3:03-barrier.

== Career highlights ==
2007
1st Overall, Tour de Berne, Bern (SUI)
8th UCI European Road Championships (U23), Sofia (BUL)
2008
1st Swiss Championships (Road), Gansingen (SUI)
2009
1st Swiss Championships (Road), Nyon (SUI)
1st Meisterschaft von Zürich, Zürich (SUI)
1st Stage 1, Giro della Toscana Int. Femminile, Viareggio (ITA)
2010
1st Overall, Grand Prix Oberbaselbiet, Switzerland
4th Swiss Championships (Road), Switzerland
2011
3rd Swiss Championships (Road), Kirchdorf (SUI)
2012
1st Swiss Championships (Road), Switzerland
