= Constantin Dausch =

German sculptor

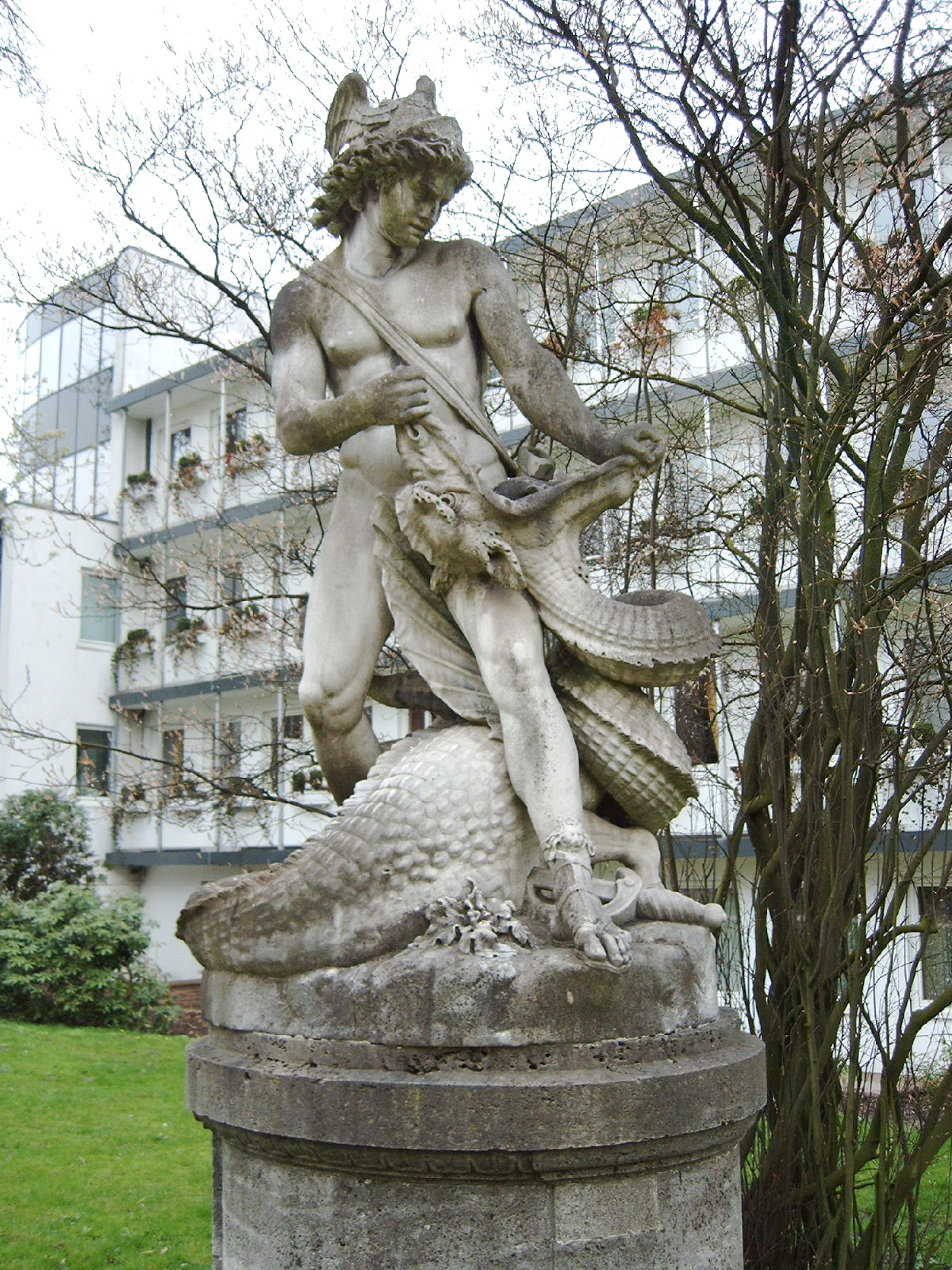
Dausch's sculpture of Siegfried at Bremen, portraying a hero of Germanic mythology in a manner similar to Classical Greek ones.

Constantin Dausch (November 30, 1841 in Waldsee, Württemberg - July 12, 1908 in Rome) was a German sculptor.

Dausch was born in Bad Waldsee, and studied in the Munich Academy, and went to Rome on a Württemberg state scholarship in 1869. He remained there until his death in 1908, from 1873 onwards working in the studio that had once belonged to Antonio Canova.
