= Eichberg, Switzerland =

Eichberg
- Municipality
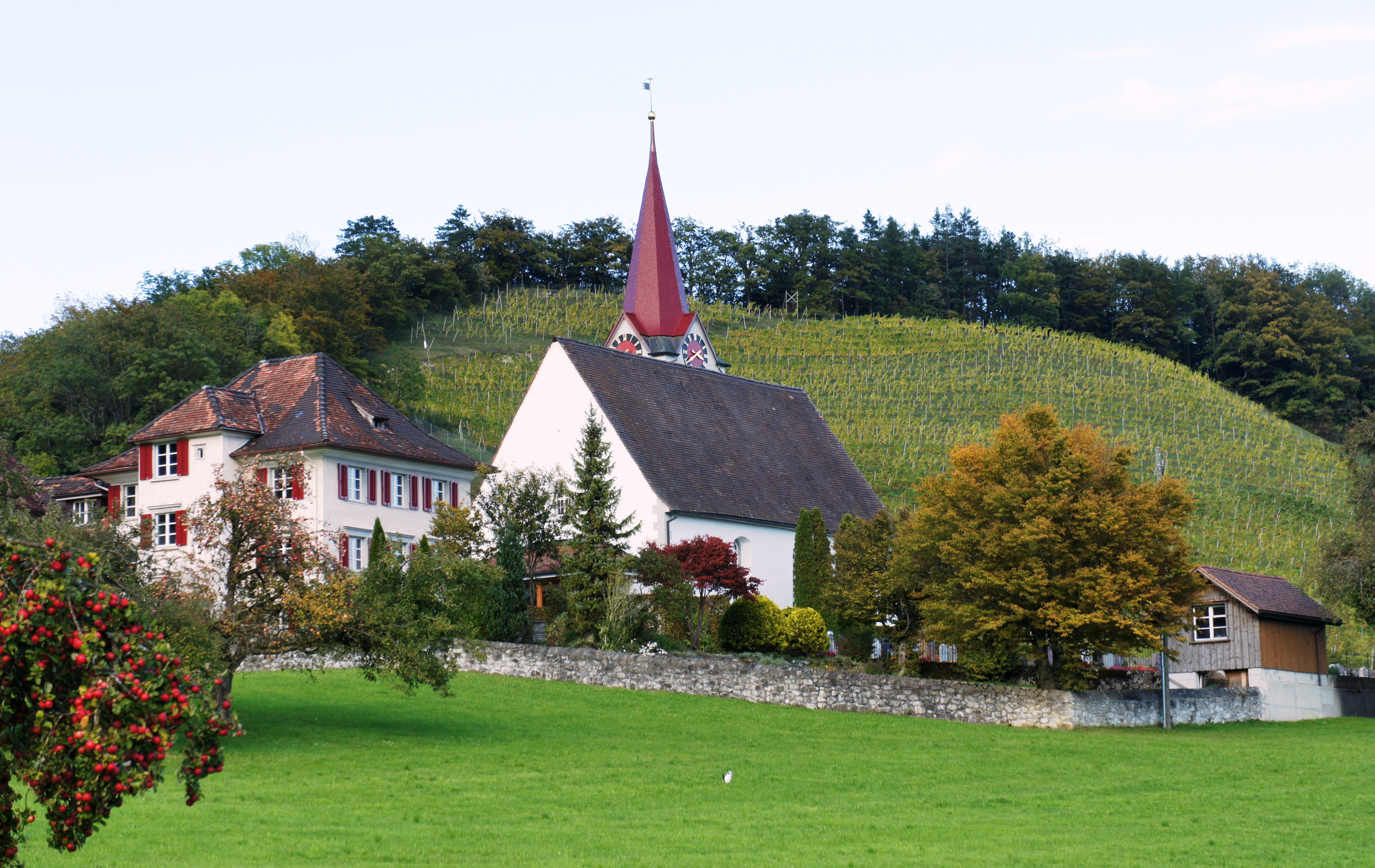

- Flag Coat of arms
- Location of Eichberg
- Location within Switzerland Location within Canton of St. Gallen
- Coordinates: 47°21′N 9°32′E
- Country: Switzerland
- Canton: St. Gallen
- District: Rheintal

Government
  - Mayor: Eliane Kaiser

Area
  - Total: 5.43 km^{2} (2.10 sq mi)
- Elevation: 500 m (1,600 ft)

Population (December 2020)
  - Total: 1,554
  - Density: 286/km^{2} (741/sq mi)
- Time zone: UTC+01:00 (CET)
  - Summer (DST): UTC+02:00 (CEST)
- Postal code: 9453
- SFOS number: 3252
- ISO 3166 code: CH-SG
- Surrounded by: Altstätten, Gais (AR), Oberriet, Rüte (AI)
- Website: eichberg.ch

Eichberg is a municipality in the Wahlkreis (constituency) of Rheintal in the canton of St. Gallen in Switzerland.

== History ==
Eichberg is first mentioned in 891 as under the Romansh name of Hermentines. In 1282 it was mentioned as Aichilberch, and in 1290 as Aitberge.

== Geography ==
Eichberg has an area, as of 2006, of 5.5 km^{2} (2.1 sq mi). Of this area, 47.7% is used for agricultural purposes, while 42.2% is forested. Of the rest of the land, 9.5% is settled (buildings or roads) and the remainder (0.5%) is non-productive (rivers or lakes).

The municipality is located in the Rheintal Wahlkreis. It is a scattered settlement on the south-east edge of the Hirschberg. It consists of the village of Eichberg-dorf and the hamlets of Au, Hölzlisberg and part of Hinterforsts (which is shared with Altstätten).

== Coat of arms ==
The blazon of the municipal coat of arms is Argent an Oak branch Vert with three leaves and two acorns. This is an example of canting, where the oak leaf is a visual pun on the German word for oak (Eichen) which forms part of the village name (lit. Oak Mountain).

== Demographics ==
Eichberg has a population (as of 31 December 2020) of 1,554. As of 2007, about 13.1% of the population was made up of foreign nationals. Of the foreign population, (as of 2000), 43 are from Germany, 10 are from Italy, 58 are from ex-Yugoslavia, 22 are from Austria, and 10 are from another country. Over the last 10 years the population has grown at a rate of 13.2%. Most of the population (as of 2000) speaks German (95.0%), with Albanian being second most common ( 2.3%) and Serbo-Croatian being third ( 0.5%). Of the Swiss national languages (as of 2000), 1,203 speak German, 2 people speak French, 5 people speak Italian, and 1 person speaks Romansh.

The age distribution, as of 2000, in Eichberg is; 217 children or 17.1% of the population are between 0 and 9 years old and 179 teenagers or 14.1% are between 10 and 19. Of the adult population, 136 people or 10.7% of the population are between 20 and 29 years old. 235 people or 18.6% are between 30 and 39, 192 people or 15.2% are between 40 and 49, and 135 people or 10.7% are between 50 and 59. The senior population distribution is 85 people or 6.7% of the population are between 60 and 69 years old, 66 people or 5.2% are between 70 and 79, there are 19 people or 1.5% who are between 80 and 89, and there are 2 people or 0.2% who are between 90 and 99.

In 2000 there were 102 persons (or 8.1% of the population) who were living alone in a private dwelling. There were 239 (or 18.9%) persons who were part of a couple (married or otherwise committed) without children, and 841 (or 66.4%) who were part of a couple with children. There were 59 (or 4.7%) people who lived in single parent home, while there are 7 persons who were adult children living with one or both parents, 4 persons who lived in a household made up of relatives, 10 who lived household made up of unrelated persons, and 4 who are either institutionalized or live in another type of collective housing.

In the 2007 federal election the most popular party was the SVP which received 53.9% of the vote. The next three most popular parties were the CVP (14.2%), the FDP (12.7%) and the SP (9.3%).

The entire Swiss population is generally well educated. In Eichberg about 68.8% of the population (between age 25–64) have completed either non-mandatory upper secondary education or additional higher education (either university or a Fachhochschule). Out of the total population in Eichberg, as of 2000, the highest education level completed by 267 people (21.1% of the population) was Primary, while 423 (33.4%) have completed Secondary, 136 (10.7%) have attended a Tertiary school, and 36 (2.8%) are not in school. The remainder did not answer this question.

The historical population is given in the following table:

year	population
1850	847
1900	873
1950	766
1980	719
2000	1,266

== Economy ==
As of 2007, Eichberg had an unemployment rate of 1.79%. As of 2005, there were 64 people employed in the primary economic sector and about 29 businesses involved in this sector. 59 people are employed in the secondary sector and there are 17 businesses in this sector. 115 people are employed in the tertiary sector, with 30 businesses in this sector.

As of October 2009 the average unemployment rate was 1.5%. There were 77 businesses in the municipality of which 17 were involved in the secondary sector of the economy while 35 were involved in the third.

As of 2000 there were 173 residents who worked in the municipality, while 473 residents worked outside Eichberg and 87 people commuted into the municipality for work.

== Religion ==
From the 2000 census, 542 or 42.8% are Roman Catholic, while 496 or 39.2% belonged to the Swiss Reformed Church. Of the rest of the population, there is 1 individual who belongs to the Orthodox Church, and there are 40 individuals (or about 3.16% of the population) who belong to another Christian church. There are 46 (or about 3.63% of the population) who are Islamic. There are 4 individuals (or about 0.32% of the population) who belong to another church (not listed on the census), 82 (or about 6.48% of the population) belong to no church, are agnostic or atheist, and 55 individuals (or about 4.34% of the population) did not answer the question.

== Politics ==
In 2012, Alex Arnold of the Pirate Party Switzerland ran for mayor of Eichberg, a part-time position. He was elected on 23 September, defeating two candidates from the Swiss People's Party. Arnold is the first member of the Swiss Pirates to win a mayoral election.
