= Oberriet =

- Municipality
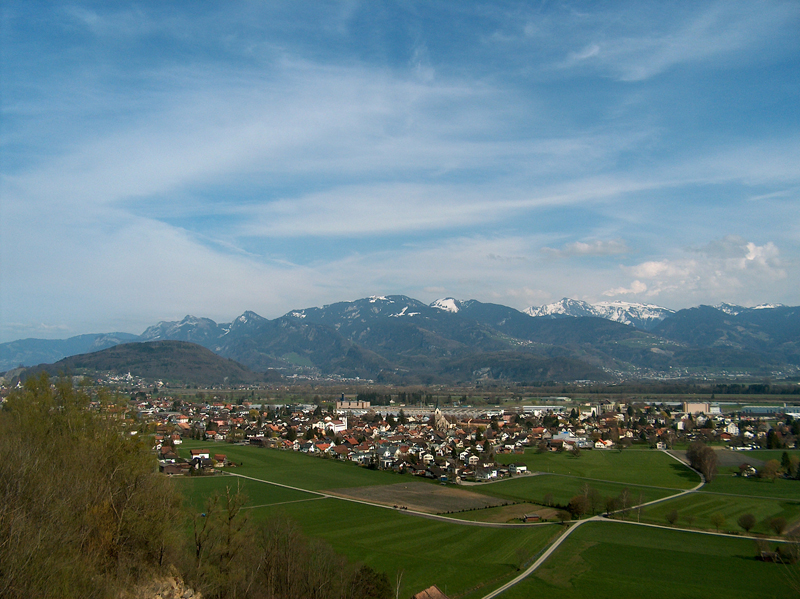

- Coat of arms
- Location of Oberriet
- Location within Switzerland Location within Canton of St. Gallen
- Coordinates: 47°19′N 9°34′E
- Country: Switzerland
- Canton: St. Gallen
- District: Rheintal

Government
  - Mayor: Walter Hess

Area
  - Total: 34.51 km^{2} (13.32 sq mi)
- Elevation: 420 m (1,380 ft)

Population (December 2020)
  - Total: 8,996
  - Density: 260.7/km^{2} (675.2/sq mi)
- Time zone: UTC+01:00 (CET)
  - Summer (DST): UTC+02:00 (CEST)
- Postal code: 9463
- SFOS number: 3254
- ISO 3166 code: CH-SG
- Surrounded by: Altach (AT-8), Altstätten, Balgach, Diepoldsau, Eichberg, Koblach (AT-8), Mäder (AT-8), Marbach, Meiningen (AT-8), Rebstein, Rüte (AI), Rüthi
- Website: oberriet.ch

Oberriet is a municipality in the Wahlkreis (constituency) of Rheintal in the canton of St. Gallen in Switzerland.

== History ==
Oberriet is first mentioned in 891 as Cobolo. About 1290 it was mentioned as Chobilwalt and in 1417 it was first mentioned as Oberriet.

== Geography ==
Aerial view from 200 m by Walter Mittelholzer (1922)

Oberriet has an area, as of 2006, of 34.5 km^{2} (13.3 sq mi). Of this area, 57.2% is used for agricultural purposes, while 25.9% is forested. Of the rest of the land, 12.9% is settled (buildings or roads) and the remainder (4.1%) is non-productive (rivers or lakes).

The municipality is located in the Rheintal Wahlkreis. It consists of the villages of Oberriet, Eichenwies, Montlingen and Kriessern in the Rhine valley, as well as Holzrhode in the Kamor hills and the village of Kobelwald and the hamlets of Freienbach, Kobelwies and Hard. It also includes the former Imperial palace (Kaiserpfalz) at Kriessern, but not the formerly attached village of Mäder in Vorarlberg and Diepoldsau. It lies between Rüthi in the south and Eichberg in the northwest.

== Coat of arms ==
The blazon of the municipal coat of arms is Per fess Or a Lion passant Sable langued and armed of the field and Sable a Cross pattee couped between in chief two Mullets Or.

== Demographics ==
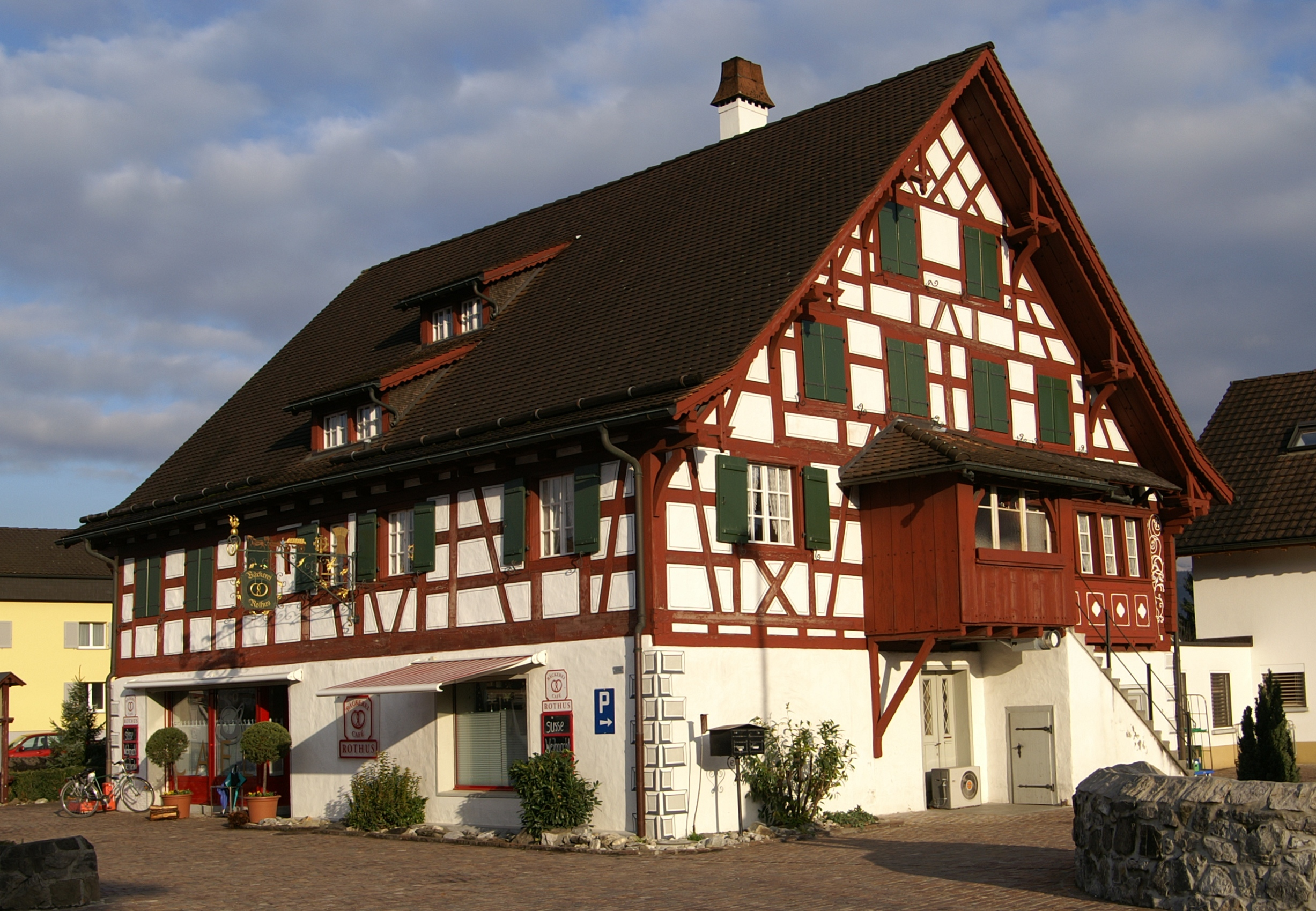
Half timbered house in the center of Eichenwies

Oberriet has a population (as of 31 December 2020) of 8,996. As of 2007, about 11.5% of the population was made up of foreign nationals. Of the foreign population, (as of 2000), 54 are from Germany, 63 are from Italy, 461 are from ex-Yugoslavia, 115 are from Austria, 3 are from Turkey, and 88 are from another country. Over the last 10 years the population has grown at a rate of 7.3%. Most of the population (as of 2000) speaks German (94.2%), with Albanian being second most common ( 3.0%) and Serbo-Croatian being third ( 0.8%). Of the Swiss national languages (as of 2000), 7,019 speak German, 8 people speak French, 41 people speak Italian, and 5 people speak Romansh.

The age distribution, as of 2000, in Oberriet is; 1,043 children or 14.0% of the population are between 0 and 9 years old and 1,017 teenagers or 13.6% are between 10 and 19. Of the adult population, 984 people or 13.2% of the population are between 20 and 29 years old. 1,308 people or 17.5% are between 30 and 39, 1,016 people or 13.6% are between 40 and 49, and 816 people or 10.9% are between 50 and 59. The senior population distribution is 617 people or 8.3% of the population are between 60 and 69 years old, 432 people or 5.8% are between 70 and 79, there are 187 people or 2.5% who are between 80 and 89, and there are 34 people or 0.5% who are between 90 and 99.

In 2000 there were 634 persons (or 8.5% of the population) who were living alone in a private dwelling. There were 1,418 (or 19.0%) persons who were part of a couple (married or otherwise committed) without children, and 4,790 (or 64.3%) who were part of a couple with children. There were 297 (or 4.0%) people who lived in single parent home, while there are 81 persons who were adult children living with one or both parents, 31 persons who lived in a household made up of relatives, 45 who lived household made up of unrelated persons, and 158 who are either institutionalized or live in another type of collective housing.

In the 2007 federal election the most popular party was the SVP which received 54.2% of the vote. The next three most popular parties were the CVP (24.5%), the FDP (7.5%) and the SP (6.2%).

In Oberriet about 66.9% of the population (between age 25–64) have completed either non-mandatory upper secondary education or additional higher education (either university or a Fachhochschule). Out of the total population in Oberriet, as of 2000, the highest education level completed by 1,778 people (23.9% of the population) was Primary, while 2,742 (36.8%) have completed their secondary education, 554 (7.4%) have attended a Tertiary school, and 329 (4.4%) are not in school. The remainder did not answer this question.

The historical population is given in the following table:

year	population
1798	2,596
1850	3,909
1900	4,277
1950	5,582
2000	7,454

== Economy ==
As of 2007, Oberriet had an unemployment rate of 1.25%. As of 2005, there were 380 people employed in the primary economic sector and about 127 businesses involved in this sector. 1,767 people are employed in the secondary sector and there are 117 businesses in this sector. 1,194 people are employed in the tertiary sector, with 200 businesses in this sector.

As of October 2009 the average unemployment rate was 2.5%. There were 443 businesses in the municipality of which 118 were involved in the secondary sector of the economy while 212 were involved in the third.

As of 2000 there were 1,895 residents who worked in the municipality, while 1,960 residents worked outside Oberriet and 1,357 people commuted into the municipality for work.

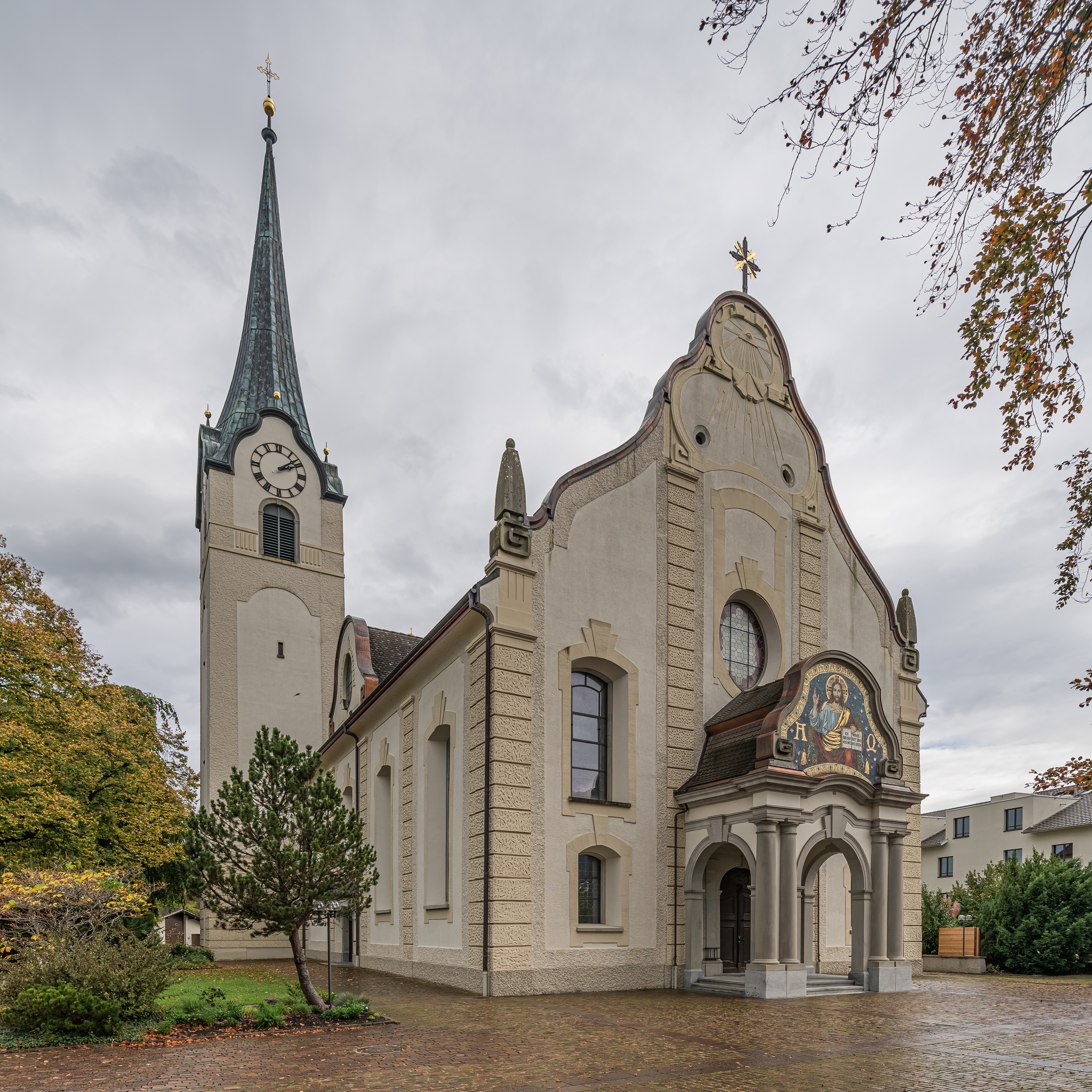
Parish church Oberriet

== Religion ==
From the 2000 census, 5,920 or 79.4% are Roman Catholic, while 632 or 8.5% belonged to the Swiss Reformed Church. Of the rest of the population, there are 3 individuals (or about 0.04% of the population) who belong to the Christian Catholic faith, there are 29 individuals (or about 0.39% of the population) who belong to the Orthodox Church, and there are 50 individuals (or about 0.67% of the population) who belong to another Christian church. There is 1 individual who is Jewish, and 398 (or about 5.34% of the population) who are Islamic. There are 16 individuals (or about 0.21% of the population) who belong to another church (not listed on the census), 181 (or about 2.43% of the population) belong to no church, are agnostic or atheist, and 224 individuals (or about 3.01% of the population) did not answer the question.

== Heritage sites of national significance ==
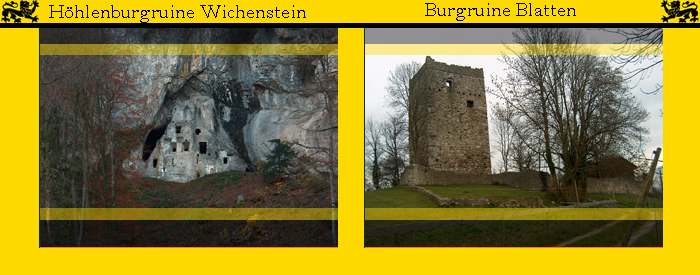
Card showing the ruins of Castles Wichenstein and Blatten

The pre-historic hill settlement on Montlingerberg and the castle ruins of Wichenstein Castle are listed as Swiss heritage sites of national significance.

== Notable persons ==
- Roland Rino Büchel (born 1965), Swiss businessman and politician

== See also ==
- Oberriet railway station
