= Rebstein =

- Municipality
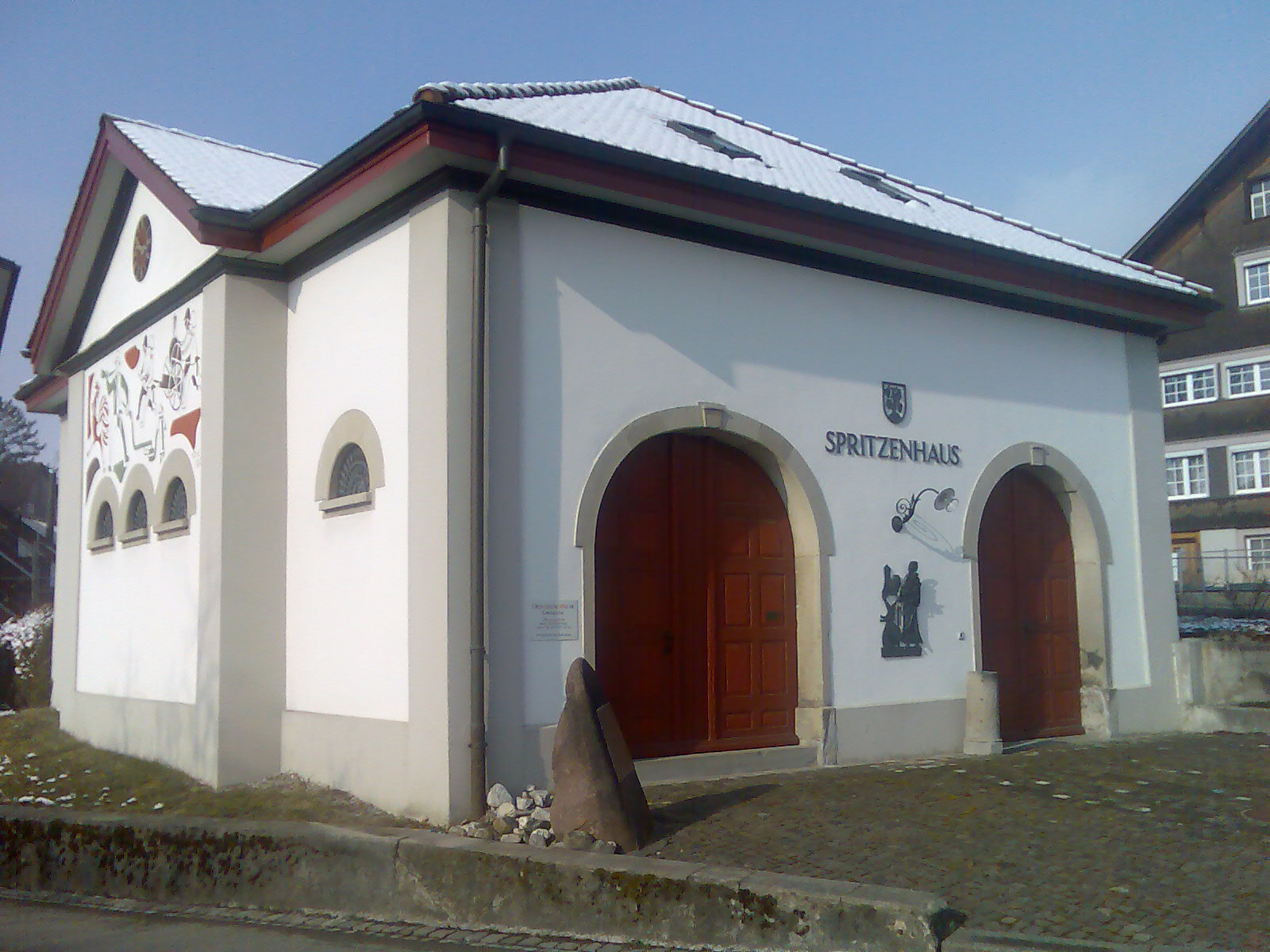

- Coat of arms
- Location of Rebstein
- Location within Switzerland Location within Canton of St. Gallen
- Coordinates: 47°24′N 9°35′E
- Country: Switzerland
- Canton: St. Gallen
- District: Rheintal

Government
  - Mayor: Andreas Eggenberger

Area
  - Total: 4.26 km^{2} (1.64 sq mi)
- Elevation: 411 m (1,348 ft)

Population (December 2020)
  - Total: 4,640
  - Density: 1,090/km^{2} (2,820/sq mi)
- Time zone: UTC+01:00 (CET)
  - Summer (DST): UTC+02:00 (CEST)
- Postal code: 9445
- SFOS number: 3255
- ISO 3166 code: CH-SG
- Surrounded by: Balgach, Marbach, Oberriet, Reute (AR)
- Website: rebstein.ch

Rebstein is a municipality in the Wahlkreis (constituency) of Rheintal in the canton of St. Gallen in Switzerland.

== History ==
Rebstein is first mentioned in 1270 as Rebistain.

== Geography ==
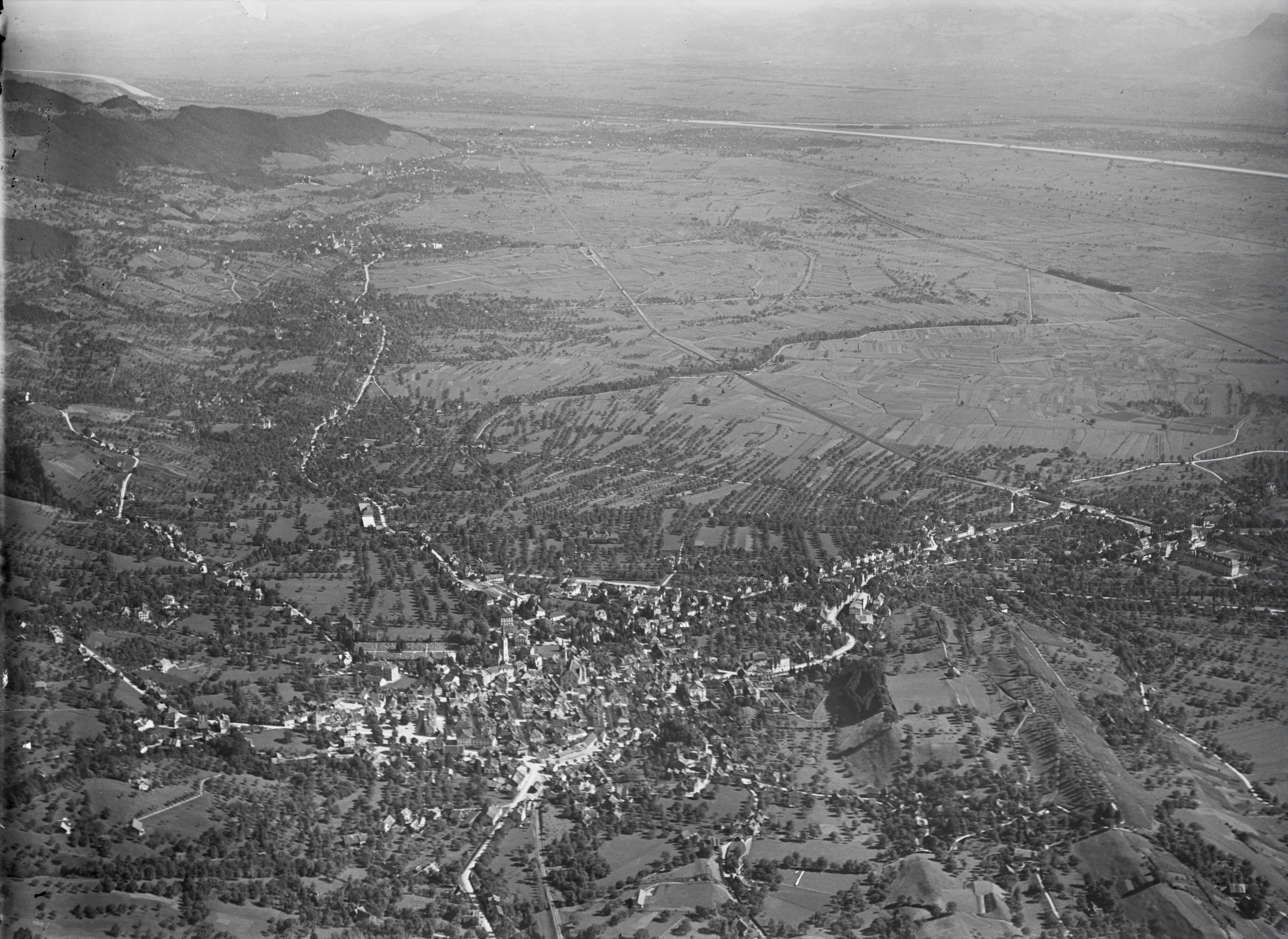
Aerial view by Walter Mittelholzer (1927)

Rebstein has an area, as of 2006, of 4.3 km^{2} (1.7 sq mi). Of this area, 60.4% is used for agricultural purposes, while 7.9% is forested. Of the rest of the land, 30.6% is settled (buildings or roads) and the remainder (1.2%) is non-productive (rivers or lakes).

The municipality is located in the Rheintal Wahlkreis. It stretches from the Rheintaler Binnenkanal (a flood control canal on the Rhine) to the Appenzell foothills.

== Coat of arms ==
The blazon of the municipal coat of arms is Argent a Vine issuant from a Stone proper. The coat of arms is an example of canting where the vines German: Rebe are growing from a stone German: stein.

== Demographics ==
Rebstein has a population (as of 31 December 2020) of 4,640. As of 2007, about 28.2% of the population was made up of foreign nationals. Of the foreign population, (as of 2000), 106 are from Germany, 48 are from Italy, 523 are from ex-Yugoslavia, 108 are from Austria, 85 are from Turkey, and 210 are from another country. Over the last 10 years the population has grown at a rate of 7.5%. Most of the population (as of 2000) speaks German (85.5%), with Albanian being second most common ( 6.0%) and Italian being third ( 1.7%). Of the Swiss national languages (as of 2000), 3,466 speak German, 7 people speak French, 70 people speak Italian, and 5 people speak Romansh.

The age distribution, as of 2000, in Rebstein is; 524 children or 12.9% of the population are between 0 and 9 years old and 589 teenagers or 14.5% are between 10 and 19. Of the adult population, 466 people or 11.5% of the population are between 20 and 29 years old. 648 people or 16.0% are between 30 and 39, 573 people or 14.1% are between 40 and 49, and 493 people or 12.2% are between 50 and 59. The senior population distribution is 363 people or 9.0% of the population are between 60 and 69 years old, 253 people or 6.2% are between 70 and 79, there are 126 people or 3.1% who are between 80 and 89, and there are 20 people or 0.5% who are between 90 and 99.

In 2000 there were 420 persons (or 10.4% of the population) who were living alone in a private dwelling. There were 916 (or 22.6%) persons who were part of a couple (married or otherwise committed) without children, and 2,297 (or 56.6%) who were part of a couple with children. There were 251 (or 6.2%) people who lived in single parent home, while there are 31 persons who were adult children living with one or both parents, 14 persons who lived in a household made up of relatives, 20 who lived household made up of unrelated persons, and 106 who are either institutionalized or live in another type of collective housing.

In the 2007 federal election the most popular party was the SVP which received 42% of the vote. The next three most popular parties were the CVP (22.8%), the SP (14.1%) and the FDP (11.1%).

In Rebstein about 67% of the population (between age 25–64) have completed either non-mandatory upper secondary education or additional higher education (either university or a Fachhochschule). Out of the total population in Rebstein, as of 2000, the highest education level completed by 898 people (22.1% of the population) was Primary, while 1,402 (34.6%) have completed their secondary education, 392 (9.7%) have attended a Tertiary school, and 205 (5.1%) are not in school. The remainder did not answer this question.

The historical population is given in the following table:

year	population
1850	1,582
1900	1,936
1950	2,419
1970	3,414
2000	4,055

== Economy ==
As of 2007, Rebstein had an unemployment rate of 2.66%. As of 2005, there were 41 people employed in the primary economic sector and about 14 businesses involved in this sector. 403 people are employed in the secondary sector and there are 47 businesses in this sector. 715 people are employed in the tertiary sector, with 117 businesses in this sector.

As of October 2009 the average unemployment rate was 5.0%. There were 189 businesses in the municipality of which 50 were involved in the secondary sector of the economy while 128 were involved in the third.

As of 2000 there were 608 residents who worked in the municipality, while 1,455 residents worked outside Rebstein and 502 people commuted into the municipality for work.

== Religion ==
From the 2000 census, 1,937 or 47.8% are Roman Catholic, while 1,065 or 26.3% belonged to the Swiss Reformed Church. Of the rest of the population, there are 99 individuals (or about 2.44% of the population) who belong to the Orthodox Church, and there are 91 individuals (or about 2.24% of the population) who belong to another Christian church. There are 472 (or about 11.64% of the population) who are Islamic. There are 23 individuals (or about 0.57% of the population) who belong to another church (not listed on the census), 231 (or about 5.70% of the population) belong to no church, are agnostic or atheist, and 137 individuals (or about 3.38% of the population) did not answer the question.

== Notable people ==
- Walter Mafli (1915–2017), painter, born in Rebstein.

== See also ==
- Rebstein-Marbach railway station
