= Oberriet railway station =

Railway station in Switzerland

Oberriet
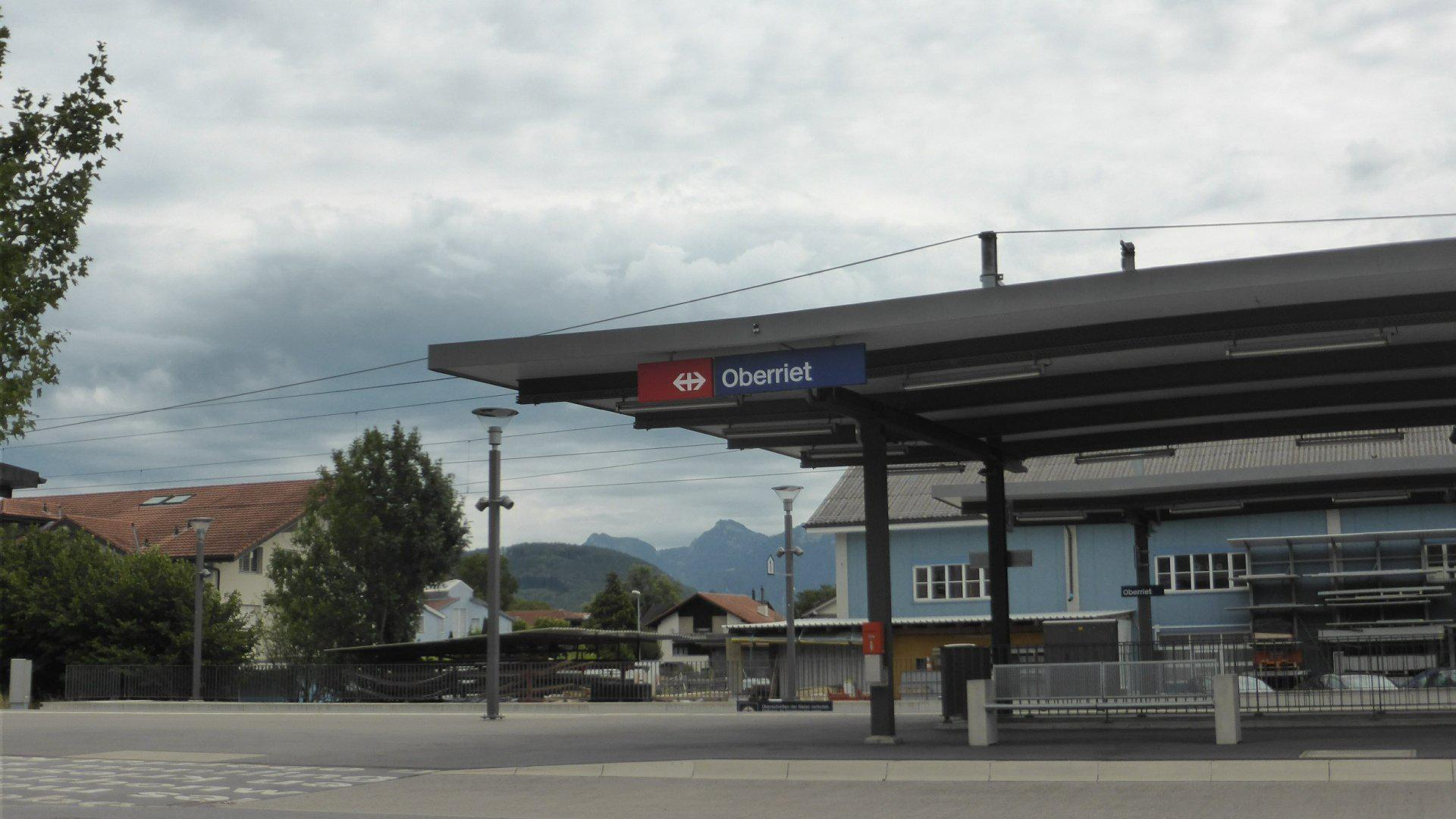
- The station platform in 2018

General information
- Location: Oberriet; Switzerland
- Coordinates: 47°19′N 9°34′E
- Owner: Swiss Federal Railways
- Line: Chur–Rorschach line
- Train operators: Südostbahn

Services
Preceding station	St. Gallen S-Bahn	Following station
Altstätten SG towards Rapperswil	S4	Rüthi SG towards Sargans
Location
- Location within Switzerland Location within Canton of St. Gallen

Oberriet railway station (German: Bahnhof Oberriet) is a railway station in Oberriet, in the Swiss canton of St. Gallen. It is an intermediate stop on the Chur–Rorschach line.

== Services ==
As of the December 2023 timetable change, the following services stop at Oberriet:

- St. Gallen S-Bahn S4: hourly service between Rapperswil and Sargans via St. Gallen.
