= Walter Mafli =

Swiss painter

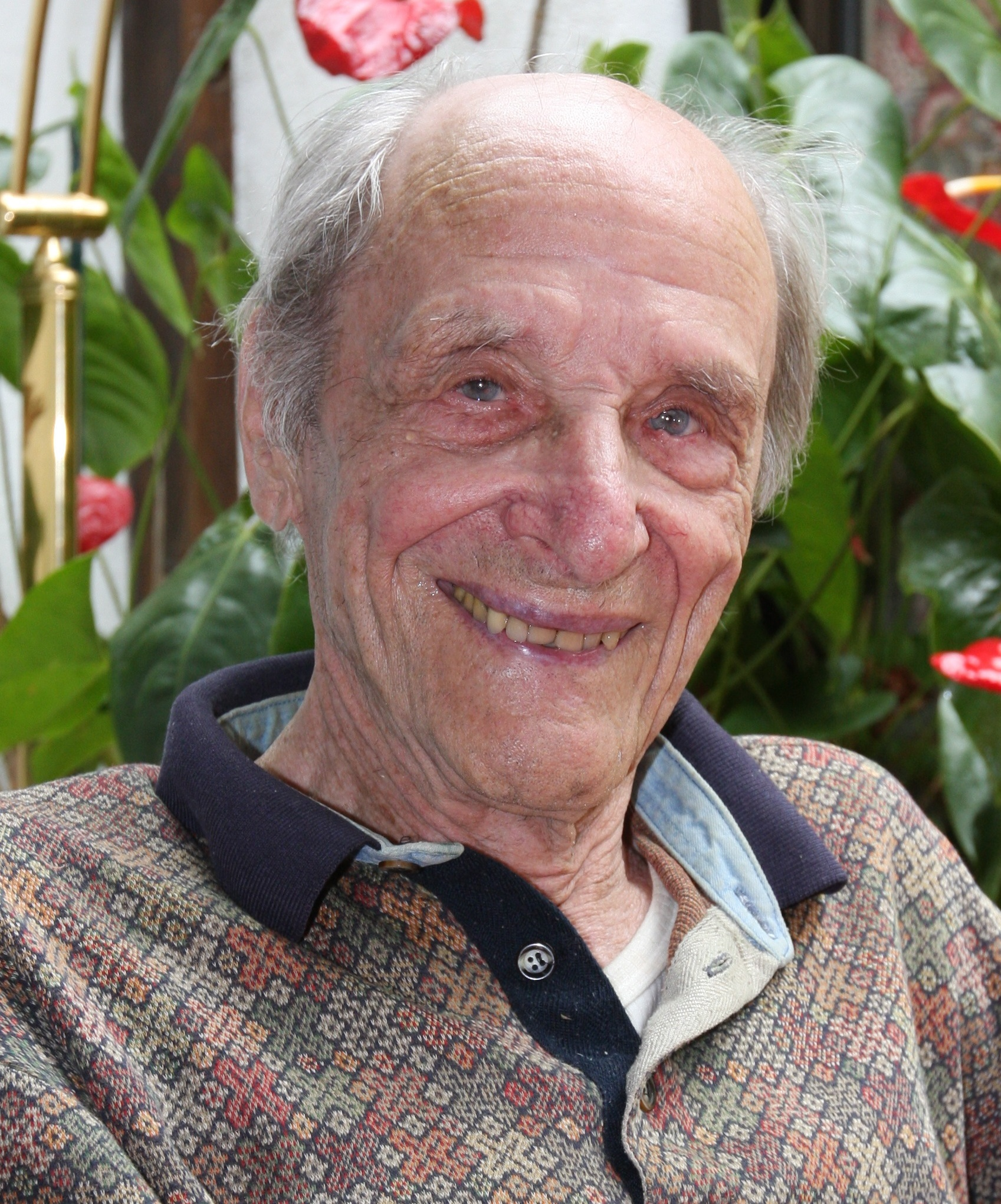
- Walter Mafli in 2012
- Born: 10 May 1915; Rebstein, Canton of St. Gallen, Switzerland
- Died: 11 December 2017 (aged 102); Lutry, Vaud Switzerland
- Occupation: Painter

Walter Mafli (10 May 1915 – 11 December 2017) was a Swiss painter.
