= Elizabeth of Reute =

German Franciscan mystic and saint

Blessed Elizabeth of Reute T.O.R.
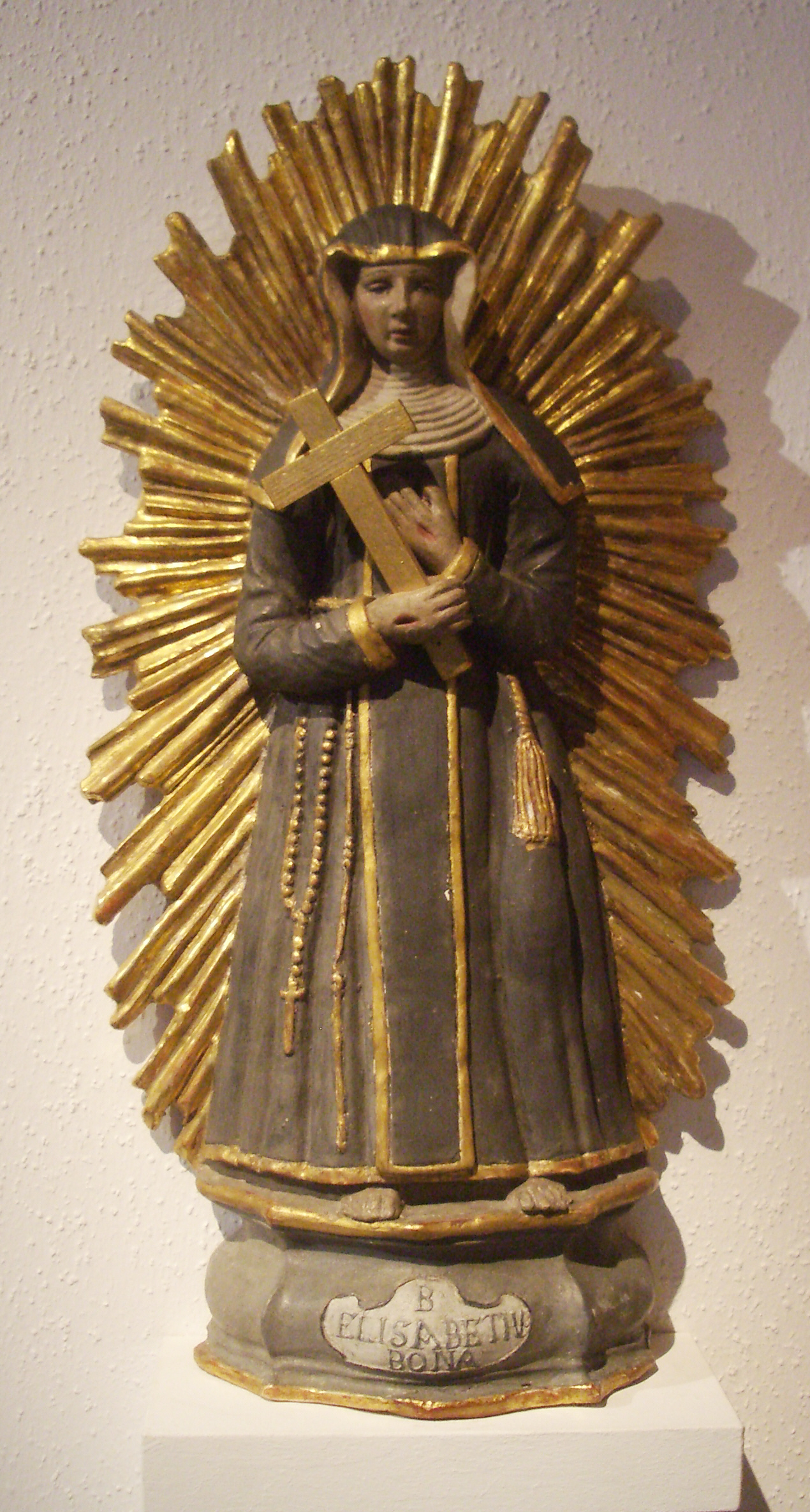
- Image of St. Elizabeth the Good, T.O.R., in the Kornhausmuseum, Bad Waldsee, Germany
- Born: 25 November 1386; Waldsee, Upper Swabia
- Died: 25 November 1420; Waldsee, Upper Swabia
- Venerated in: Roman Catholic Church (Germany)
- Beatified: 19 June 1766 by Pope Clement XIII
- Major shrine: Convent of the Franciscan Sisters of Reute; Bad Waldsee, Germany
- Feast: 25 November
- Patronage: Swabia

Elizabeth of Reute, T.O.R., (also known as Betha the Good; Betha von Reute; Elisabeth Acheer; Elisabeth Achlin; Elisabeth Bona von Reute; Elisabeth den Gode; Elisabeth the Good; Elizabeth Acheer; Elizabeth of Reute; Elizabeth the Good; Elizabeth the Recluse; Elsbeth Achler; Elsbeth Achlin; Elsbeth von Reute; 25 November 1386 – 25 November 1420) was a German Franciscan Tertiary sister who is venerated as a mystic and as having borne the stigmata.

== Life ==
Elizabeth was born on 25 November 1386, to Hans and Anna Achler in Waldsee in the region of Upper Swabia (an historic and linguistic region in Germany). She was raised in a pious home, hearing the Gospels explained to her by her mother in the form of stories, where she developed a strong devotion to the Passion of Christ. She became a member of the Third Order of St. Francis at the age of fourteen. Seeking to further her spiritual growth, she took as her confessor the provost of the local Canonry of St. Peter in Waldsee, Konrad Kügelin. Under his guidance, she and several other girls who belonged to that Franciscan fraternity sought to follow a more intense experience of their Franciscan vocation. To this end, they acquired a house in Reute on the outskirts of Waldsee in 1403.

This community was a proto-monastery of the Order, as tertiaries of the mendicant orders had not yet been allowed to profess vows. Elizabeth threw herself into a life of prayer and service, working in the cloister kitchen and in the garden, where she would spend long hours in prayer.

She was known for her hospitality to visitors to the little monastery, especially for her concern for the poor who came to the gate to beg. Her love of the Blessed Sacrament was so great that she lived the last twelve years of her life subsisting solely on the consecrated hosts. She died on her birthday in 1420.

Her head is said to have shown the marks of the crown of thorns worn by Christ, and her body the marks of Christ's scourging. Although stigmata only occasionally appeared on her hands, she always felt its pain. She was credited with the gift of prophecy foretelling the election of Pope Martin V and the end of the Great Western Schism.

== Veneration ==
She was buried in the parish church of Reute. A biography of her was written by Kügelin, her confessor, and sent to the Bishop of Konstanz. However, popular veneration for Elizabeth occurred only after 1623, when her tomb was opened by the then-provost of Waldsee. Miracles were attributed to her, which were compiled into a formal document by a contemporary canon, Heinrich Scheffler (d. 1635). Pope Clement XIII officially approved her cultus on 19 June 1766. Her feast day is celebrated in Germany on 25 November.
