= Reute =

- Municipality
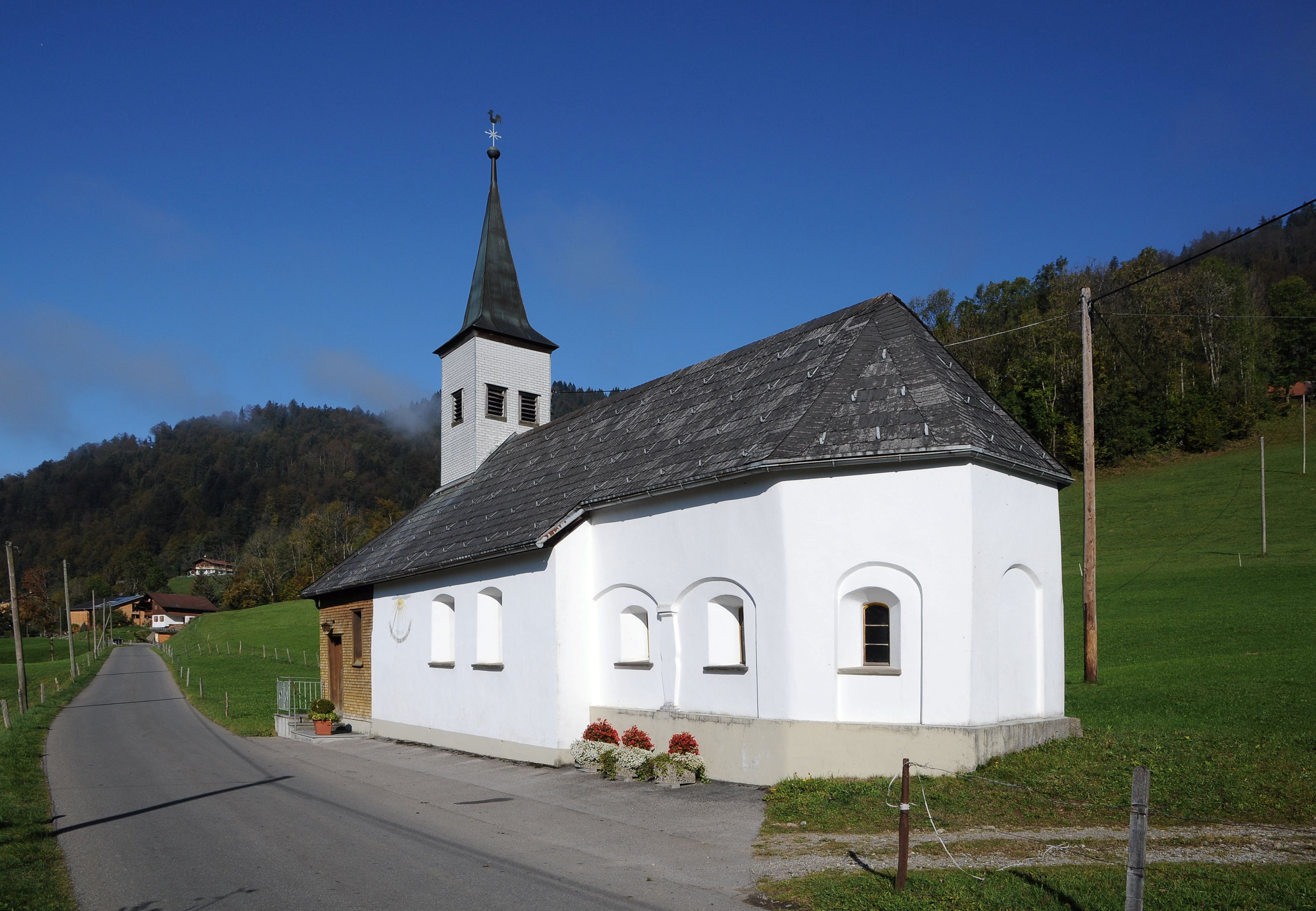

- Flag Coat of arms
- Location of Reute
- Location within Switzerland Location within Canton of Appenzell Ausserrhoden
- Coordinates: 47°25′N 9°35′E
- Country: Switzerland
- Canton: Appenzell Ausserrhoden
- District: n.a.

Area
  - Total: 4.99 km^{2} (1.93 sq mi)
- Elevation: 721 m (2,365 ft)

Population (December 2008)
  - Total: 679
  - Density: 136/km^{2} (352/sq mi)
- Time zone: UTC+01:00 (CET)
  - Summer (DST): UTC+02:00 (CEST)
- Postal code: 9411
- SFOS number: 3035
- ISO 3166 code: CH-AR
- Surrounded by: Balgach (SG), Heiden, Marbach (SG), Oberegg (AI), Rebstein (SG)
- Website: www.reute.ch

Reute (Swiss Standard German pronunciation: [ˈrɔʏtɛ]) is a municipality in the canton of Appenzell Ausserrhoden in Switzerland.

== History ==
Aerial view (1970)

Reute was created due to the division of Appenzell in the wake of the Reformation. Some communities were left in the old faith, others turned themselves to the new faith. When the canton of Appenzell was divided in 1597 into a Catholic and a Protestant part of the canton, the Catholic majority of Hirschberg wanted to stay with Innerrhoden, while the Protestant minority wanted to go to Ausserrhoden. In the division of Appenzell (known as the Landteilungsbrief, literally Land division letter or treaty), the land owned by the Protestants was separated from Hirschberg and given to the Protestant Ausserrhoden, where it became the municipality of Reute. Catholic Hirschberg became part of the Innerrhoden municipality of Oberegg.

== Geography ==
Reute has an area, (as of the 2004/09 survey) of 4.99 km^{2} (1.93 sq mi). Of this area, about 40.2% is used for agricultural purposes, while 53.5% is forested. Of the rest of the land, 6.3% is settled (buildings or roads).

In the 2004/09 survey a total of 16 ha (40 acres) or about 3.2% of the total area was covered with buildings, an increase of 3 ha (7.4 acres) over the 1983/84 amount. Of the agricultural land, 5 ha (12 acres) is used for orchards and vineyards and 199 ha (490 acres) is fields and grasslands. Since 1983/84 the amount of agricultural land has decreased by 4 ha (9.9 acres). Rivers and lakes cover 1 ha (2.5 acres) in the municipality.

Reute is divided into three districts which are individual hamlets: Mohren (110 people), Reute (190 people) and Schachen (390 people). The church is more than 300 years old.

== Demographics ==
Reute has a population (as of December 2020) of 690. As of 2014, 15.6% of the population are resident foreign nationals. Over the last 4 years (2010-2014) the population has changed at a rate of 2.12%. The birth rate in the municipality, in 2014, was 6.0, while the death rate was 4.5 per thousand residents.

Most of the population (as of 2000) speaks German (97.3%), with Albanian being second most common (1.0%) and French being third (0.4%).

As of 2014, children and teenagers (0–19 years old) make up 16.8% of the population, while adults (20–64 years old) are 61.6% and seniors (over 64 years old) make up 21.7%. In 2015 there were 270 single residents, 327 people who were married or in a civil partnership, 39 widows or widowers and 56 divorced residents.

In 2014 there were 301 private households in Reute (AR) with an average household size of 2.23 persons. Of the 284 inhabited buildings in the municipality, in 2000, about 66.9% were single family homes and 8.8% were multiple family buildings. Additionally, about 62.3% of the buildings were built before 1919, while 10.6% were built between 1991 and 2000. In 2013 the rate of construction of new housing units per 1000 residents was 1.51. The vacancy rate for the municipality, in 2015, was 2.39%.

The historical population is given in the following chart:

== Politics ==
In the 2015 federal election the most popular party was the FDP with 36.2% of the vote. The next three most popular parties were the SVP (34.7%), the SP (23.9%) and other local parties (5.2%). In the federal election, a total of 217 votes were cast, and the voter turnout was 43.7%. The 2015 election saw a large change in the voting when compared to 2011. The percentage of the vote received by the FDP increased from 28.6% in 2011 and the SP percentage increased from 0% to 23.9%. The percentage that the SVP received dropped from 40.2% to 34.7%.

In the 2007 federal election the FDP received 63.4% of the vote.

== Education ==
In Reute about 68.8% of the population (between age 25-64) have completed either non-mandatory upper secondary education or additional higher education (either university or a Fachhochschule).

== Economy ==
Reute is classed as a growing bedroom community with many new residents.

As of 2014, there were a total of 209 people employed in the municipality. Of these, a total of 29 people worked in 12 businesses in the primary economic sector. The secondary sector employed 35 workers in 13 separate businesses. Finally, the tertiary sector provided 145 jobs in 40 businesses. There was one small business with a total of 29 employees.

In 2014 a total of 1.5% of the population received social assistance.

== See also ==
- Elizabeth of Reute
