= Pfandherr =

Creditor in the German nobility

In German nobility, a Pfandherr (Pledge Lord) was a creditor, mostly of the lower nobility (Niederer Adel), who lent money to a noble higher in the feudal hierarchy, and as security received the usage of a territory belonging to the debtor, which was then known as a Pfandherrschaft (pledge lordship). The use usually included all the rights and revenues of the owner, such as taxes, duties, forest exploitation, hunting and fishing rights, etc. The pledged territory remained the possession of the original owner and could be redeemed by termination of the pledge contract and refund of the borrowed money, usually with interest. Since the socially superior debtor feudal lord or prince was much more powerful, it also happened that, for lack of money, only part of the deposit was repaid or the debt was settled in installments.

== See also ==
- Pledge (law)
