= Rüthi SG railway station =

Railway station in Switzerland

Rüthi SG
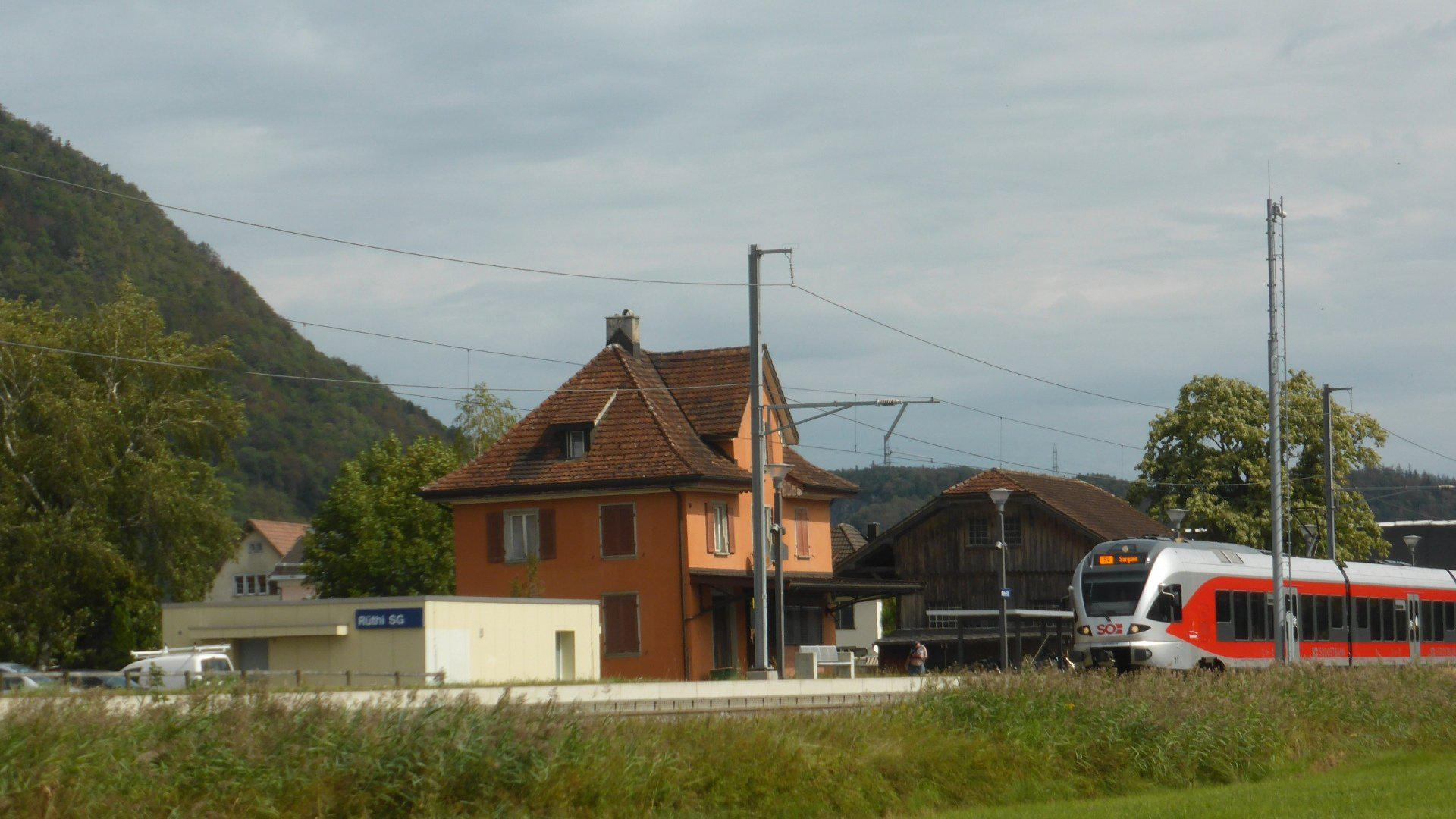
- Südostbahn-operated S4 service at the station in 2018

General information
- Location: Rüthi; Switzerland
- Coordinates: 47°17′N 9°32′E
- Owner: Swiss Federal Railways
- Line: Chur–Rorschach line
- Train operators: Südostbahn

Services
Preceding station	St. Gallen S-Bahn	Following station
Oberriet towards Rapperswil	S4	Salez-Sennwald towards Sargans
Location
- Location within Switzerland Location within Canton of St. Gallen

Rüthi SG railway station (German: Bahnhof Rüthi SG) is a railway station in Rüthi, in the Swiss canton of St. Gallen (abbreviated to SG). It is an intermediate stop on the Chur–Rorschach line.

== Services ==
As of the December 2023 timetable change, the following services stop at Rüthi SG:

- St. Gallen S-Bahn S4: hourly service between Rapperswil and Sargans via St. Gallen.
