= Oberegg District =

Oberegg District Bezirk Oberegg
- District
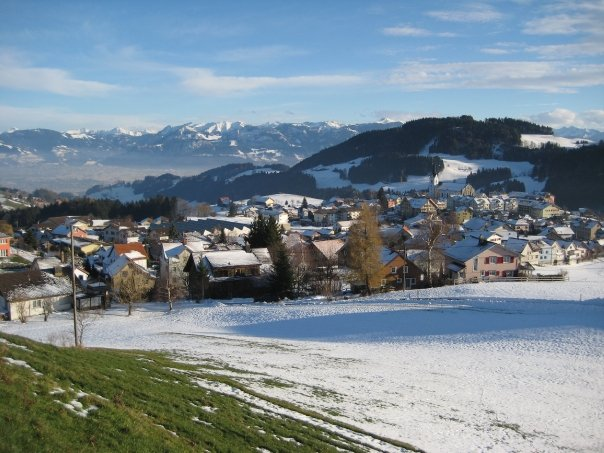

- Flag Coat of arms
- Coordinates: 47°25′N 9°33′E
- Country: Switzerland
- Canton: Appenzell Innerrhoden

Area
  - Total: 14.67 km^{2} (5.66 sq mi)
- Elevation: 870 m (2,850 ft)

Population (December 2020)
  - Total: 1,926
  - Density: 131.3/km^{2} (340.0/sq mi)
- Time zone: UTC+1 (CET)
  - Summer (DST): UTC+2 (CEST)
- Postal code: 9413
- SFOS number: 3111
- Municipalities: None
- Website: www.oberegg.ch

Oberegg District is a district in the canton of Appenzell Innerrhoden in Switzerland. It comprises three small exclaves of the canton (the smallest of which is a single monastery), a few kilometers northeast of the rest of Appenzell Innerrhoden.

== History ==
Aerial view (1949)

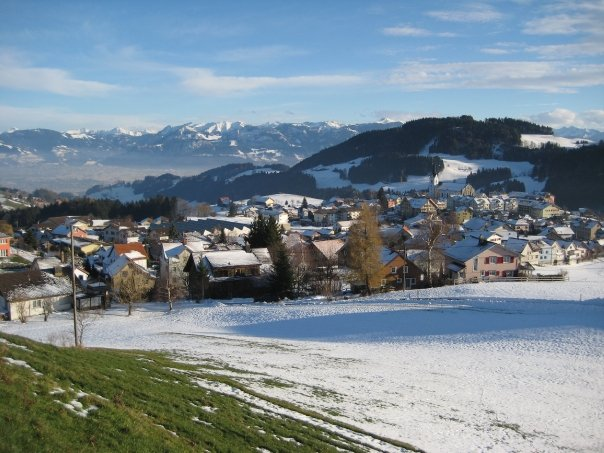
Oberegg in 2009

Oberegg is first mentioned in 1470 as a village. Around the time that the church was built (finished in 1655) Oberegg had grown to encompass the region surrounding the village.

The municipality was formally established in 1872 when Hirschberg and Oberegg joined.

Hirschberg was first mentioned in the 11th century as Hirsberg. Hirschberg was divided during the division of Appenzell in the wake of the Reformation. Some communities were left in the old faith, others turned themselves to the new faith. When the canton of Appenzell was divided in 1597 into a Catholic and a Protestant part of the canton, the Catholic majority of Hirschberg wanted to stay with Innerrhoden, while the Protestant minority wanted to go to Ausserrhoden. In the division of Appenzell (known as the Landteilungsbrief, literally Land division letter or treaty), the land owned by the Protestants was separated from Hirschberg and given to the Protestant Ausserrhoden, where it became the municipality of Reute. Catholic Hirschberg would later become part of the Innerrhoden municipality of Oberegg.

== Geography ==
Oberegg has an area, as of 2011, of 14.7 square kilometers (5.7 sq mi). Of this area, 51.8% is used for agricultural purposes, while 42.5% is forested. Of the rest of the land, 5.5% is settled (buildings or roads) and 0.1% is unproductive land.

The district is the outermost portion of the half-canton toward the Rhine valley (German: Rheintal). It consists of the village of Oberegg and the hamlets of Büriswilen, Kapf, Eschenmoos, Sankt Anton and numerous individual farm houses.

== Coat of arms ==
The blazon of the municipal coat of arms is Impaled per chevron Sable a Mullet Or and Vert a Cross couped pattee Argent and of the last a Deer Gules trippant on a Mount of 3 Coupeaux Vert.

The coat of arms is a divided vertically to show the coat of arms of Hirschenberg (right hand side) and Oberegg (left hand side). On the left hand side there is a silver cross on a green background at the bottom. At the top, the background is black with a golden star. On the right hand side, the bottom of the coat of arms shows three mounts in green. At the top there is a red deer strutting on a silver background.

== Demographics ==
Oberegg has a population (as of December 2020) of 1,926. As of 2008, 8.3% of the population are resident foreign nationals. Over the last 10 years (1999–2009) the population has changed at a rate of 3.5%. It has changed at a rate of 8.2% due to migration and at a rate of 0.5% due to births and deaths.

Most of the population (as of 2000) speaks German (1,738 or 96.8%), with Albanian being second most common (13 or 0.7%) and Italian being third (8 or 0.4%). There are 3 people who speak French and 2 people who speak Romansh.

Of the population in the district 933 or about 51.9% were born in Oberegg and lived there in 2000. There were 31 or 1.7% who were born in the same canton, while 659 or 36.7% were born somewhere else in Switzerland, and 154 or 8.6% were born outside of Switzerland.

In 2008 there were 15 live births to Swiss citizens and 2 births to non-Swiss citizens, and in same time span there were 22 deaths of Swiss citizens. Ignoring immigration and emigration, the population of Swiss citizens decreased by 7 while the foreign population increased by 2. There were 6 non-Swiss men and 2 non-Swiss women who immigrated from another country to Switzerland. The total Swiss population change in 2008 (from all sources, including moves across municipal borders) was an increase of 22 and the non-Swiss population increased by 5 people. This represents a population growth rate of 1.4%.

As of 2000, there were 764 people who were single and never married in the district. There were 870 married individuals, 83 widows or widowers and 79 individuals who are divorced.

As of 2000 the average number of residents per living room was 0.55 which is about equal to the cantonal average of 0.59 per room. In this case, a room is defined as space of a housing unit of at least 4 m^{2} (43 sq ft) as normal bedrooms, dining rooms, living rooms, kitchens and habitable cellars and attics. About 67.6% of the total households were owner occupied, or in other words did not pay rent (though they may have a mortgage or a rent-to-own agreement).

As of 2000, there were 680 private households in the district, and an average of 2.6 persons per household. There were 173 households that consist of only one person and 82 households with five or more people. Out of a total of 689 households that answered this question, 25.1% were households made up of just one person and there were 15 adults who lived with their parents. Of the rest of the households, there are 201 married couples without children, 252 married couples with children There were 28 single parents with a child or children. There were 11 households that were made up of unrelated people and 9 households that were made up of some sort of institution or another collective housing.

In 2000 there were 425 single family homes (or 61.4% of the total) out of a total of 692 inhabited buildings. There were 46 multi-family buildings (6.6%), along with 178 multi-purpose buildings that were mostly used for housing (25.7%) and 43 other use buildings (commercial or industrial) that also had some housing (6.2%). Of the single family homes 234 were built before 1919, while 34 were built between 1990 and 2000.

In 2000 there were 852 apartments in the district. The most common apartment size was 4 rooms of which there were 234. There were 11 single room apartments and 394 apartments with five or more rooms. Of these apartments, a total of 660 apartments (77.5% of the total) were permanently occupied, while 130 apartments (15.3%) were seasonally occupied and 62 apartments (7.3%) were empty. As of 2009, the construction rate of new housing units was 0.5 new units per 1000 residents. The vacancy rate for the district, in 2010, was 1.35%.

The historical population is given in the following chart:

== Politics ==
In the 2007 federal election the CVP received 90.13% of the vote. In the federal election, a total of 334 votes were cast, and the voter turnout was 24.9%.

== Economy ==
As of 2010, Oberegg had an unemployment rate of 0.8%. As of 2008, there were 127 people employed in the primary economic sector and about 61 businesses involved in this sector. 309 people were employed in the secondary sector and there were 37 businesses in this sector. 200 people were employed in the tertiary sector, with 58 businesses in this sector. There were 876 residents of the district who were employed in some capacity, of which females made up 39.5% of the workforce.

In 2008 the total number of full-time equivalent jobs was 523. The number of jobs in the primary sector was 81, all of which were in agriculture. The number of jobs in the secondary sector was 287 of which 212 or (73.9%) were in manufacturing and 75 (26.1%) were in construction. The number of jobs in the tertiary sector was 155. In the tertiary sector; 42 or 27.1% were in the sale or repair of motor vehicles, 19 or 12.3% were in the movement and storage of goods, 24 or 15.5% were in a hotel or restaurant, 4 or 2.6% were in the information industry, 6 or 3.9% were the insurance or financial industry, 11 or 7.1% were technical professionals or scientists, 26 or 16.8% were in education and 10 or 6.5% were in health care.

In 2000, there were 236 workers who commuted into the district and 516 workers who commuted away. The district is a net exporter of workers, with about 2.2 workers leaving the district for every one entering. About 16.9% of the workforce coming into Oberegg are coming from outside Switzerland, while 1.0% of the locals commute out of Switzerland for work. Of the working population, 9% used public transportation to get to work, and 54.8% used a private car.

== Religion ==
From the 2000 census, 1,269 or 70.7% were Roman Catholic, while 348 or 19.4% belonged to the Swiss Reformed Church. Of the rest of the population, there were 4 members of an Orthodox church (or about 0.22% of the population), there was 1 individual who belongs to the Christian Catholic Church, and there were 32 individuals (or about 1.78% of the population) who belonged to another Christian church. There were 34 (or about 1.89% of the population) who were Islamic. 86 (or about 4.79% of the population) belonged to no church, are agnostic or atheist, and 22 individuals (or about 1.22% of the population) did not answer the question.

== Education ==
In Oberegg about 637 or (35.5%) of the population have completed non-mandatory upper secondary education, and 158 or (8.8%) have completed additional higher education (either university or a Fachhochschule). Of the 158 who completed tertiary schooling, 66.5% were Swiss men, 19.0% were Swiss women, 10.1% were non-Swiss men and 4.4% were non-Swiss women.

As of 2000, there were 41 students in Oberegg who came from another district, while 35 residents attended schools outside the district.
