= Heinrich Wild =

Swiss inventor (1877–1951)

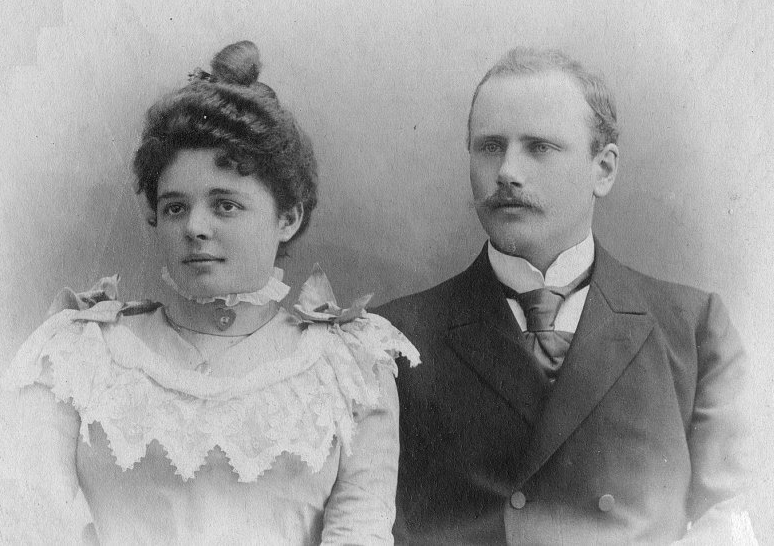
Heinrich and Lilly Wild (1900)

Heinrich Wild (Mitlödi, Canton of Glarus, 15 November 1877 – Baden, Switzerland, 26 December 1951) was a Swiss businessman, industrial designer, and inventor who was the founder of Wild Heerbrugg, a Swiss optical instruments manufacturing company.

== Biography ==
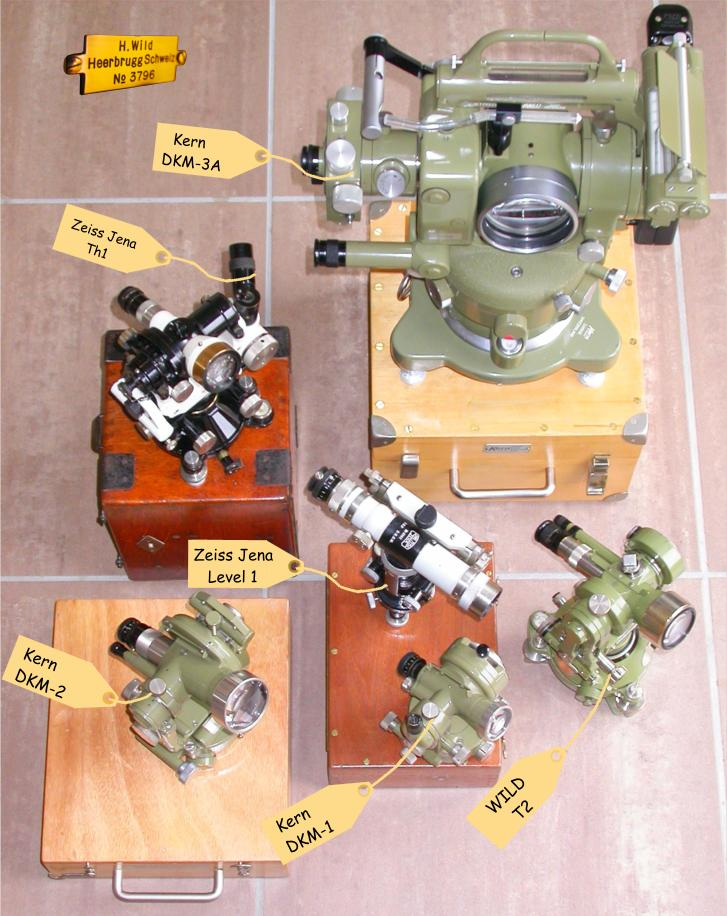
Designs by H. Wild

At 15 years of age, Wild became an apprentice with the engineer Legler in Glarus (hydraulic engineer for the Linth River). He bought a small theodolite, and after a short time independently made expanded measurements of the flow of the river Linth. Later Wild joined the Geometerschule (geometer school) at Winterthur and came in 1899 as a trainee to the Landestopographie (Swisstopo is a popular designation for the Swiss Federal Office of Topography) in Bern. Due to his bad experiences with the high mountain triangulation with a theodolite of conventional design, he tried in 1905 to design a new theodolite with rotable circle with coincidence circle-readings.

In 1907 he left the Landestopographie and moved to Jena, Germany, where he joined the company Carl Zeiss to build up a new department for producing geodetic instruments. He began with the development of levelling instruments and designed later also a new theodolite, the Th I.

In 1921 Wild returned to Switzerland and founded with Dr. R. Helbling, who run an office for land surveying, and with the politician Jacob Schmidheiny, the company Heinrich Wild, Werkstätte für Feinmechanik und Optik (later known as Wild Heerbrugg, Wild-Leitz AG, Leica Geosystems, Leica Microsystems, Leica Camera).

At this time he developed the first versions of the famous universal theodolite Wild T series and also the stereo autograph Wild A1 for aerial photo interpretation, besides a number of other measurement instruments.

It may be perhaps typical for the inventors like Wild that he worried little about the financial condition of his company, and this ended finally with the consequence that Wild separated in 1932 from the company he founded, in order to be able to work as a freelance technical designer and inventor. He continued designing up until his death in 1951. Among his designs were the DK1, DKM1, DM2, DKM2, and DKM3, for Kern & Co, Aarau, besides other things.

The ETH Zurich honoured him with the title Dr. honoris causa in 1930.

His biography was published in the Historical Dictionary of Switzerland as well as by the ETHZ.
