= Cinetheodolite =

Instrument for collection of trajectory data

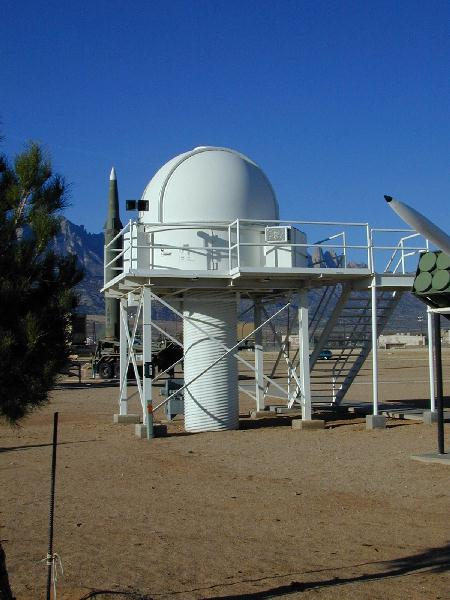
Contraves cinetheodolite electro-optical tracking system dome

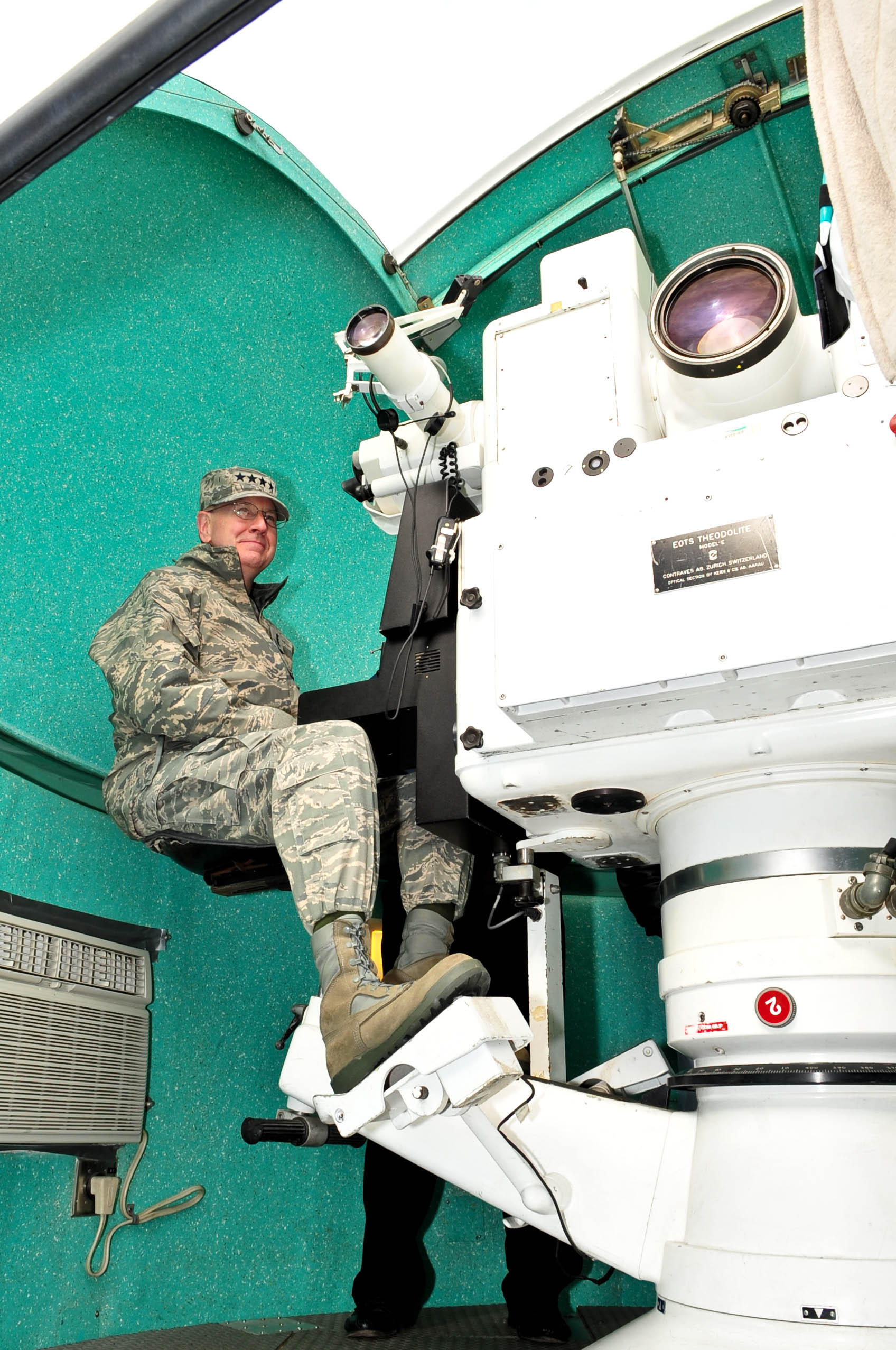
The Air Force Space Command commander sits in a cinetheodolite at the Cape Canaveral Air Force Station

A cinetheodolite or kinetheodolite is a photographic instrument for collection of trajectory data. It can be used to acquire data in the testing of missiles, rockets, projectiles, aircraft, and fire control systems; in the ripple firing of rockets, graze action tests, air burst fuze tests, and similar operations. Cinetheodolites provide angular measurements of the line of sight to the vehicle. This permits acquiring accurate position data. Together with timing systems, velocity and acceleration data can be developed from the position measurements. Cinetheodolites can serve as primary sources of position and velocity data to about 30 km slant range.

These instruments were developed from theodolites by the addition of a movie camera, adding the ability to track a vehicle in flight and so obtain continuous trajectory data.

== Introduction ==
One of the objectives of testing missile and rocket systems is to determine the actual "in-flight" performance of the vehicles themselves. One of the prime requirements for establishing the performance of vehicles in flight is to obtain accurate data which will reveal the position in space and the attitude of the vehicle during its trajectory. The employment of optics at a missile range may become highly significant in obtaining these data, if the atmosphere permits reasonably unobstructed observation, and if, moreover, an all-land test area makes possible optimum siting of instruments for most desirable look angles. Under these conditions, optics in general, and photogrammetry in particular, correlated with other instrumentation systems, can provide effective and accurate data of target trajectory.

== Description ==
The cinetheodolite is a combination motion-picture-recording and surveying instrument which tracks and photographs targets (in flight vehicles, etc.). Cinetheodolites are employed in synchronized pairs, and azimuth/elevation data recorded on film is later reduced by trigonometry to establish position and movement of the target at a given moment. The recorded visual images and synchronizing pulse assure accuracy. German and UK WW2 cinetheodolites were large and complex, requiring two operators while USA versions were more compact with a single operator. The USA instruments served wartime and postwar aviation research and aircraft/missile evaluation (White Sands Test Base/Missile Range) until 1950 and the arrival of the more capable German Askania units.

Postwar models had selectable frame rates. Some cinetheodolites have rate-aided tracking control, whereby an open loop servomechanism in conjunction with operator actuated hand wheels match the angular rates of the tracking axis with the angular rates of the target line of position.

Cinetheodolites consist of a stable base and bearing, a vertical gimbal or trunnion carrier which rotates about a vertical axis normal to the plane of the base; a central drum or housing which contains the system telescopic lenses, plus a camera and film assembly; a horizontal trunnion shaft on which the central drum is mounted so that it can rise or dip about the horizontal axis; and the sighting telescopes, which are also mounted on the horizontal trunnion shaft.

The first 3:43 of the flight of Apollo 11, filmed by a cinetheodolite

== Manufacturers ==
Notable cinetheodolite manufacturers include Ackeley Camera Co., Mitchell Camera Corp., J. W. Fecker Division, American Optical Co., Pittsburgh, Pa. (USA), iMAR Navigation GmbH, St. Ingbert (Germany), "Askania Werke Rathenow" (Germany), Rheinmetall Air Defence (formerly Contraves AG, Switzerland), and BELOMO (Belarus). PhotoSonics, Inc. (California, USA)
