= Length measurement =

Ways in which length, distance or range can be measured

Length measurement, distance measurement, or range measurement (ranging) all refer to the many ways in which length, distance, or range can be measured. The most commonly used approaches are the rulers, followed by transit-time methods and the interferometer methods based upon the speed of light. Surveying is one ancient use of measuring long distances.

For tiny objects such as crystals and diffraction gratings, diffraction is used with X-ray light, or even electron beams. Measurement techniques for three-dimensional structures very small in every dimension use specialized instruments such as ion microscopy coupled with intensive computer modeling. These techniques are employed, for example, to measure the tiny features on wafers during the manufacture of chips.

== Standard rulers ==
The ruler is the simplest kind of length measurement tool: lengths are defined by printed marks or engravings on a stick. The metre was initially defined using a ruler before more accurate methods became available.

Gauge blocks are a common method for precise measurement or calibration of measurement tools.

For small or microscopic objects, microphotography where the length is calibrated using a graticule can be used. A graticule is a piece that has lines for precise lengths etched into it. Graticules may be fitted into the eyepiece or they may be used on the measurement plane.

== Transit-time measurement ==
The basic idea behind a transit-time measurement of length is to send a signal from one end of the length to be measured to the other, and back again. The time for the round trip is the transit time Δt, and the length l is then 2l = Δt × v, with v the speed of propagation of the signal, assuming that it is the same in both directions. If light is used for the signal, its speed depends upon the medium in which it propagates; in SI units the speed is a defined value c_{0} in the reference medium of classical vacuum. Thus, when light is used in a transit-time approach, length measurements are not subject to knowledge of the source frequency (apart from possible frequency dependence of the correction to relate the medium to classical vacuum), but are subject to the error in measuring transit times, in particular, errors introduced by the response times of the pulse emission and detection instrumentation. An additional uncertainty is the refractive index correction relating the medium used to the reference vacuum, taken in SI units to be the classical vacuum. A refractive index of the medium larger than one slows the light.

Transit-time measurement underlies most radio navigation systems for boats and aircraft, for example, radar and the nearly obsolete Long Range Aid to Navigation LORAN-C. For example, in one radar system, pulses of electromagnetic radiation are sent out by the vehicle (interrogating pulses) and trigger a response from a responder beacon. The time interval between the sending and the receiving of a pulse is monitored and used to determine a distance. In the global positioning system a code of ones and zeros is emitted at a known time from multiple satellites, and their times of arrival are noted at a receiver along with the time they were sent (encoded in the messages). Assuming the receiver clock can be related to the synchronized clocks on the satellites, the transit time can be found and used to provide the distance to each satellite. Receiver clock error is corrected by combining the data from four satellites.

Such techniques vary in accuracy according to the distances over which they are intended for use. For example, LORAN-C is accurate to about 6 km, GPS about 10 m, enhanced GPS, in which a correction signal is transmitted from terrestrial stations (that is, differential GPS (DGPS)) or via satellites (that is, Wide Area Augmentation System (WAAS)) can bring accuracy to a few metres or < 1 metre, or, in specific applications, tens of centimetres. Time-of-flight systems for robotics (for example, Laser Detection and Ranging LADAR and Light Detection and Ranging LIDAR) aim at lengths of 10–100 m and have an accuracy of about 5–10 mm.

== Interferometer measurements ==
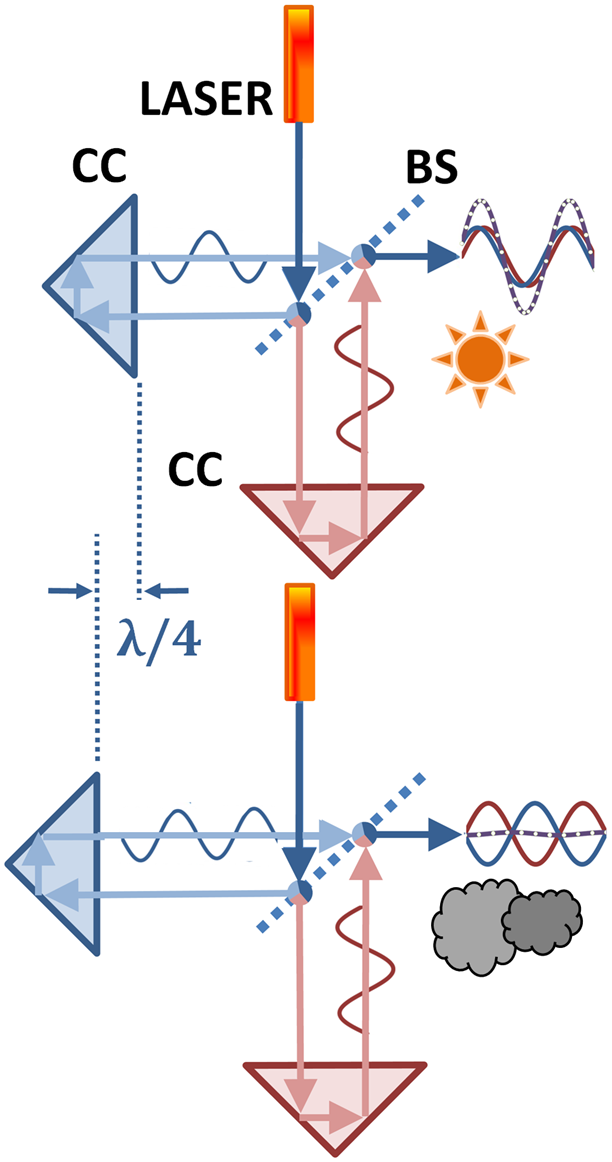
Measuring a length in wavelengths of light using an interferometer.

In many practical circumstances, and for precision work, measurement of dimension using transit-time measurements is used only as an initial indicator of length and is refined using an interferometer. Generally, transit time measurements are preferred for longer lengths, and interferometers for shorter lengths.

The figure shows schematically how length is determined using a Michelson interferometer: the two panels show a laser source emitting a light beam split by a beam splitter (BS) to travel two paths. The light is recombined by bouncing the two components off a pair of corner cubes (CC) that return the two components to the beam splitter again to be reassembled. The corner cube serves to displace the incident from the reflected beam, which avoids some complications caused by superposing the two beams. The distance between the left-hand corner cube and the beam splitter is compared to that separation on the fixed leg as the left-hand spacing is adjusted to compare the length of the object to be measured.

In the top panel the path is such that the two beams reinforce each other after reassembly, leading to a strong light pattern (sun). The bottom panel shows a path that is made a half wavelength longer by moving the left-hand mirror a quarter wavelength further away, increasing the path difference by a half wavelength. The result is the two beams are in opposition to each other at reassembly, and the recombined light intensity drops to zero (clouds). Thus, as the spacing between the mirrors is adjusted, the observed light intensity cycles between reinforcement and cancellation as the number of wavelengths of path difference changes, and the observed intensity alternately peaks (bright sun) and dims (dark clouds). This behavior is called interference and the machine is called an interferometer. By counting fringes it is found how many wavelengths long the measured path is compared to the fixed leg. In this way, measurements are made in units of wavelengths λ corresponding to a particular atomic transition. The length in wavelengths can be converted to a length in units of metres if the selected transition has a known frequency f. The length as a certain number of wavelengths λ is related to the metre using λ = c_{0} / f. With c_{0} a defined value of 299,792,458 m/s, the error in a measured length in wavelengths is increased by this conversion to metres by the error in measuring the frequency of the light source.

By using sources of several wavelengths to generate sum and difference beat frequencies, absolute distance measurements become possible.

This methodology for length determination requires a careful specification of the wavelength of the light used, and is one reason for employing a laser source where the wavelength can be held stable. Regardless of stability, however, the precise frequency of any source has linewidth limitations. Other significant errors are introduced by the interferometer itself; in particular: errors in light beam alignment, collimation and fractional fringe determination. Corrections also are made to account for departures of the medium (for example, air) from the reference medium of classical vacuum. Resolution using wavelengths is in the range of ΔL/L ≈ 10^{−9} – 10^{−11} depending upon the length measured, the wavelength and the type of interferometer used.

The measurement also requires careful specification of the medium in which the light propagates. A refractive index correction is made to relate the medium used to the reference vacuum, taken in SI units to be the classical vacuum. These refractive index corrections can be found more accurately by adding frequencies, for example, frequencies at which propagation is sensitive to the presence of water vapor. This way non-ideal contributions to the refractive index can be measured and corrected for at another frequency using established theoretical models.

It may be noted again, by way of contrast, that the transit-time measurement of length is independent of any knowledge of the source frequency, except for a possible dependence of the correction relating the measurement medium to the reference medium of classical vacuum, which may indeed depend on the frequency of the source. Where a pulse train or some other wave-shaping is used, a range of frequencies may be involved.

== Diffraction measurements ==
For small objects, different methods are used that also depend upon determining size in units of wavelengths. For instance, in the case of a crystal, atomic spacings can be determined using X-ray diffraction. The present best value for the lattice parameter of silicon, denoted a, is:

a = 543.102 0504(89) × 10^{−12} m,

corresponding to a resolution of ΔL/L ≈ 3 × 10^{−10}. Similar techniques can provide the dimensions of small structures repeated in large periodic arrays like a diffraction grating.

Such measurements allow the calibration of electron microscopes, extending measurement capabilities. For non-relativistic electrons in an electron microscope, the de Broglie wavelength is:

$$\lambda_e = \frac{h}{\sqrt{2m_e e V}} \ ,$$

with V the electrical voltage drop traversed by the electron, m_{e} the electron mass, e the elementary charge, and h the Planck constant. This wavelength can be measured in terms of inter-atomic spacing using a crystal diffraction pattern, and related to the metre through an optical measurement of the lattice spacing on the same crystal. This process of extending calibration is called metrological traceability. The use of metrological traceability to connect different regimes of measurement is similar to the idea behind the cosmic distance ladder for different ranges of astronomical length. Both calibrate different methods for length measurement using overlapping ranges of applicability.

== Distant and moving targets ==
Ranging is a technique that measures distance or slant range from the observer to a target, especially a distant and moving target. Active methods use unilateral transmission and passive reflection. Active rangefinding methods include laser (lidar), radar, sonar, and ultrasonic rangefinding.

Other devices which measure distance using trigonometry are stadiametric, coincidence and stereoscopic rangefinders. Older methodologies that use a set of known information (usually distance or target sizes) to make the measurement, have been in regular use since the 18th century.

Special ranging makes use of actively synchronized transmission and travel time measurements. The time difference between several received signals is used to determine exact distances (upon multiplication by the speed of light). This principle is used in satellite navigation. In conjunction with a standardized model of the Earth's surface, a location on that surface may be determined with high accuracy. Ranging methods without accurate time synchronization of the receiver are called pseudorange, used, for example, in GPS positioning.

With other systems ranging is obtained from passive radiation measurements only: the noise or radiation signature of the object generates the signal that is used to determine range. This asynchronous method requires multiple measurements to obtain a range by taking multiple bearings instead of appropriate scaling of active pings, otherwise the system is just capable of providing a simple bearing from any single measurement.

Combining several measurements in a time sequence leads to tracking and tracing. A commonly used term for residing terrestrial objects is surveying.

== Other techniques ==
Measuring dimensions of localized structures (as opposed to large arrays of atoms like a crystal), as in modern integrated circuits, is done using the scanning electron microscope. This instrument bounces electrons off the object to be measured in a high vacuum enclosure, and the reflected electrons are collected as a photodetector image that is interpreted by a computer. These are not transit-time measurements, but are based upon comparison of Fourier transforms of images with theoretical results from computer modeling. Such elaborate methods are required because the image depends on the three-dimensional geometry of the measured feature, for example, the contour of an edge, and not just upon one- or two-dimensional properties. The underlying limitations are the beam width and the wavelength of the electron beam (determining diffraction), determined, as already discussed, by the electron beam energy. The calibration of these scanning electron microscope measurements is tricky, as results depend upon the material measured and its geometry. A typical wavelength is 0.5 Å, and a typical resolution is about 4 nm.

Other small dimension techniques are the atomic force microscope, the focused ion beam and the helium ion microscope. Calibration is attempted using standard samples measured by transmission electron microscope (TEM).

Nuclear Overhauser effect spectroscopy (NOESY) is a specialized type of nuclear magnetic resonance spectroscopy where distances between atoms can be measured. It is based on the effect where nuclear spin cross-relaxation after excitation by a radio pulse depends on the distance between the nuclei. Unlike spin-spin coupling, NOE propagates through space and does not require that the atoms are connected by bonds, so it is a true distance measurement instead of a chemical measurement. Unlike diffraction measurements, NOESY does not require a crystalline sample, but is done in solution state and can be applied to substances that are difficult to crystallize.

=== Astronomical distance measurement ===
Light green boxes: Technique applicable to star-forming galaxies.; Light blue boxes: Technique applicable to Population II galaxies.; Light Purple boxes: Geometric distance technique.; Light Red box: The planetary nebula luminosity function technique is applicable to all populations of the Virgo Supercluster.; Solid black lines: Well calibrated ladder step.; Dashed black lines: Uncertain calibration ladder step.

The cosmic distance ladder (also known as the extragalactic distance scale) is the succession of methods by which astronomers determine the distances to celestial objects. A direct distance measurement of an astronomical object is possible only for those objects that are "close enough" (within about a thousand parsecs or 3×10^{16} km) to Earth. The techniques for determining distances to more distant objects are all based on various measured correlations between methods that work at close distances and methods that work at larger distances. Several methods rely on a standard candle, which is an astronomical object that has a known luminosity.

The ladder analogy arises because no single technique can measure distances at all ranges encountered in astronomy. Instead, one method can be used to measure nearby distances, a second can be used to measure nearby to intermediate distances, and so on. Each rung of the proverbial ladder provides information that can be used to determine the distances at the next higher rung.

== Other systems of units ==
In some systems of units, unlike the current SI system, lengths are fundamental units (for example, wavelengths in the older SI units and bohrs in atomic units) and are not defined by times of transit. Even in such units, however, the comparison of two lengths can be made by comparing the two transit times of light along the lengths. Such time-of-flight methodology may or may not be more accurate than the determination of a length as a multiple of the fundamental length unit.

== List of devices ==
=== Contact devices ===
- Architect's scale
- Caliper
- Diagonal scale
- Engineer's scale
- Feeler gauge,
  used in metal working to measure size of gaps
- Gauge blocks
- Gunter's chain
- Measuring rod
- Meter stick
- Metric scale
- Micrometer
- Opisometer or curvimeter
- Pacing (surveying)
- Ruler
- Stadimeter
- Surveyor's wheel
- Tape measure
- Thread pitch gauge
- Ultrasonic thickness gauge
- Yard stick

=== Non-contact devices ===
- Ranging

==== Based on time-of-flight ====
- Electronic distance meter
- Ultrasonic ranging module (sonar, echo sounding)
- Radar distance measurement
- Laser rangefinder, lidar, time-of-flight camera

== See also ==
- Distance-based road exit numbers
- Linear referencing
- Meridian arc
- Milestone
- Rangefinder
- GPS,
  indirect by runtime measurement of electromagnetic waves in the GHz-range
- Hypsometer
- Interferometer
- Macrometer
- Odometer
- Position sensor
- Positioning system
- Standard ruler, in astronomy
- Tachymeter
- Taximeter, measure usually includes a time component as well
- Tellurometer
- Travelling microscope
- Angular measuring instrument
- Altimeter, height
- Distance measuring equipment (aviation)
- Ellipsometry#Imaging ellipsometry
- Frequency-modulated continuous-wave radar (FMCW)
- Length scale
- Low-energy electron microscopy
- Orders of magnitude (length)
- Pulse-Doppler radar
- Range ambiguity resolution
- Cosmic distance ladder
- Bradley A. Fiske
- Dazzle camouflage
- Depression range finder
- Fire-control system
- Range-finder painting
- Rangefinding telemeter
- Slant range
- Tacheometry
- Telemeter chronograph
- Tellurometer
