= SOCET SET =

Photogrammetry software

SOCET SET (GXP)
- Developer: BAE Systems
- Stable release: 5.6.0 / June 2011
- Operating system: Microsoft Windows, Sun Solaris
- Type: Photogrammetry
- License: Proprietary
- Website: www.geospatialexploitationproducts.com/content/

SOCET SET is a software application that performs functions related to photogrammetry. It is developed and published by BAE Systems. SOCET SET was among the first commercial digital photogrammetry software programs. Prior to the development of digital solutions, photogrammetry programs were primarily analog or custom systems built for government agencies.

== Features ==
SOCET SET inputs digital aerial photographs, taken in stereo (binocular) fashion, and from those photos it automatically generates a digital elevation model, digital feature (vector data), and orthorectified images (called orthophotos). The output data is used by customers to create digital maps, and for mission planning and targeting purposes.

The source images can come from film-based cameras, or digital cameras. The cameras can be mounted in an airplane, or on a satellite. A key requirement of the imagery is that there must be two or more overlapping images, taken from different vantage points. This "binocular" characteristic is what makes it mathematically possible to extract the 3-dimensional terrain and feature data from the imagery.

A key step, involving very complex least squares mathematics, is triangulation which determines exactly where the cameras were positioned when the photographs were taken. Photogrammetrists that contributed to SOCET SET's Triangulation include Scott Miller, Bingcai Zhang, John Dolloff, and Fidel Paderes. If the quality of the triangulation is poor, all subsequent data will have correspondingly poor positional accuracy.

The most recent major version, released in 2011, is version 5.6.

=== Stereo display ===
SOCET SET, like all high-end photogrammetry applications, requires a stereo display to be used to its fullest potential. Although SOCET SET can run and generate all its products on a computer with only a conventional display, a typical user will require a stereo display to view the digital data overlaid on the imagery. Interactive (manual) quality assurance requires this capability.

=== File formats ===
SOCET SET has the ability to read and write the following formats: VITec, Sun Raster, TIFF, TIFF 6.0 (Raster, Tiled, Tiled JPEG, and LZW), JFIF, NITF 2.0, NITF 2.0 JPEG, NITF 2.1, NITF 2.1 JPEG, ERDAS IMAGINE, JPEG 2000, Targa, COT, DGN, USGS DOQ, MrSID, Plain Raster.

SOCET SET has the ability to read terrain data formats, including: DTED, USGS DEM, ASCII (user-defined), LIDAR LAS, ArcGrid, SDTS, NED, GSI, GeoTIFF.

Vector formats supported include: DXF, Shapefile, ASCII (ArcGen), ASCII, TOPSCENE.

== Applications ==
SOCET SET, like some photogrammetry tools, is used for the following applications:

- Cartography (map making) – especially topographic maps
- Targeting (warfare)
- Mission planning
- Mission rehearsal
- Remote sensing
- Building a 3D model of the Earth's surface for computer simulation
- Astrophysics
- Conservation-restoration

About half of SOCET SET users are commercial, and half are government/military.

== History ==
Development started as a Research and Development project around 1989, with Jim Gambale as the sole developer. At the time, the parent corporation was GDE Systems (formerly a subsidiary of General Dynamics). The hardware platform was a PC running Interactive Unix.

After the prototype proved successful, a larger R&D effort was initiated in 1990, led by Herman Kading. One of the primary accomplishments of this effort was to migrate the product to UNIX Platforms, including Sun, SGI, HP, and IBM.

Technical knowledge was provided by Helava Inc, a company based in Detroit, Michigan that specialized in photogrammetry. Helava employees Scott Miller, Janis McArthur née Thiede, and Kurt de Venecia brought in-depth experience in the field.

Leadership of the project passed to Neal Olander around 1992, and after this time, SOCET SET (which before then was only sold to government customers) began to be distributed commercially. Around 1996, SOCET SET was migrated to the Microsoft Windows operating system, although the Unix system continued to be supported as well.

Technical skills were provided by Tom Dawson, Kurt Reindel, Dave Mayes, Jim Colgate, Bingcai Zhang and Dave Miller.

=== Future ===
Starting in 2005, SOCET SET photogrammetric functionality migrated to the next generation product, SOCET GXP (Geospatial eXploitation Product).

=== Meaning of SOCET SET ===
SOCET SET is an acronym that stands for SOftCopy Exploitation Toolkit. The phrase is a play on the actual tool socket set.

=== Release history ===
- v1.0 – 1991
- v2.0 – 1993
- v3.0 – 1995
- v4.0 – June 1997
- v4.1 – Sept 1998
- v4.2 – July 1999
- v4.3 – Sept 2000
- v4.4 – Dec 2001
- v5.0 – Sept 2003
- v5.1 – Apr 2004
- v5.2 – Nov 2004
- v5.3 – June 2006
- v5.4 – Summer 2007
- v5.4.1 – Jan 2008
- v5.5 – Jun 2009
- v5.6 – Jun 2011

== Alternatives ==
The chief competitor to SOCET SET is the Leica Photogrammetry Suite (a.k.a. LPS, owned by ERDAS), INPHO, PHOTOMOD and Intergraph, which are also leaders in the field of photogrammetry.

Other related applications that have some photogrammetry functionality include ArcGIS, ENVI, and ERDAS IMAGINE, all of which are primarily GIS or remote sensing applications.

== See also ==
- Photogrammetry
- Triangulation
- Orthophoto
- Binocular vision
- Reconnaissance
- Remote Sensing
- Imaging Spectroscopy
- Least squares

=== Related terms ===
- Image Processing
- GIS
- Topography
- Multispectral
