= Wild Heerbrugg =

Swiss optical instruments company

Wild (Heerbrugg)
- Industry: Surveying equipment
- Founded: Heerbrugg (SG), Switzerland (26 April 1921)
- Founder: Heinrich Wild, Jacob Schmidheiny, Robert Helbling
- Fate: Merged with Leica Geosystems
- Area served: Worldwide
- Products: Automatic levels, Theodolites

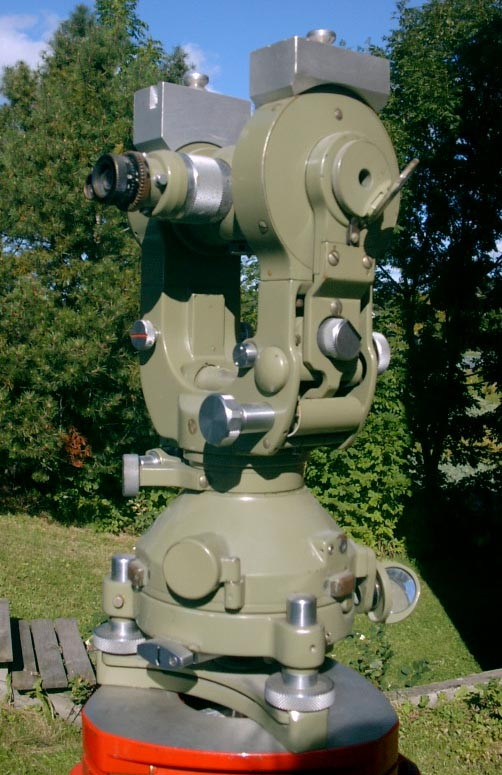
Wild T2 Theodolite

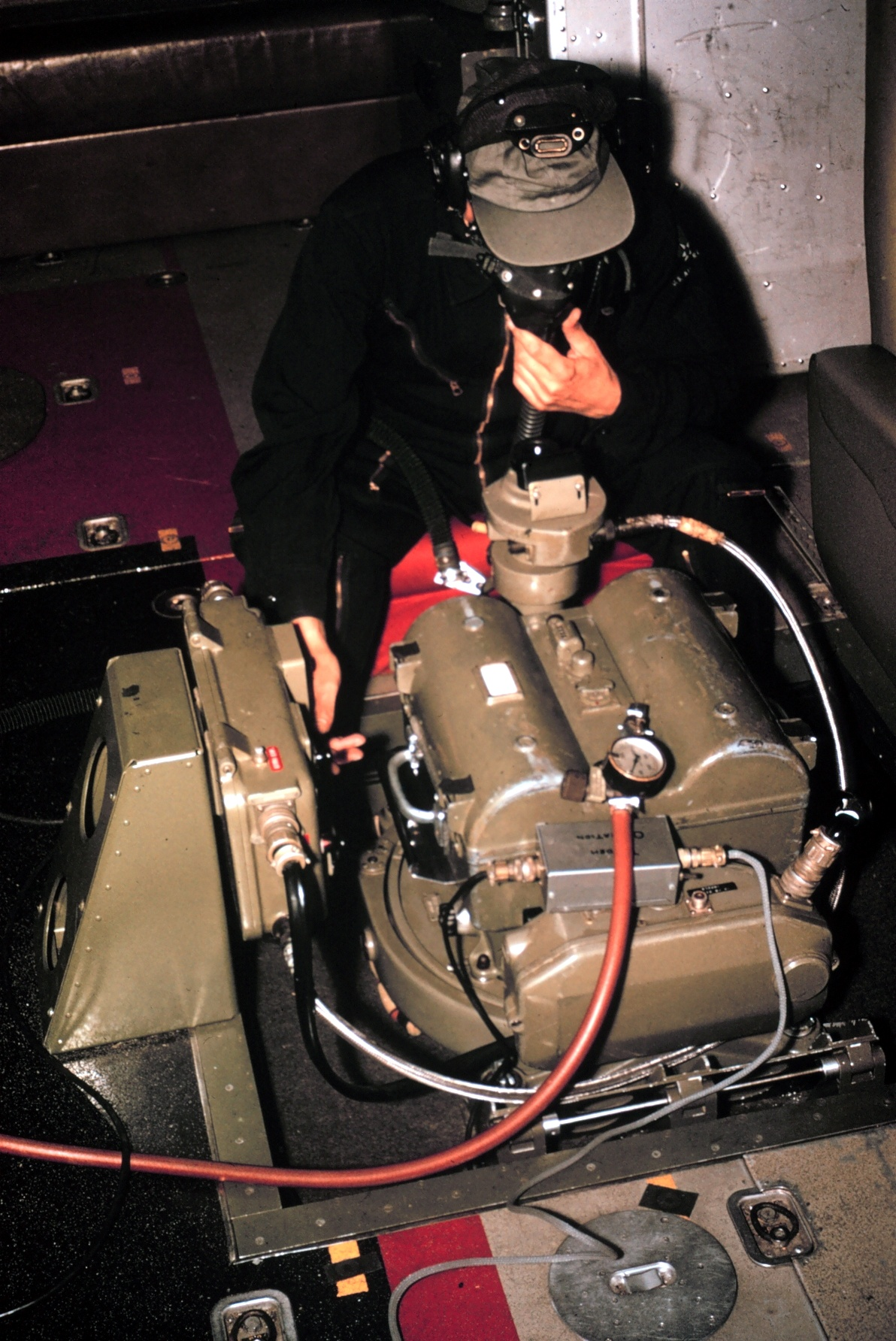
Aerial photographer in the unpressurized cabin of a NOAA de Havilland Buffalo breathing with the assistance of an oxygen mask, operating a Wild RC-8 camera

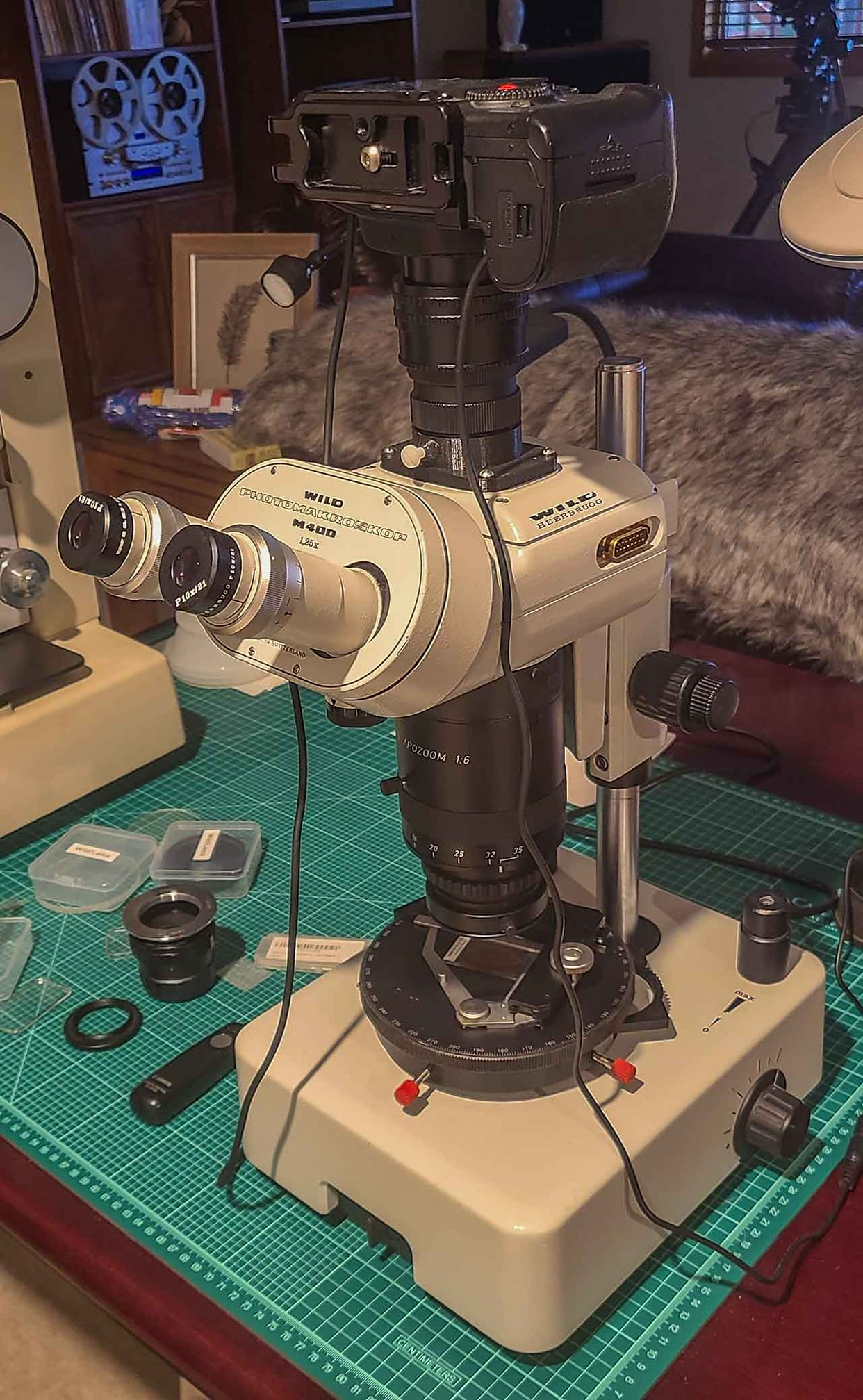
Wild Heerbrugg M400 macroscope (1970s-80s)

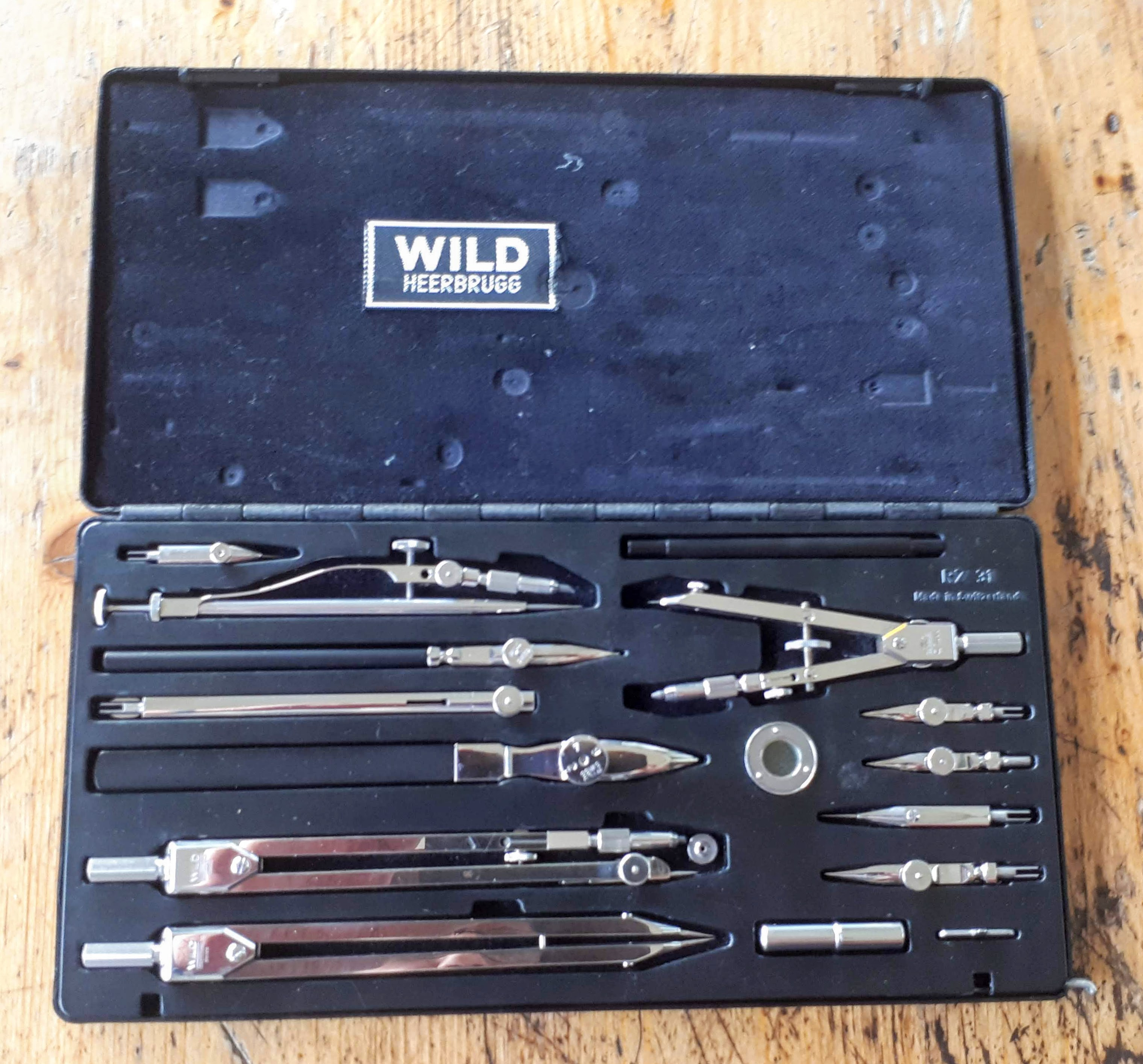
Wild Heerbrugg - Drawing set RZ31

The Wild (Heerbrugg) company (pronounced "vilt") was founded in 1921 in Switzerland. The company manufactured optical instruments, such as surveying instruments, microscopes and instruments for photogrammetry among others. The company changed its name several times, first being known as "Heinrich Wild, Werkstätte für Feinmechanik und Optik", then "Verkaufs-Aktiengesellschaft Heinrich Wild's Geodätische Instrumente", later "Wild Heerbrugg AG", later "Wild-Leitz". The company was linked with Leica in 1989, then it became part of Leica Holding B.V. Its subsidiary Leica Geosystems AG became part of the Swedish Hexagon AB Group of companies in 2005.

== History ==
On 26 April 1921 the company Heinrich Wild, Werkstätte für Feinmechanik und Optik was founded in Heerbrugg by three Swiss men; the surveyor and inventor Heinrich Wild from Glarus, the investor Jacob Schmidheiny from Balgach, and the geologist Dr. Robert Helbling from Flums.

Heinrich Wild (1877–1951), a leading designer of geodetic and astronomical instruments, was born in Switzerland and began his career as an apprentice surveyor. In 1908, having invented a military rangefinder and convinced Zeiss to manufacture it, Wild moved to Jena and became head of GEO, the new Zeiss branch responsible for surveying instruments. Wild returned to Switzerland after the First World War. In 1921, with the help of Swiss financiers, he established a Werkstätte für Feinmechanik und Optik in Heerbrugg, in the Rhine Valley. As the first major product, Wild developed the Theodolite Wild T2. Later models were launched when Wild already had left the company, still bearing his name, such as the theodolite WILD Heerbrugg T4. Another important new product engineered by Wild was an aerial camera, later called "Aviophot" for cartography.

In the early 1930s, having recognized that he was not cut out to be a factory manager, Wild moved to Zurich, severed his connections with the firm in Heerbrugg, and designed instruments for Kern & Co in Aarau. His old firm became Wild Heerbrugg in 1937. It merged with the optical firm of Ernst Leitz GmbH of Wetzlar in 1987. It also acquired a majority interest in Kern in 1988, was renamed Wild-Leitz AG in 1989. The combined company had about 8000 employees and revenues of approx. one billion Swiss Francs (CHF). Then, it became part of the Leica holding company in 1990.

Starting from 1996 the company was divided gradually again into smaller units. Thus 1996 the Leica Camera AG developed, in October 1997 the Leica Geosystems AG and on 1 April 1998 the Leica Microsystems AG. Leica Geosystems produced, in continuation of Wild Heerbrugg, the geodetic instruments and is the global market leader in this sector as part of the new parent company Hexagon AB.

The brand name "Wild Heerbrugg" is still in use for stereo microscopes and precision level measuring such as the WILD Heerbrugg N3 Level.

== See also ==
- Leica
