= Orthophoto =

Geometrically corrected aerial photograph

Orthographic views project at a right angle to the datum plane. Perspective views project from the surface onto the datum plane from a fixed location.

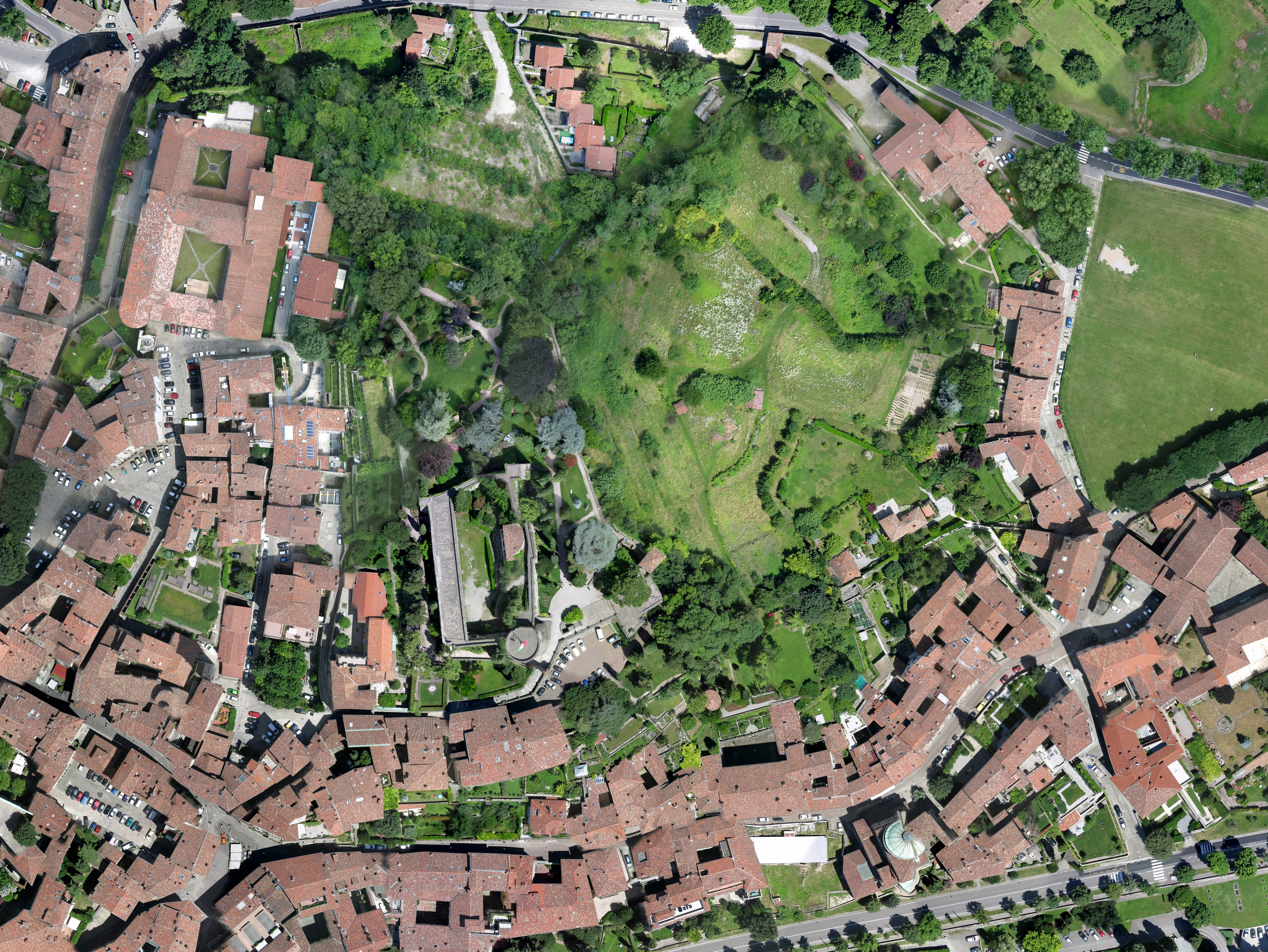
Aerophotogrammetry, orthophoto from drone, Città Alta, Bergamo, Italy

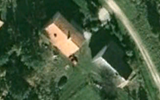
This photo is properly projected on elevation model, yet on a single building scale, a small tilt is noticeable. This is an orthophoto, but not a true orthophoto (not all vertical features are reprojected).

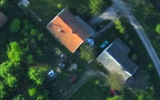
This photo is assembled from several overlapping photos from UAV, completely removing any residual tilt of the buildings. This is a true orthophoto.

An orthophoto, orthophotograph, orthoimage or orthoimagery is an aerial photograph or satellite imagery geometrically corrected ("orthorectified") such that the scale is uniform: the photo or image follows a given map projection. Unlike an uncorrected aerial photograph, an orthophoto can be used to measure true distances, because it is an accurate representation of the Earth's surface, having been adjusted for topographic relief, lens distortion, and camera tilt.

Orthophotographs are commonly used in geographic information systems (GIS) as a "map accurate" background image. An orthorectified image differs from rubber sheeted rectifications as the latter may accurately locate a number of points on each image but stretch the area between so scale may not be uniform across the image. A digital elevation model (DEM) or topographic map is required to create an orthophoto, as distortions in the image due to the varying distance between the camera/sensor and different points on the ground need to be corrected. An orthoimage and a "rubber sheeted" image can both be said to have been georeferenced; however, the overall accuracy of the rectification varies. Software can display the orthophoto and allow an operator to digitize or place linework, text annotations or geographic symbols (such as hospitals, schools, and fire stations). Some software can process the orthophoto and produce the linework automatically.

Production of orthophotos was historically achieved using opto-mechanical devices.

The orthorectification is not always perfect and has side effects especially for the geometry of high-rise constructions. When using the top-most digital surface model (DSM), instead of the bottom DTM, the resulting product is called a true orthophoto.

== Orthophotomosaic and orthophotomap ==
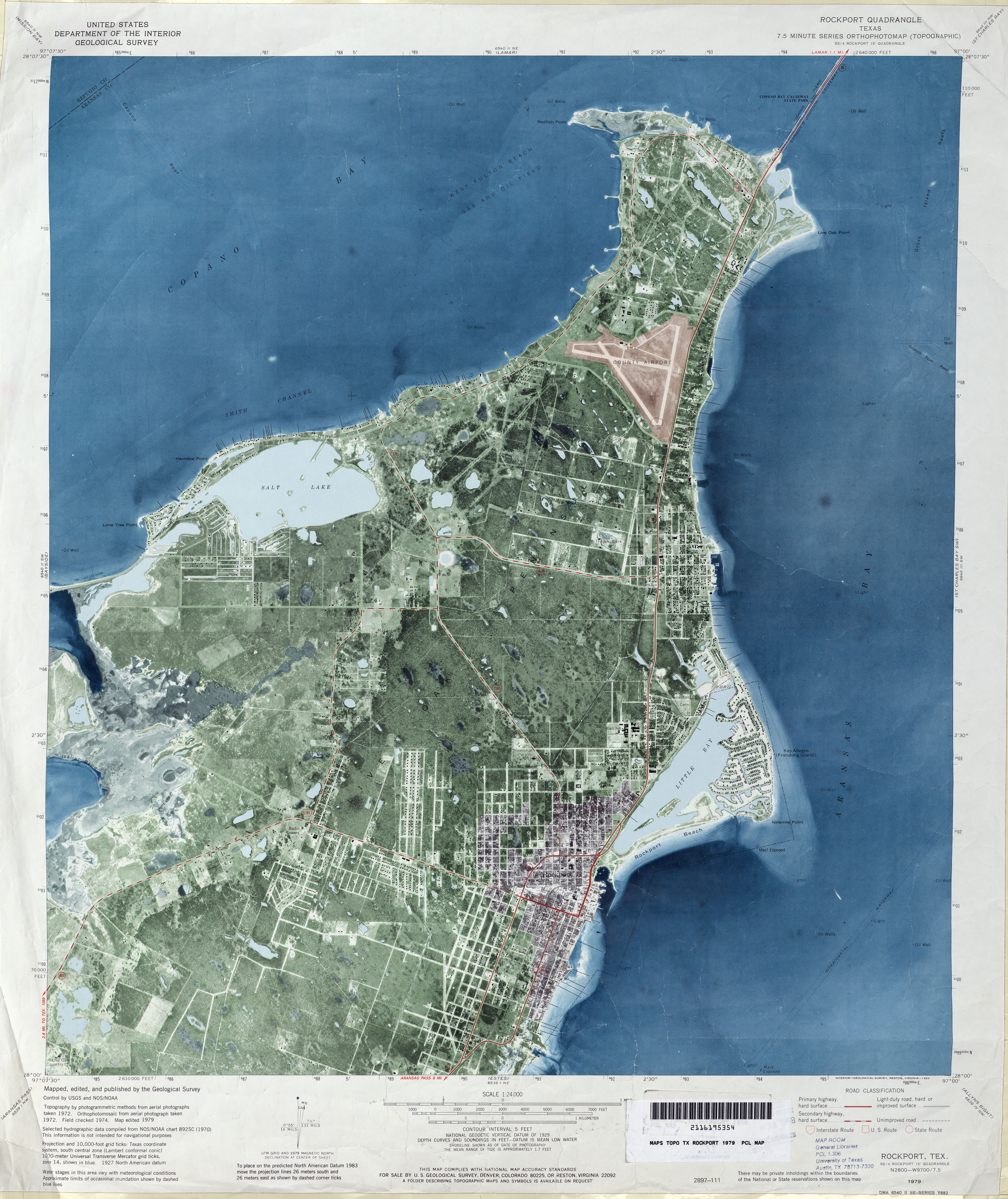
Orthophotomap of Rockport, Texas. The orthophotomap contains additional roads, terrain elevation and bathymetry layers.

Orthophotomap of Oviedo city center, Spain

An orthophotomosaic is a raster image mosaic made by merging or stitching orthophotos. The aerial or satellite photographs have been transformed to correct for perspective so that they appear to have been taken from vertically above at an infinite distance. Google Earth images are of this type.

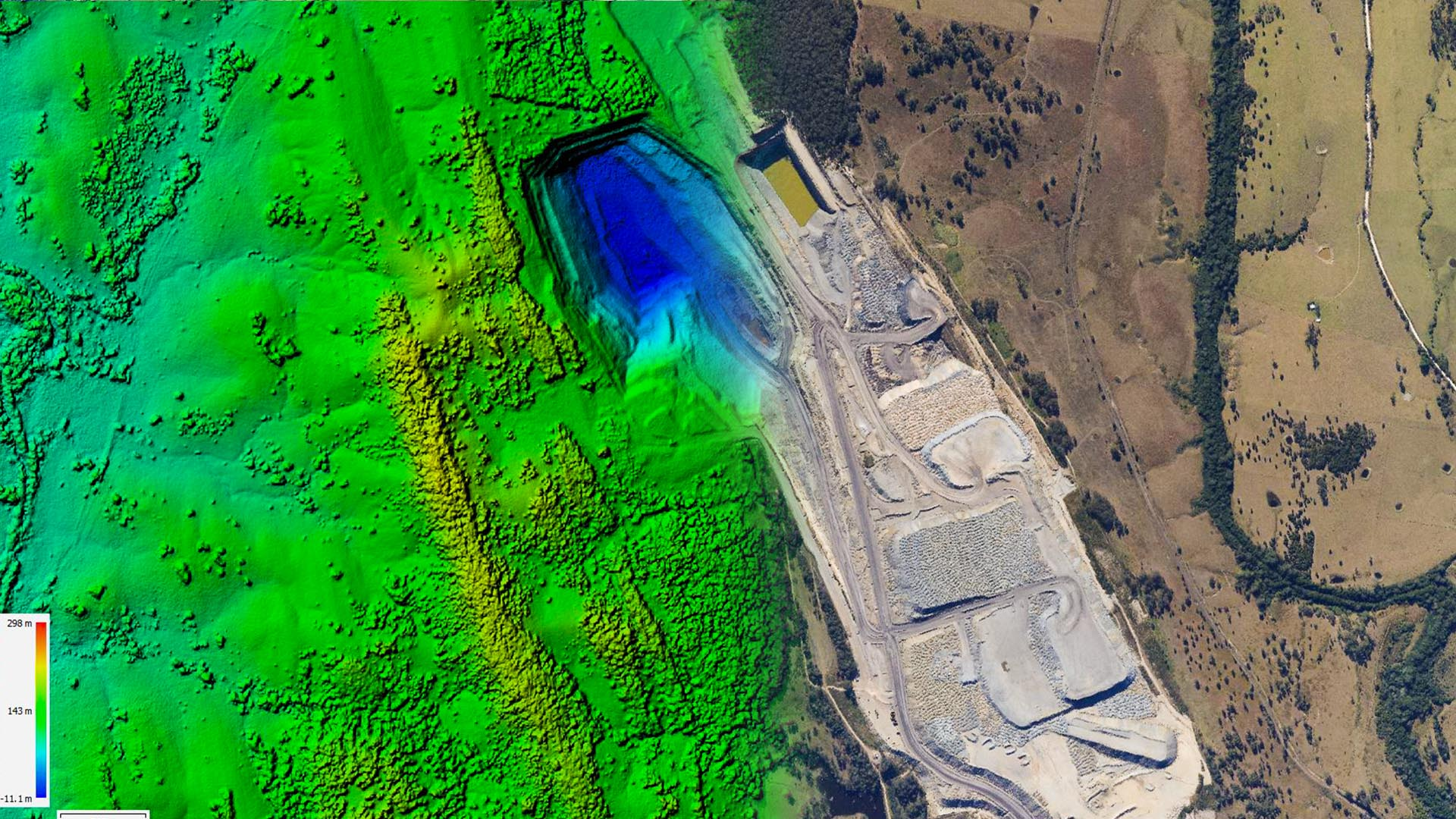
Aerial orthorectified image of a mine for volumetric measurements in stock pile reporting

The document (digital or paper) representing an orthophotomosaic with additional marginal information like a title, north arrow, scale bar and cartographical information is called an orthophotomap or image map. Often these maps show additional point, line or polygon layers (like a traditional map) on top of the orthophotomosaic. A similar document, mostly used for disaster relief, is called a spatiomap.

== See also ==
- Digital orthophoto quadrangle (DOQ) and digital orthophoto quarter quadrangle (DOQQ)
- GRASS GIS (i.ortho.photo module)
- IMAGINE Photogrammetry, formerly Leica Photogrammetry Suite
- Photogrammetry
- Photomapping
- Rational polynomial coefficient
- SOCET SET
- TopoFlight
- United States Geological Survey
