= Leica Microsystems =

Microscope manufacturing company in Germany

Coordinates: 50°33′07″N 08°29′52″E

- Type: Subsidiary GmbH
- Industry: Industrial manufacturing
- Founded: Germany (1997)
- Headquarters: Wetzlar, Germany
- Key people: Dr. Annette Rinck (President),
- Products: Microscopes
- Revenue: ▲~$1 billion (2008)
- Parent: Danaher
- Website: www.leica-microsystems.com

Leica Microsystems GmbH is a German microscope manufacturing company. It is a manufacturer of optical microscopes, equipment for the preparation of microscopic specimens and related products. There are ten plants in eight countries with distribution partners in over 100 countries. Leica Microsystems emerged in 1997 out of a 1990 merger between Wild-Leitz, headquartered in Heerbrugg Switzerland, and Cambridge Instruments of Cambridge England. The merger of those two umbrella companies created an alliance of the following 8 individual manufacturers of scientific instruments. American Optical Scientific Products, Carl Reichert Optische Werke AG, R.Jung, Bausch and Lomb Optical Scientific Products Division, Cambridge Instruments, E.Leitz Wetzlar, Kern & Co., and Wild Heerbrugg AG, bringing much-needed modernization and a broader degree of expertise to the newly created entity called Leica Holding B.V. group. In 1997 the name was changed to Leica Microsystems and is a wholly owned entity of Danaher Corporation since July 2005. Danaher is an American global conglomerate.

== Details ==
The company employed over 4,000 workers and had a $1 billion turnover in 2008. It is headquartered in Wetzlar, Germany, and represented in over 100 other countries.

The company manufactures products for applications requiring microscopic imaging, measurement and analysis. It also offers system solutions in the areas of Life Science including biotechnology and medicine, as well as the science of raw materials and industrial quality assurance.

Product categories include Virtual microscopes, Light microscopes, products for Confocal Microscopy, Surgical Microscopes, Stereo Microscopes & Macroscopes, Digital microscopes, Microscope Software, Microscope Cameras, Electron microscope Sample Preparation Equipment

In the field of high resolution optical microscopy they produce commercial versions of the STED microscope offering sub-diffraction resolution. In 2007 they launched the TCS STED which operates at a resolution <100 nm. In 2009 they launched the TCS STED CW using a CW laser light source where a resolution <80 nm can be achieved.

On 29 September 2011 Leica Microsystems and TrueVision 3D Surgical announced their intention to jointly produce products for ophthalmology and neurosurgery under the Leica brand.

== See also ==
- Heinrich Wild
- Wild Heerbrugg
