= Leica Geosystems =

Swiss geographical company

- Type: part of Hexagon AB
- Industry: Surveying & Engineering; Geographic Information Systems (GIS); High Precision Measurement instruments
- Founded: Heerbrugg, Switzerland (1921)
- Headquarters: Heerbrugg, Canton of St. Gallen, Switzerland
- Website: www.leica-geosystems.com

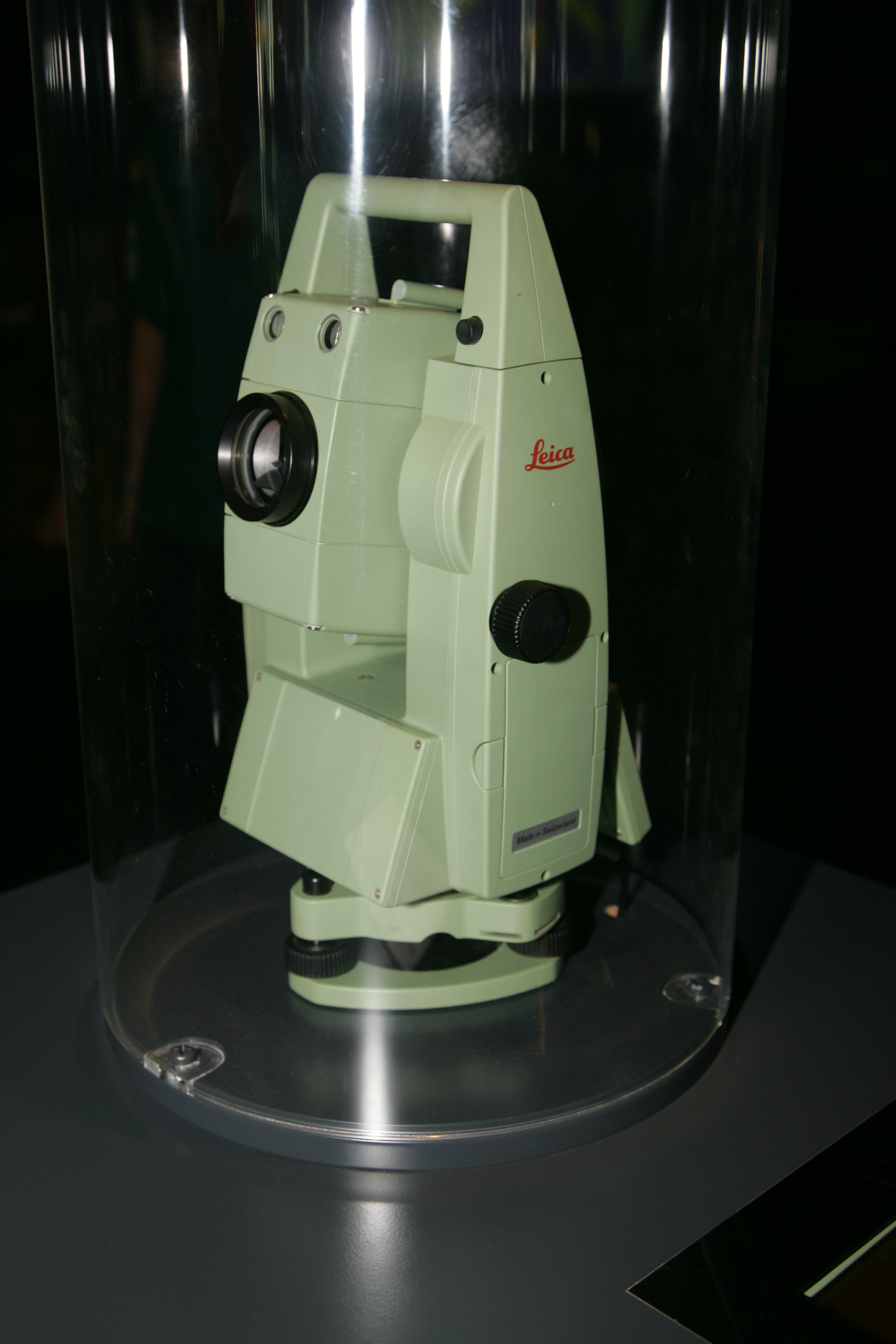
Total station used in surveying

Leica Geosystems (formerly known as Wild Heerbrugg or just Wild) based in eastern Switzerland produces products and systems for surveying and geographical measurement (geomatics). Its products employ a variety of technologies including GPS satellite navigation and laser rangefinders to enable users to model existing structures, terrains in computer based systems to high accuracies, often under 1 cm.

== History ==
The brand Leica, better known for Leica Cameras, was formed on 2 April 1990 after the merger of several companies. In 2005, the company was acquired by Hexagon AB. Leica was listed on the Swiss stock exchange until the 7 August 2006 which saw the cancellation of all publicly held registered shares in Leica Geosystems Holdings Ltd and delisting of all listed registered shares of a par value of CHF 50.

Leica Geosystems Geospatial Imaging is a Strategic Member in the Open Geospatial Consortium since 2008. Strategic Membership is the highest level of membership in the OGC. Strategic Members provide significant resources to support OGC objectives in the form of funding for program initiatives and staff resources inserted into the OGC process.

Heinrich Wild (1877–1951) of Glarus, Switzerland, a leading designer of geodetic and astronomical instruments, began his career as an apprentice surveyor. In 1908, having invented a military rangefinder and convinced Zeiss to manufacture it, Wild moved to the city of Jena and became head of the new Zeiss branch responsible for surveying instruments, GEO.

Wild returned to Switzerland after the First World War. On 26 April 1921, with Colonel Jacob Schmidheiny of Balgach and geologist Robert Helbling of Flums and with the help of Swiss financiers, he founded WILD Heerbrugg in Heerbrugg in the Alpine Rhine Valley. In the early 1930s, having recognized that he was not cut out to be a factory manager, Wild moved to Zürich, severed his connections with the firm in Heerbrugg, and designed instruments for Kern & Co in Aarau. His old firm became Wild Heerbrugg in 1937.

It merged with the optical firm of Ernst Leitz of Wetzlar in 1987, acquired a majority interest in Kern in 1988, was renamed Wild Leitz AG in 1989, and became part of the Leica holding company in 1990. Starting in 1996, the company was divided gradually into smaller units. Thus in 1996, Leica Camera AG was founded, followed in October 1997 by Leica Geosystems AG, and on 1 April 1998 by Leica Microsystems AG.

These three companies are independent public companies. Leica Geosystems produces, in continuation of Wild Heerbrugg, the geodetic instruments and is the global market leader in this section. The main customers of Leica Geosystems are surveyors, manufacturers and GIS companies.

In 2000 Leica Geosystems purchased Cyra Technologies, maker of the Cyrax laser 3D scanner line. In April 2001, Leica Geosystems acquired ERDAS, Inc., a remote sensing software firm, and LH Systems, a photogrammetric software firm (see IMAGINE Photogrammetry). These two companies were merged into software company, ERDAS, Inc. ERDAS purchased Acquis, ER Mapper and IONIC in 2007. This expanded further ERDAS in the remote sensing market, let it enter the enterprise topological GIS market, and expanded its footprint in the image web serving and image enterprise market.

The Swedish company Hexagon AB purchased Leica Geosystems in late 2005.

In October 2010, Intergraph was acquired by Hexagon AB. As part of the Hexagon acquisition, Hexagon moved ERDAS from under Leica Geosystems to Intergraph, and Z/I Imaging airborne imaging sensors from under Intergraph to Leica Geosystems.

In September 2011, Leica Geosystems Mining announced an exclusive industry partnership with Locata Corporation to provide the mining industry with the world’s only high precision radio positioning system that is not reliant on GPS.

== Leica DISTO ==
The Leica DISTO is a line of advanced laser distance measuring devices invented by Leica Geosystems. The DISTO technology revolutionized handheld measurement as it replaced traditional tape measures with accurate laser-based technology with digital functionality.

The Leica DISTO was launched in 1993 featuring a technology that measured distance by shooting a pulse at a distant object and then measured the time taken for the pulse to be reflected back. It was launched at the Batimat show in Paris and was demonstrated as a handheld device the size of a brick and weighed about two pounds. The original device launched could measure 100 meters with a 1.8-mm accuracy. The DISTO was awarded the Silver Batimat Innovation Medal.

Leica DISTO devices have become widely used in surveying, construction, infrastructure, mining, mapping, and geospatial industries. The devices also feature multi-functional modes for myriad purposes.

These devices utilize Class II lasers and incorporate tilt sensors, digital pointfinders, and smart horizontal modes to ensure reliable measurements even in challenging environments. The inclusion of gesture-triggered readings in newer models like the D5 and X6 further enhances usability by minimizing device movement during measurement. In these models, users simply interrupt the laser beam with their hands to trigger measurements, eliminating the risk of moving the device when pressing a button. DISTO devices also support real-time drawing and CAD export. Advanced models support Point-to-Point (P2P) measurement, enabling users to capture 3D coordinates from a single location.
