= IMAGINE Photogrammetry =

Photogrammetry software

IMAGINE Photogrammetry (formerly Leica Photogrammetry Suite – LPS) is a software application for performing photogrammetric operations on imagery and extracting information from imagery. IMAGINE Photogrammetry is a leading commercial photogrammetry application that is used by numerous national mapping agencies, regional mapping authorities, various DOTs, as well as commercial mapping firms. Aside from commercial and government applications, IMAGINE Photogrammetry is widely used in academic research. Research areas include landslide monitoring, cultural heritage studies, and more.

== Capabilities ==
IMAGINE Photogrammetry is generally used for the processing of raw imagery through to the creation of geospatial data products such as digital terrain models, 3D features, and digital orthophotos. There are a number of approaches for photogrammetric applications; imagery may come from remote sensing satellites, airborne cameras (film or digital), or ground-based cameras. In the context of airborne film cameras, the workflow would involve scanning the imagery (creating a digital version of the film imagery), solving the interior orientation parameters, and triangulating the images. Once the images are triangulated, image pairs may be viewed in stereo and 3D measurements can be made. The system can automatically generate digital terrain models, which can be reviewed and edited in stereo. Once an accurate 3D surface has been derived, triangulated images may be orthorectified. In addition to this workflow, IMAGINE Photogrammetry supports 3D feature extraction, radiometric adjustment, and a number of additional digital image processing capabilities available from ERDAS IMAGINE, which is included with IMAGINE Photogrammetry.

== Other workflows ==
In addition to the workflows above, IMAGINE Photogrammetry also supports the following applications:

- Satellite Photogrammetry
- Direct Georeferencing: ground control points (GCPs) are not used because the aircraft is equipped with Airborne GPS and IMU systems. This is an emerging workflow that is suitable for remote area mapping.
- Close-Range Photogrammetry

== History ==
While the initial release of IMAGINE Photogrammetry (called "Leica Photogrammetry Suite 8.7") was in late 2003, it was a combination of new technology as well as software previously developed by ERDAS (which was acquired by Leica Geosystems in 2003). The product evolution is as follows:

- 1991 - "Digital Ortho" in ERDAS 7.5
- 1993 - OrthoMAX
- 1994 - Warptool & Mosaictool in IMAGINE 8.2
- 1999 - OrthoBASE first release in IMAGINE 8.3.1
- 2000 - Stereo Analyst 1.0 (module for stereo feature extraction)
- 2001 - OrthoBASE Pro (module for automated terrain extraction)
- 2003 - Leica Photogrammetry Suite 8.7",
- 2004 - Leica Photogrammetry Suite 8.7 Service Pack 1 (incorporates add-on modules of ORIMA and PRO600, which were initially developed for use with SOCET SET)
- 2005 - Leica Photogrammetry Suite 8.7 Service Packs 2 and 3 ([Leica Geosystems] ADS40 sensor support, automated point measurement improvements)
- 2005 - Leica Photogrammetry Suite 9.0 (new module for image mosaicking, called MosaicPro)
- 2006 - Leica Photogrammetry Suite 9.1 (new TIN format: LTF, terrain split and merge improvements)
- 2008 - Leica Photogrammetry Suite 9.2 (ATE improvements, new sensor models, enhanced mosaicking)
- 2008 - With the re-branding of "Leica Geosystems Geospatial Imaging" to "ERDAS", the "Leica Photogrammetry Suite" name was converted to an acronym, "LPS".
- 2008 - LPS 9.3 (PRO600 Fundamentals released)
- 2010 - LPS 2010 released
- 2010 - LPS 2010 v10.1 released (new algorithm eATE release, as follow up to ATE)
- 2010 - LPS 2011 released (improvements to MosaicPro, Terrain Prep Tool and more)
- 2012 - LPS 2013 released
- 2014 - IMAGINE Photogrammetry (New package, New abilities like SGM)

== See also ==
- Aerial Photography
- Digital Surface Model
- ERDAS IMAGINE
- Leica Geosystems
- Orthophoto
- Photogrammetry
- Remote Sensing
- Satellite imagery
- Stereoplotter
- Stereoscopy
- Triangulation
