= TopoFlight =

Flight planning software

TopoFlight is a three-dimensional flight planning software for photogrammetric flights.

Originally conceived by a team of experts in the mapping industry, it has been in use since 2003. The program is used to facilitate the planning of flight lines with the help of a Digital Terrain Model (DTM), to document the flight plan and transfer it into the flight management system of the camera (for instance SoftNav, TrackAir, ASCOT or CCNS4), to calculate the costs of photogrammetric flight and subsequent photogrammetric products with the aid of Microsoft Excel as well as flight parameters, and to complete the post checking of a flight (flying height, length overlap, and side lap). Coordinates that have been calculated can be exported to be used during flight. TopoFlight is able to work with frame, line, and LIDAR sensors.

As of 2017 the software is at version 10.5.3.

== History from 2003–2015 ==
- Released in April 2015

The TopoFlight Mission Planner has been upgraded to version 9.5. TopoFlight does use the edge of the image to calculate side overlap and length overlap. It actually calculates over the whole covered area by photos. It is easier now to plan the flights with cameras, sensors and LiDAR systems. Maps can be directly downloaded from Google into TopoFlight with user selectable resolution.

Due to a change in Google’s API, the Google Maps Tool in the TopoFlight Program had to be adapted. Improvements, like enhanced calculation of side lap, importing from TIFF DTM, importing of XYZOPK files for quality control and many other features have been completed. Large flight plans in fairly flat areas can be computed much faster now by switching OFF the ‘Precise Calculation' option.

Version 7

- Released in May 2009
- In 2008 at the International Congress on Geomatic and Surveying Engineering in Valencia, Spain, Professor Jorge Delgado (specializing in cartographic engineering, geodesy and photogrammetry) from the University of Jaen in Spain as well as Klaus Budmiger (of Flotron AG) et al. presented an oral presentation concerning the TopoFlight flight planning system (see contribution 22 at the International Congress on Geomatic and Surveying Engineering)

Version 6

- Version 6 moved from a 32 bit to a 64 bit system. Version 6 Beta was released for testing in January 2008. It was available to existing users for testing in February. By April of that year, it was still not fully operational. There were issues with the latitude and longitude with respect to measurements in feet that had to be corrected. Eventually v.6 would allow for constant latitude calculations as well as: Google Earth export, more data formats, new projection management, faster calculation of overlap between strips, use of .prj files, LIDAR flight planning, automatic checking over the internet if a new version is available, and downloading it, licensing with USB hardlocks (Aladdin), and coordinate grid display. By May 2008 the full version was operational and being distributed.

Version 5

- 2007 saw the advent of Version 5 of TopoFlight. It allowed for projections to be made using the Universal Transverse Mercator coordinate system (UTM). DTM importing functions began to be addressed with this version as it was not possible to import DEM data without reprojecting it as DTM first. Version 5 could only plan in projected coordinates but could output the flight lines and image centers to lat/long. Input required a text file with projected coordinates (like UTM). These issues were going to be changed for v.6.
- Another issue that was encountered in v. 5 that needed to be addressed was the impossibility to perform flight planning by filling a "horseshoe shaped" area of interest. The break line tool had to be used line per line to modify the new lines to the desired area of interest manually. After this, an enumeration could be performed.

Version 4

- Version 4 was the first version available for sale to the public.

Version 1

- In 2003 the first version of TopoFlight was created mainly for internal use by specialized, technical professionals.

== File formats ==
TopoFlight works with multiple layers. The generated flight plans are stored in the widely used "shape format" (ESRI/ARC VIEW).

Additional maps can be attached as reference files. These maps include:

- Topographic maps
- Project area
- Existing control points
- Flight navigation maps

The reference files can be in the following formats:

- SHAPE from ESRI
- DXF from AutoCAD
- DGN from Mirostation
- TIFF with tfw- header for all raster files

== Features ==
Best fit flying height – Calculation of the best flying height to achieve the desired image scale as well as minimum and maximum image scales for given flying height.

Coordinate transformations – Transformation of the coordinates from the local grid to another system (such as WGS84).

Calculation of image centers – calculation of coordinates of each image with image scales and overlap.

Calculation of the effective covered area by the images of each strip

Area of side lap – Calculation of the side lap between two neighboring flight lines.

Calculation of costs – Calculation of costs of flight and photogrammetric products which can be transferred into Excel. Custom forms can be later defined.

List of coordinates – Transfer of the flight parameters to Excel. Custom forms can later be defined.

Ground control points – The coordinates of existing ground control points can be imported and annotated. They can also be placed with a mouse click to show the surveyor where to paint and measure a new ground control point.

Exporting the flight plan – The plot can be exported either through SHAPE files, DXF format, or in TIFF format with a TFW header file.

Transfer to flight management system – coordinates can be exported to ASCOT, CCNS, or TrackAir.

Check overlap for aerial triangulation – Check if the minimal overlap is achieved over the whole strip area.

Create image indexes – The coordinates of image centers, stored in a text file can be read by TopoFlight.

== Users ==
TopoFlight is currently in use in 19 countries including the United States, Germany, Brazil, Mexico, Canada, Austria, Italy and others.

== See also ==
- Aerial photography
- Aerial survey
- Orthophoto
- Photogrammetry
- Photomapping
- Remote Sensing
- Topography
