= Spatiomap =

Document similar to a map

A spatiomap is a document similar to a map, but based on an orthophoto. Often, some annotations are added to the orthophoto. Similar to normal maps, can display a north arrow, a scale bar and cartographical information like the used projection. Spatiomaps are useful when other reliable source are missing for a certain area and/or when a map must be produced in very short time (e.g. for disaster management). Spatiomaps are frequently used during disaster relief.

An image map or orthophotomap is a similar document, but is mostly regarded as an orthophotomosaic with some points, lines or polygon layers of a traditional map drawn over the orthophoto. An image map resembles a standard general purpose map but adds the use of an orthophotomosaic as a background.
