= Macrometer =

A macrometer is an instrument for measuring the size and distance of distant objects. Distant in this sense means a length that can not be readily measured by a calibrated length. The optical version of this instrument used two mirrors on a common sextant. By aligning the object on the mirrors using a precise vernier, the position of the mirrors could be used to compute the range to the object. The distance and the angular size of the object would then yield the actual size.

== See also ==
- Rangefinder
- Theodolite
