= Erasmus Habermehl =

German watchmaker

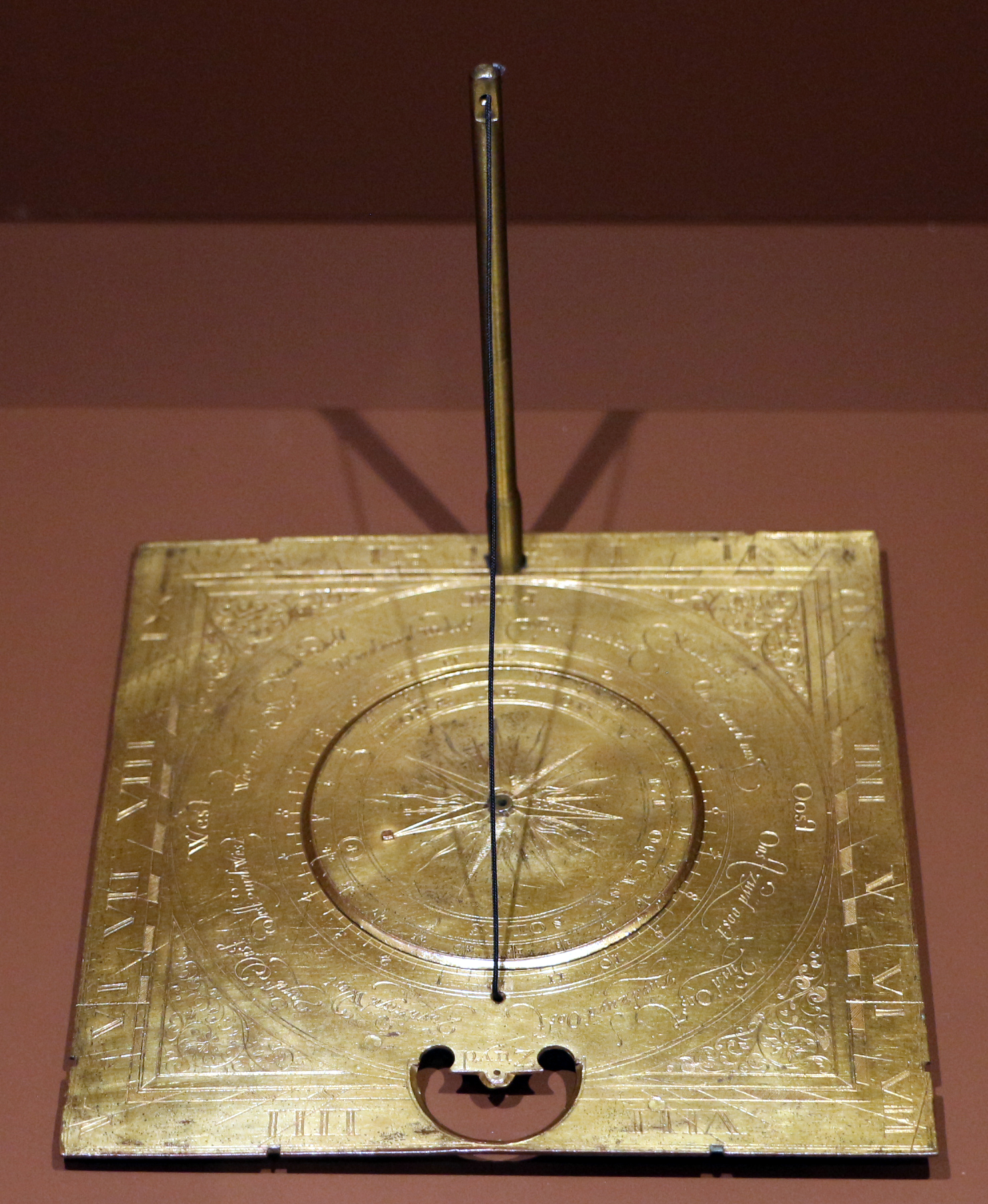
Meridiane, 1580 ca.

Erasmus Habermehl, also Erasmus Habermel (ca. 1538 – 15 November 1606 in Prague) was a major watchmaker and maker of astronomical and geodetical instruments, who last worked as a court instrument maker at the court of Emperor Rudolf II. in Prague.

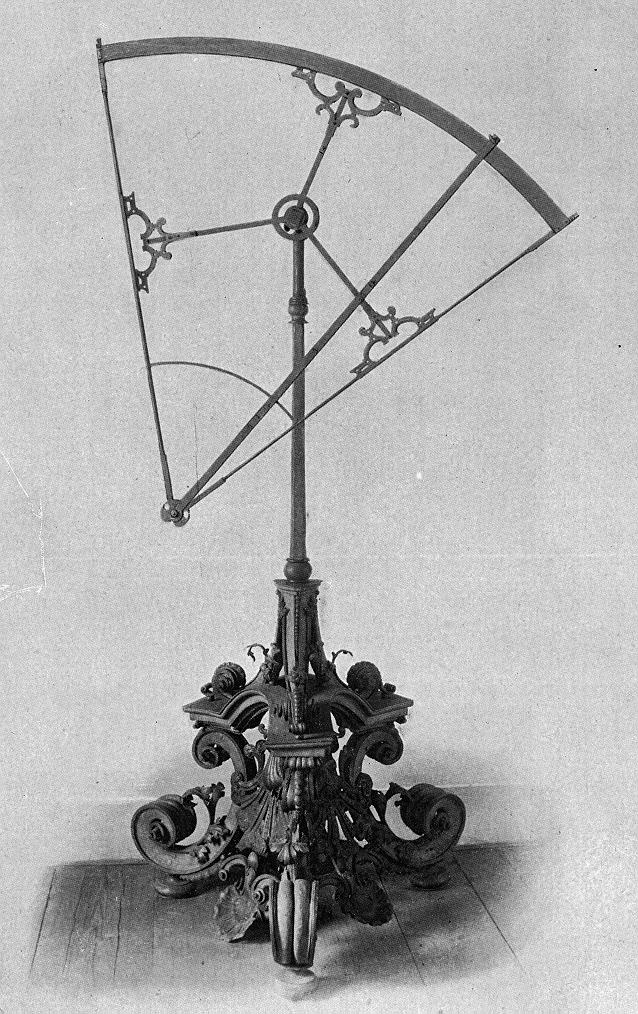
Habermehls Sextant in National Technical Museum (Prague)

He probably originated in southern Germany and probably reached Prague via Nuremberg, the centre of watchmaking art at the time. A brass box signed "Erasmus Habermel Pragae 1576" is considered his earliest known work. He married a Susanna Solis there in 1593 or 1594. In the same year he was appointed "Kay: Mt: Astronomischer und Geometrischer Instrumentmacher". He received commissions from Tycho Brahe and Francesco Padua di Forli, the personal physician (and at the same time alchimist) of the emperor.

In addition to their outstanding technical precision, his instruments were at the same time artistic, objects of the highest order designed in the style of the Renaissance. František Martin Pelcl reported 1782 in the Illustrations of Bohemian and Moravian scholars and artists together with short news about their life and work of instruments at the imperial court in Prague: "Of Habermel, a Bohemian mechanicus, are here still present 1) – Tycho Brahe's sextant. 2) – some sundials. 3) Some astrolabes, where the former magnetic declination for which in 1558 four pieces decreases quite exactly 10° to the east -[...]" (141 and 142).

== Honours ==
Habermehl Rock in Antarctica is named after Erasmus Habermehl.
