= Kern & Co. =

Former Swiss instrument manufacturer

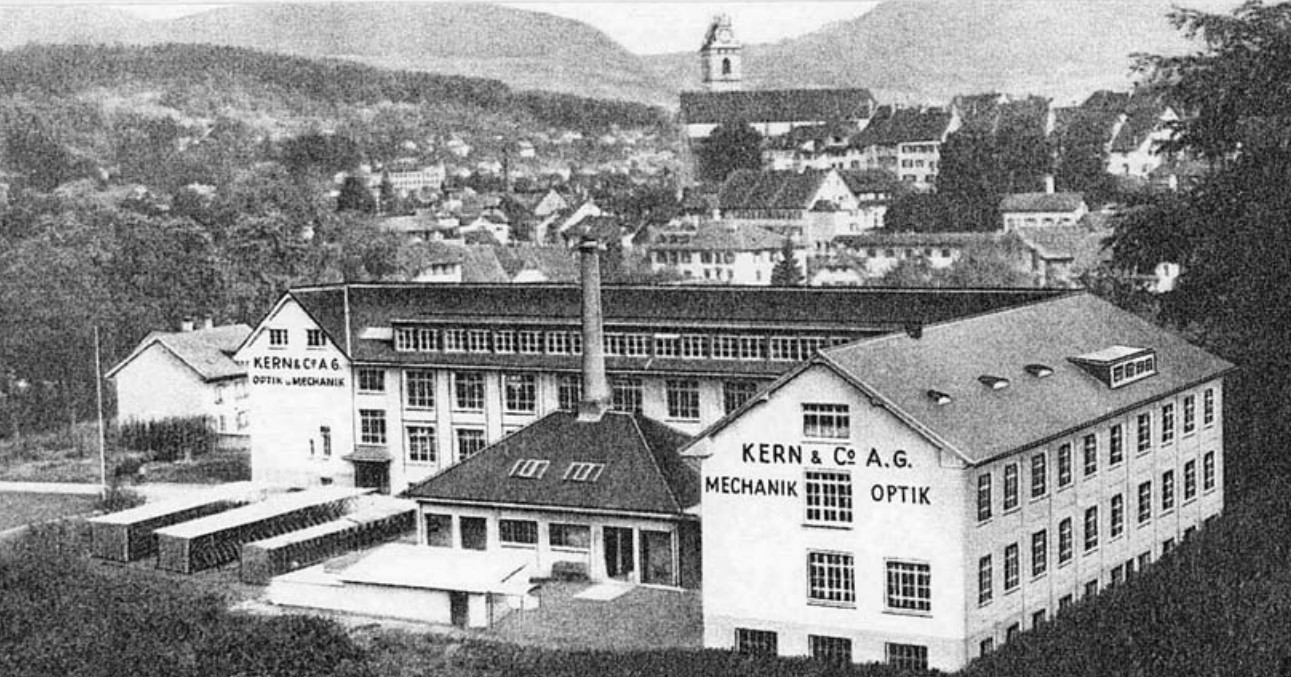
- The factory at Aarau-Schachen in 1920
- Industry: Precision engineering
- Founded: 1819
- Founder: Jakob Kern
- Defunct: 1991
- Fate: Sold to Wild-Leitz (1988); renamed Leica Aarau (1990); closed (1991)
- Headquarters: Aarau, Switzerland
- Products: Surveying instruments; photogrammetric equipment; optical equipment; drawing instruments
- Revenue: c. CHF 70 million (1990)
- Number of employees: 520 (1991)

Kern & Co. was a Swiss manufacturer of surveying, photogrammetric and optical instruments and of drawing instruments, based in Aarau. Jakob Kern founded it in 1819 as a workshop for drawing sets and precision instruments. It became a joint-stock company in 1914 and expanded abroad after 1945. In 1988 it was sold to its competitor Wild-Leitz; renamed Leica Aarau in 1990, it was closed in 1991.

== History ==
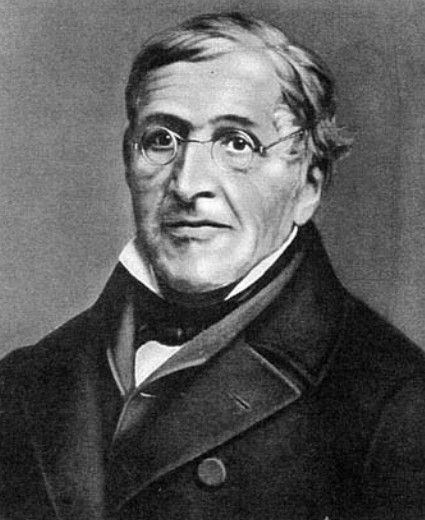
Jakob Kern, the founder

Jakob Kern founded the company in Aarau in 1819 as a workshop for drawing sets (Reisszeuge) and precision mechanical instruments. In 1914 it was converted into a joint-stock company, Kern & Cie. AG. In 1920 it set up the manufacture of optics and moved from individual craft production to series production. After 1945 it expanded to the United States, Canada, Brazil and Denmark. Its five product segments were optical-mechanical and electronic surveying instruments, photogrammetric and optical equipment, and drawing instruments.

In the 1980s the company introduced short-time work and gave up the manufacture of drawing sets, which had become unprofitable. In 1987 Peter Kern, the chairman of the executive board and the last representative of the founding family, resigned. In 1988 the firm was sold to its competitor Wild-Leitz. It was renamed Leica Aarau in 1990 and closed for economic reasons in 1991.

The workforce numbered 42 in 1857, 148 in 1874, 120 in 1915, 500 in 1944, 1,150 in 1983, and 520 in 1991. Sales amounted to about 70 million francs in 1990.

== Bibliography ==
- P. Vogel, "Das Lebenswerk Jakob Kerns", in Aarauer Neujahrsblätter, 54, 1980, 3–34
- R. Mäder, "Kern Aarau", in Aarauer Neujahrsblätter, 66, 1992, 24–36
