= Stoss =

Stoss (Stoß), a German word meaning "shock" or "impact", may refer to:

- Stoss (geography), a term describing the side of a landform that faces an advancing glacier
- Stoss Pass, in Switzerland
- Stoss railway station, in Gais, Switzerland
- 6106 Stoss, a main-belt asteroid

== People ==
- Ferdinand Stoss, United States Air Force major general
- Franz Stoss (1909–1995), Austrian actor
- Richard Stöss (born 1944), German political scientist
- Sebastian Stoss (born 1986), Austrian swimmer
- Veit Stoss (before 1450–1533), German sculptor

== See also ==
- Stoß (disambiguation)
- Pavao Štoos (1806–1862), Croatian poet, priest, and revivalist
