= Alter Zoll railway station =

Train station in Switzerland

Alter Zoll
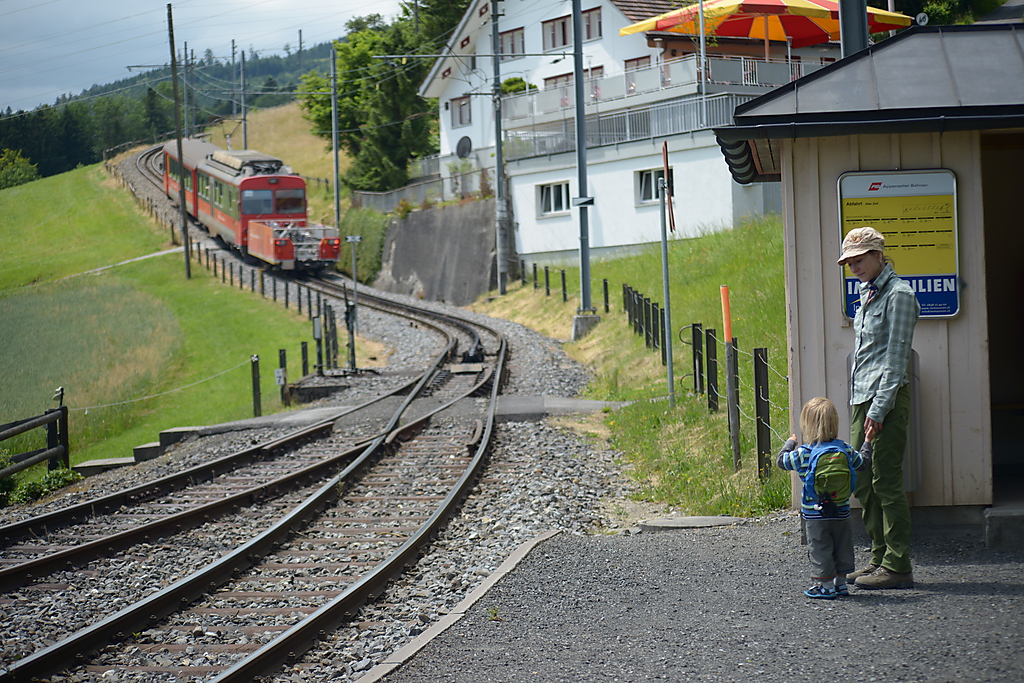
- A train near the station platform in 2014

General information
- Location: Altstätten; Switzerland
- Coordinates: 47°22′06.8″N 9°31′19.5″E
- Owner: Appenzell Railways
- Line: Altstätten–Gais line
- Train operators: Appenzell Railways

Services
Preceding station	St. Gallen S-Bahn	Following station
Warmesberg towards Gais	S24	Altstätten Stadt Terminus
Location
- Location within Switzerland Location within Canton of St. Gallen

Alter Zoll railway station (German: Bahnhof Alter Zoll) is a railway station in Altstätten, in the Swiss canton of St. Gallen. It is an intermediate stop on the 1,000 mm (3 ft 3 3/8 in) metre gauge Altstätten–Gais line and is served by local trains only.

== Services ==
Alter Zoll is served by the S24 of the St. Gallen S-Bahn:

- S24: hourly service between Gais and Altstätten Stadt.
