= Schachen railway station =

Schachen railway station may refer to:

- Schachen (Gais) railway station, in Gais, Appenzell Ausserrhoden, Switzerland
- Schachen (Herisau) railway station, in Herisau, Appenzell Ausserrhoden, Switzerland
- Schachen LU railway station, in Werthenstein, Lucerne, Switzerland
