= Schachen (Gais) railway station =

Train station in Switzerland

Schachen (Gais)

General information
- Location: Gais; Switzerland
- Coordinates: 47°21′41.5″N 9°28′38.0″E
- Owner: Appenzell Railways
- Line: Altstätten–Gais line
- Train operators: Appenzell Railways

Services
Preceding station	St. Gallen S-Bahn	Following station
Hebrig towards Gais	S24	Rietli towards Altstätten Stadt
Location
- Location within Switzerland Location within Canton of Appenzell Ausserrhoden

Schachen (Gais) railway station (German: Bahnhof Schachen (Gais)) is a railway station in Gais, in the Swiss canton of Appenzell Ausserrhoden. It is an intermediate stop on the 1,000 mm (3 ft 3 3/8 in) metre gauge Altstätten–Gais line and is served by local trains only.

== Services ==
Schachen (Gais) is served by the S24 of the St. Gallen S-Bahn:

- S24: hourly service between Gais and Altstätten Stadt.
