= Altstätten–Gais railway line =

Narrow gauge railway line in Switzerland

Altstätten–Gais railway (S24)
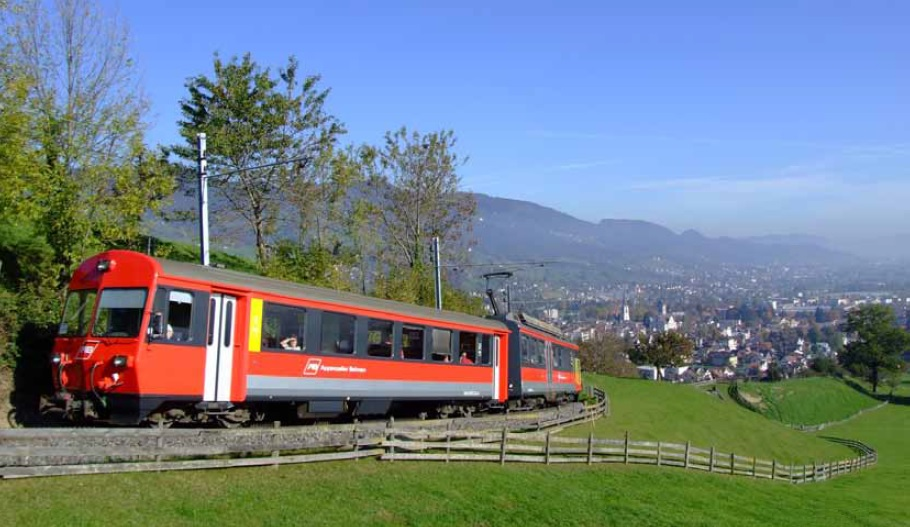
- Push-pull train on the rack section above Altstätten

Overview
- Locale: Switzerland

Service
- Route number: 856

Technical
- Line length: 7.65
- Track gauge: 1,000 mm (3 ft 3 3/8 in) metre gauge
- Electrification: 1000–1500 V DC overhead catenary
- Maximum incline: 16.0%

The Altstätten–Gais railway is a metre-gauge railway in Switzerland. The 7.65 km (4.75 mi) long line was opened in 1911 by the Altstätten-Gais-Bahn (AG) and has been operated by the Appenzell Railways (Appenzeller Bahnen, AB). Three sections of the line are equipped with the Strub rack system, while the rest of the line uses adhesion.

== History ==
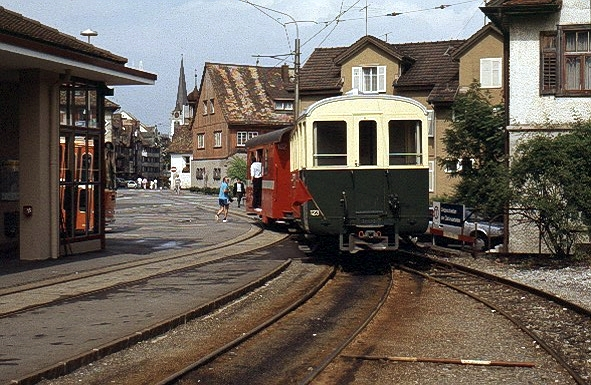
End of the line in Altstätten Stadt, 1988

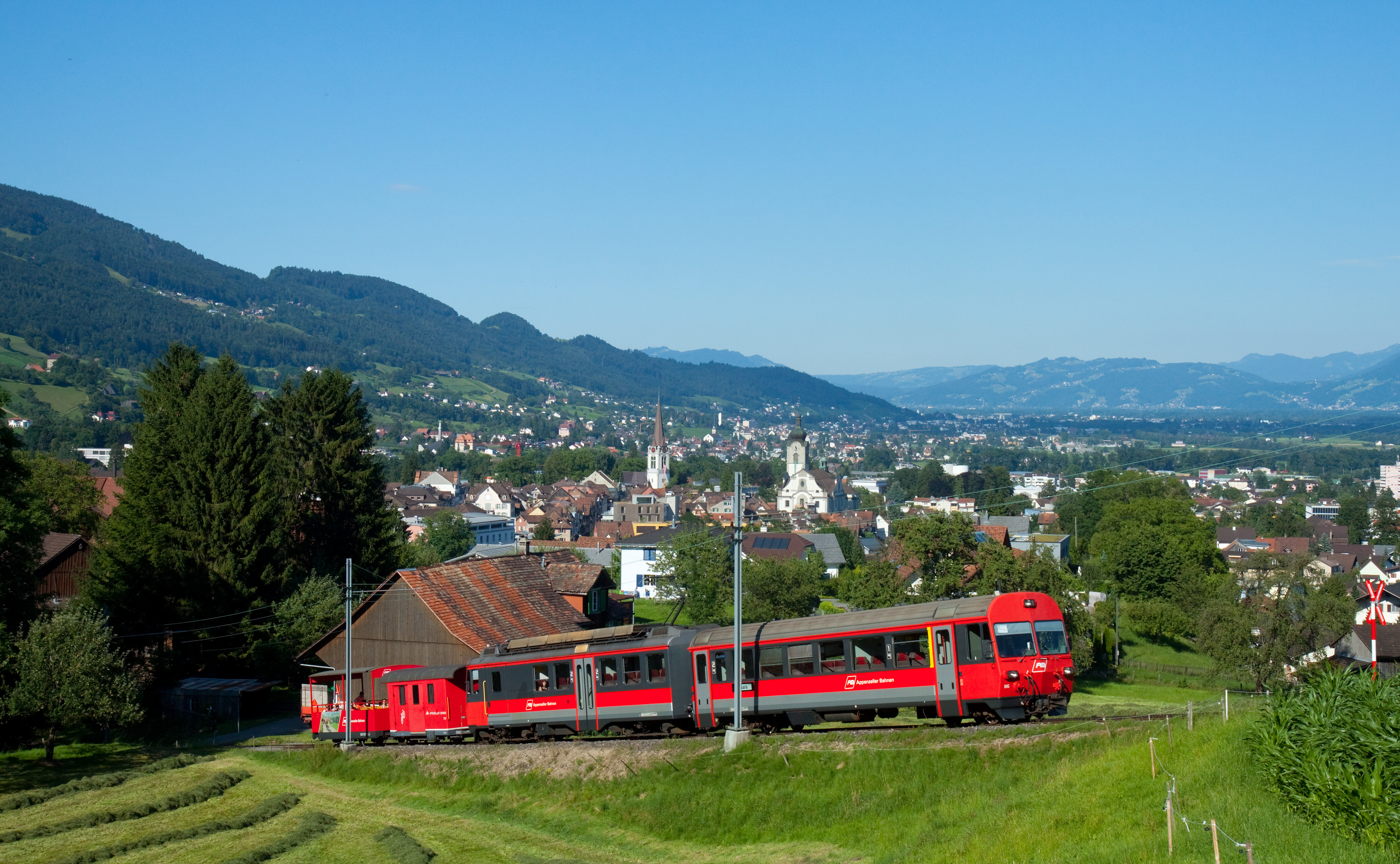
BDeh 4/4 motor coach and coaches ascending from Altstätten in 2010

The line from Altstätten Stadt via Stoss to Gais—where there was a connection to the line of the St. Gallen-Gais-Appenzell-Altstätten-Bahn (St. Gallen-Gais-Appenzell-Altstätten Railway) to St. Gallen—was opened on 18 November 1911 and operated with three CFe 3/3 class railcars. The three rack sections with a total of 3,264 m (10,709 ft) in length are located between Altstätten and Stoss, while the rest of the line to Gais is an adhesion railway. The railway was electrically operated at 1000V DC from the beginning.

Another short section in the old town of Altstätten was opened on 26 June 1912 between Stadt and Rathaus (town hall). The short link along Marktgasse established a connection to the Rathaus–Bahnhof SBB line of the Altstätten–Berneck tramway, opened in 1897 and operated by the Altstätten-Berneck-Bahn (ABB), which in turn was replaced in 1940 by the Altstätten–Berneck Trolleybus. The Altstätten–Gais line was managed by the ABB, which allowed the trains to run continuously between Gais and Altstätten SBB station.

As a result of a merger in 1949, the St. Gallen-Gais-Appenzell-Altstätten Railway (SGA) took over operations between Altstätten and Gais. In 1953, the catenary voltage was increased to 1500V, so that the then new ABDeh 4/4 6 to 8 railcars could operate freely on the whole SGA network. On 2 June 1973, tram operations were closed on the remaining section in Altstätten. Until the final closure of the Altstätten SBB–Altstätten Stadt section on 31 May 1975, the SGA trains continued to operate over this section.

Due to declining frequencies and a cost recovery rate of less than 30 percent, the cantons of Appenzell Ausserrhoden and St. Gallen have established an engineering office review of whether "more customer-friendly and cheaper alternatives" would be feasible for the three rack railways of the Appenzell Railways, from Altstätten Stadt to Gais, from Rorschach Hafen to Heiden and from Rheineck to Walzenhausen. In particular, a changeover to bus operations or fully automatic operations is under discussion.

Since 2013, the route from Altstätten Stadt to Gais is operated by the S24 service of the St. Gallen S-Bahn. The S24 is also part of the Bodensee S-Bahn.

== Operation ==
S24

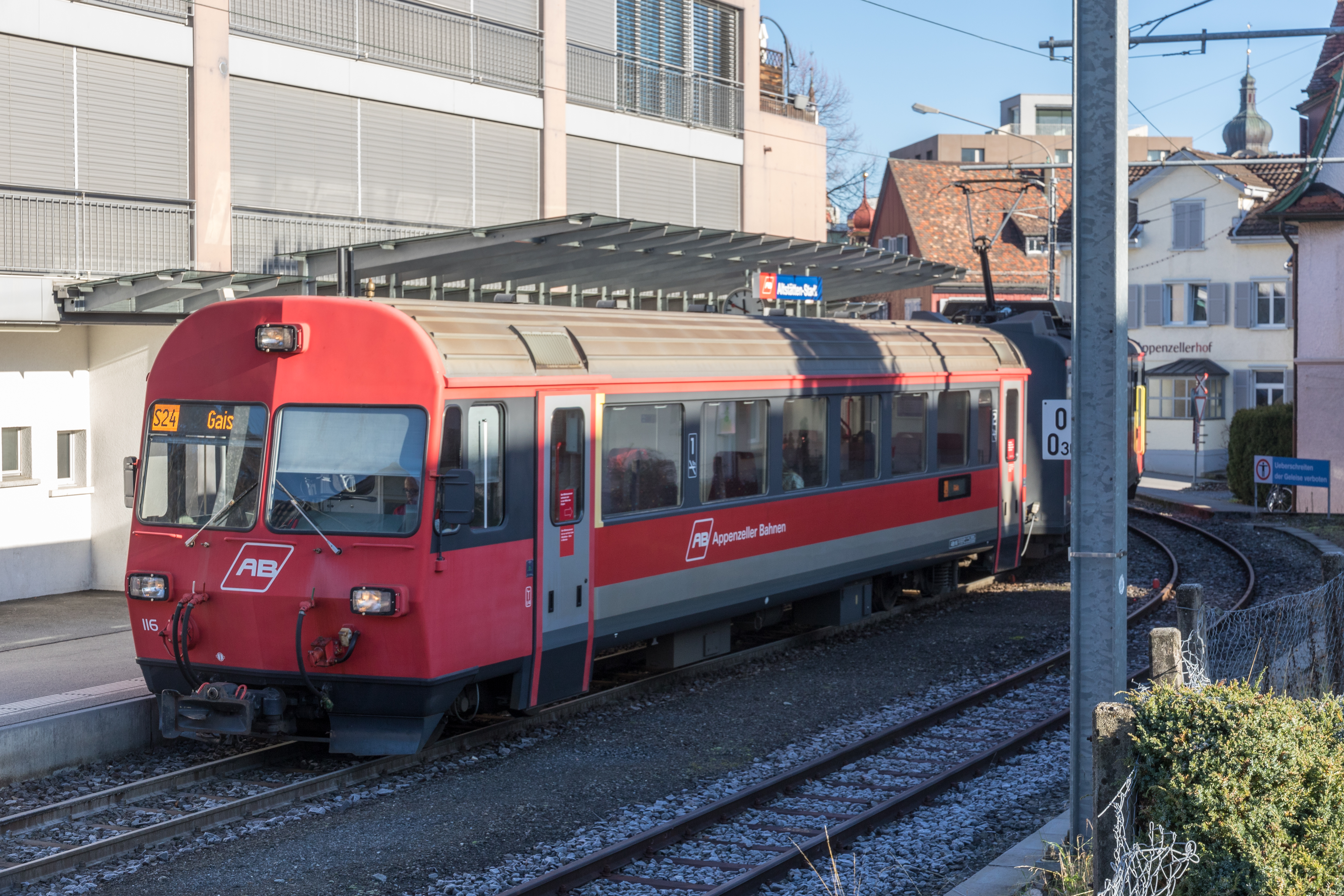
- AB BDeh 4-4 at Altstätten Stadt

Overview
- Service type: St. Gallen S-Bahn service
- Current operator(s): Appenzell Railways (AB)

Route
- Termini: Altstätten Stadt; Gais
- Stops: 7
- Service frequency: Every 60 minutes

Technical
- Rolling stock: Class BDeh 4-4

=== Route ===
S24 Altstätten Stadt – Stoss – Gais

- Altstätten Stadt
- Alter Zoll (stops only on request)
- Warmesberg (stops only on request)
- Kreuzstrasse (stops only on request)
- Stoss (stops only on request)
- Rietli (stops only on request)
- Schachen (Gais) (stops only on request)
- Hebrig (stops only on request)
- Gais (junction with the Appenzell–St. Gallen–Trogen railway)

During the warmer seasons and sunny weather, some services feature a special railroad car for the transportation of bicycles.

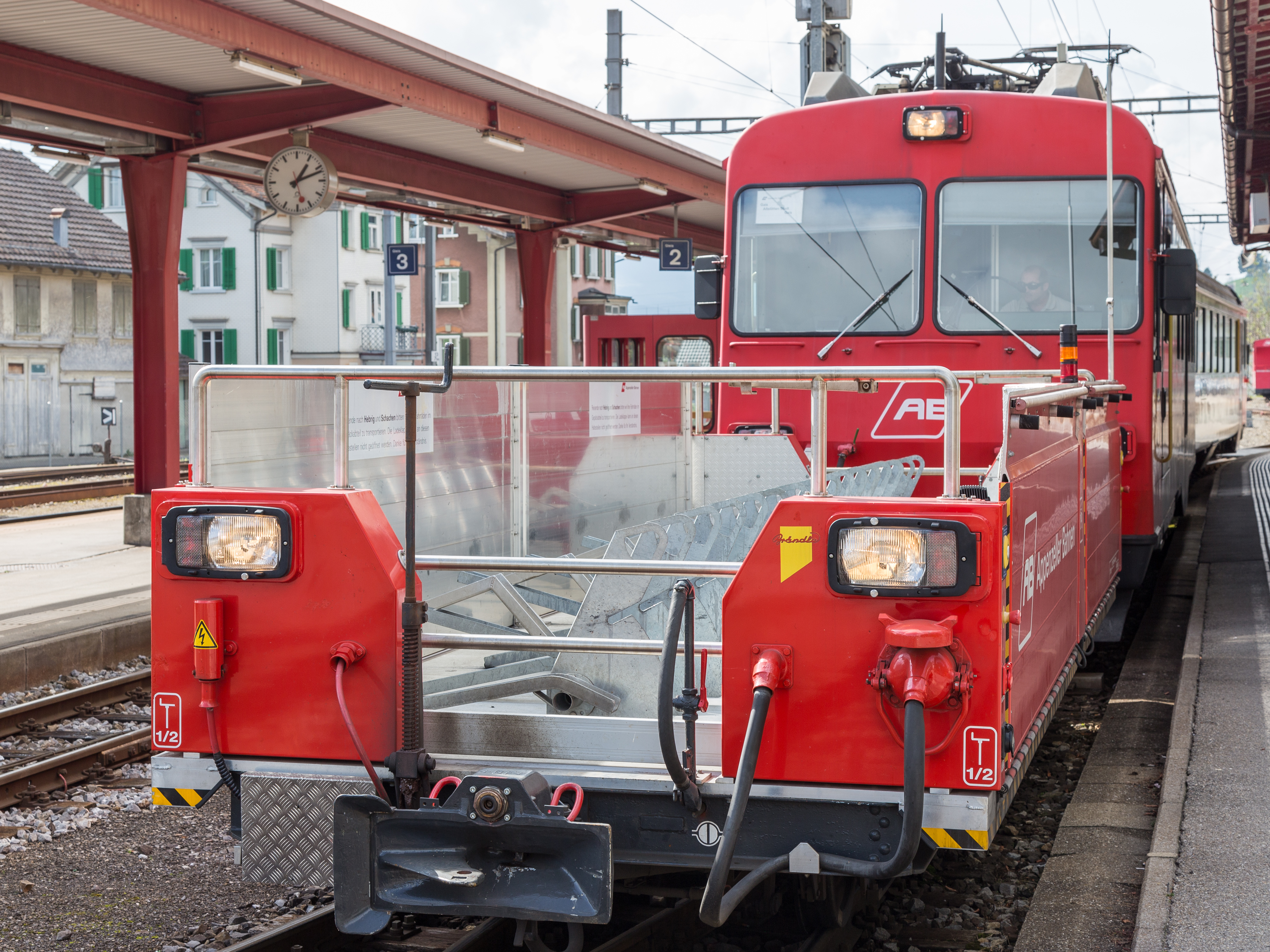
Bicycle transport
