= Treaty of Baden =

The Treaty or Peace of Baden may refer to:

- Peace of Baden (1412), a treaty between the Swiss Confederation and Frederick IV, Duke of Austria
- Treaty of Baden (1714), between France and the Holy Roman Empire, ending the War of the Spanish Succession
- Treaty of Baden (1718), ending the Toggenburg War in Swiss cantons
