= Stoss railway station =

Train station in Switzerland

Stoss
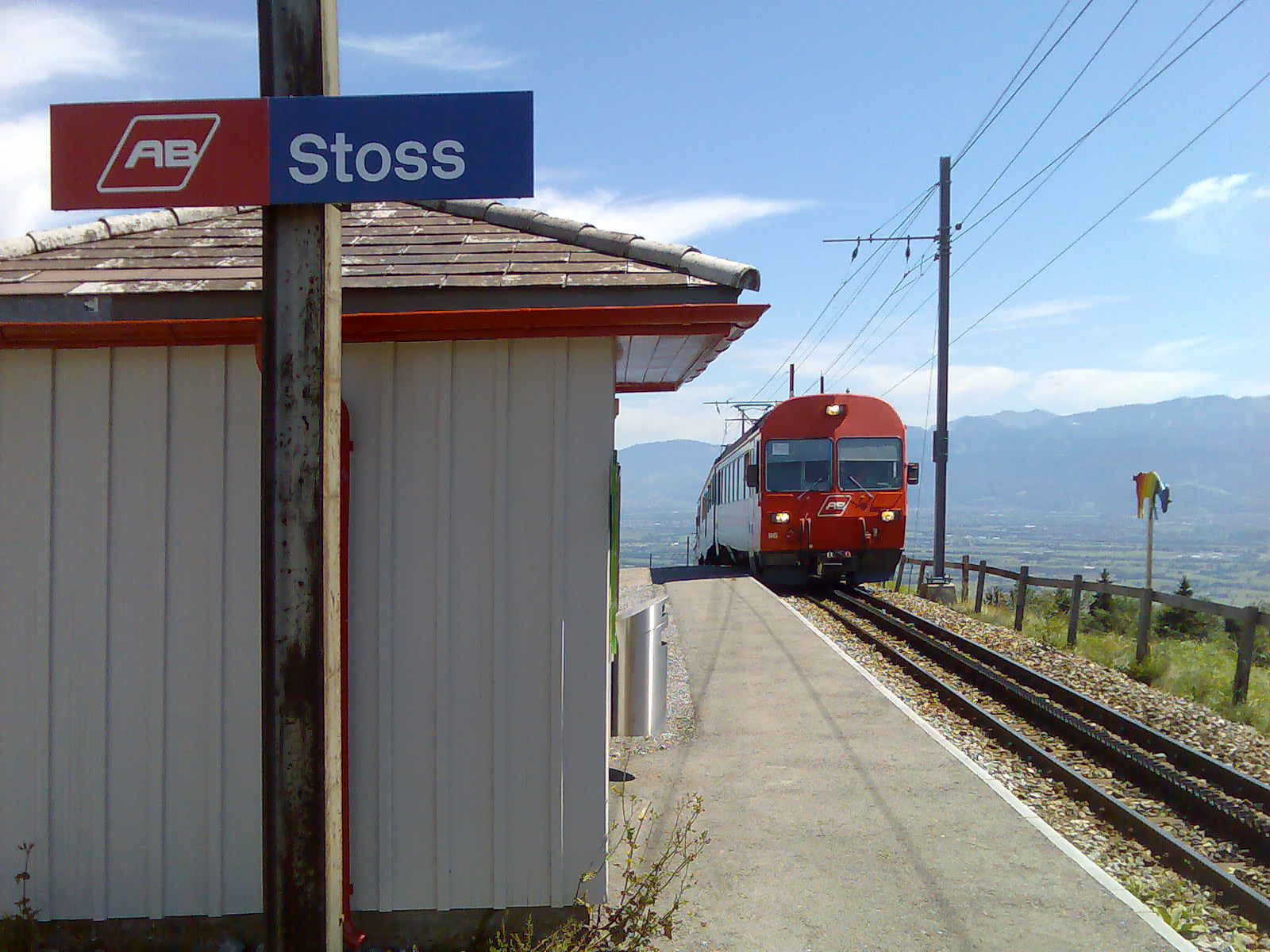
- Appenzell Railways train approaches Stoss in 2011

General information
- Location: Gais; Switzerland
- Coordinates: 47°21′39.0″N 9°29′42.4″E
- Owner: Appenzell Railways
- Line: Altstätten–Gais line
- Train operators: Appenzell Railways

Services
Preceding station	St. Gallen S-Bahn	Following station
Rietli towards Gais	S24	Kreuzstrasse towards Altstätten Stadt
Location
- Location within Switzerland Location within Canton of Appenzell Ausserrhoden

Stoss railway station (German: Bahnhof Stoss) is a railway station in Gais, in the Swiss canton of Appenzell Ausserrhoden. It is an intermediate stop on the 1,000 mm (3 ft 3 3/8 in) metre gauge Altstätten–Gais line and is served by local trains only.

== Services ==
Stoss is served by the S24 of the St. Gallen S-Bahn:

- S24: hourly service between Gais and Altstätten Stadt.
