= Stoß =

Stoß may refer to:

- Stoß (card game), a German gambling card game usually known as Tempeln
- Stoß (unit), a unit of cattle stock density

== See also ==
- Stoss (disambiguation)
