= List of mayors of Altstätten =

Coat of arms of Altstätten

This is a list of mayors of Altstätten, Switzerland. The mayor (Stadtpräsident) chairs the city council (Stadtrat). Earlier terms for "mayor" were: Gemeindeammann, Stadtammann.

Mayor of Altstätten
| Term | Mayor | Lifespan | Party | Notes |
|---|---|---|---|---|
| 1885–1903 | Reinhard Custer | (1857–1905) | | |
| 1924–1945 | Jakob Zünd | (1874–1953) | | |
| | Johannes Walt | (1814–1899) | | |
| 1956–1976 | Anton Stadler | (born 1920) | | |
| 1977–1991 | Niklaus Rüegger | | | |
| 1992–2006 | Josef Signer | | | |
| 2007–2012 | Daniel Bühler | (born c. 1960) | FDP/PRD | |
| 2013–present | Ruedi Mattle | | independent | |
