= Ferdinand Gehr =

Swiss painter

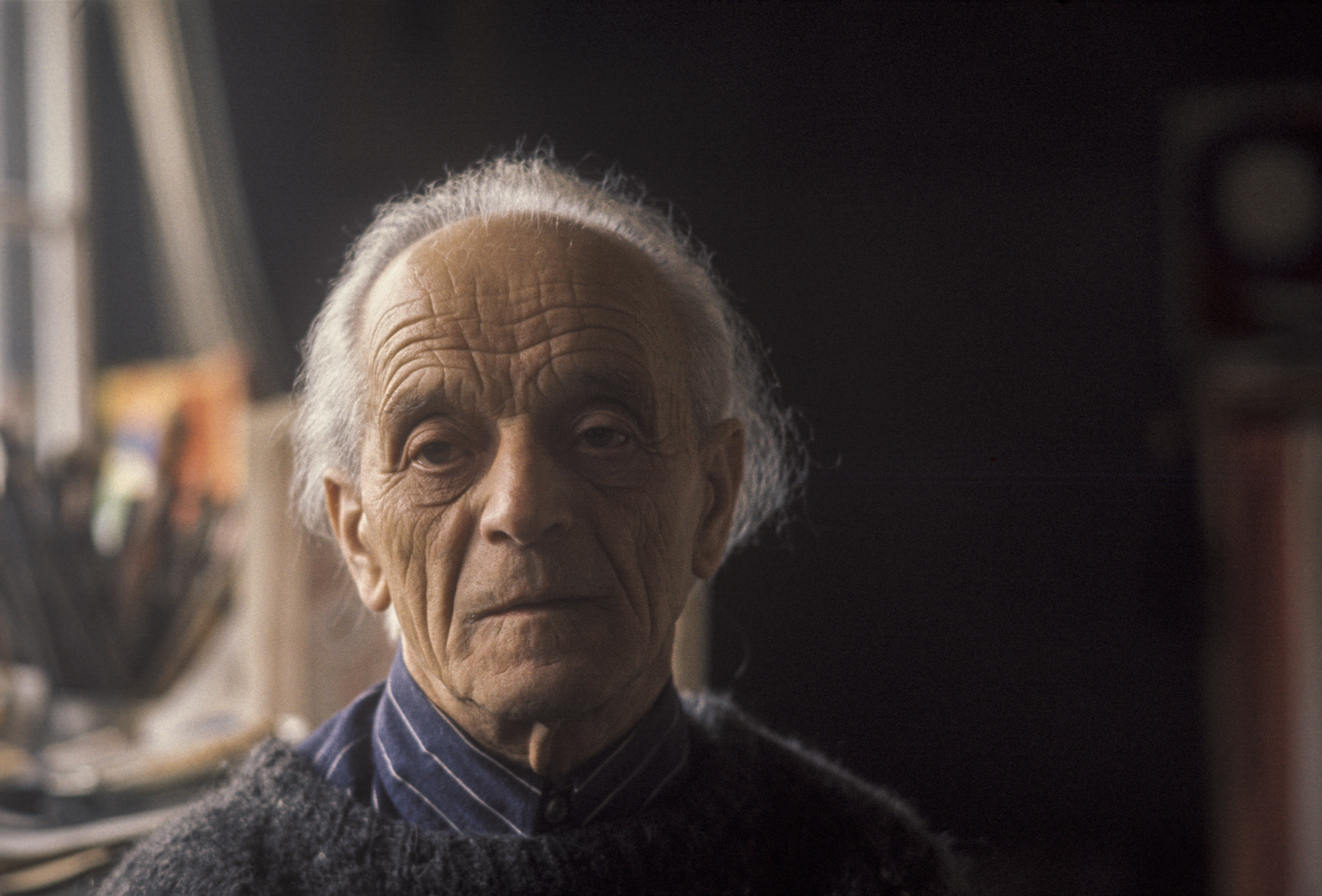
- Gehr in Altstätten, 1979
- Born: 6 January 1896; Oberuzwil, Switzerland
- Died: 10 July 1996 (aged 100); Altstätten, Switzerland
- Known for: Painting, stained glass, watercolour, woodcut, murals
- Spouse: Mathilde Mazenauer

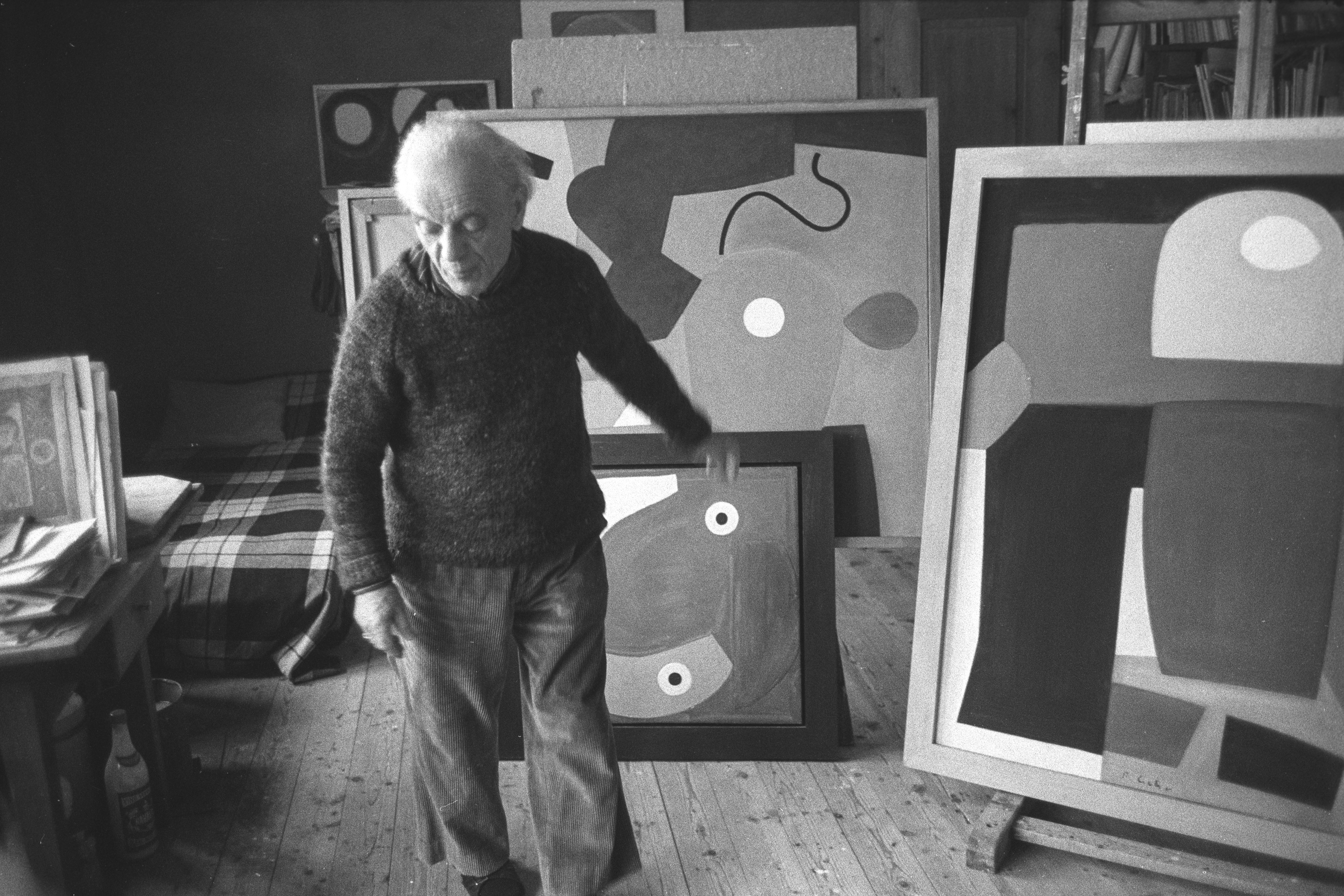
Gehr in his studio, 1976

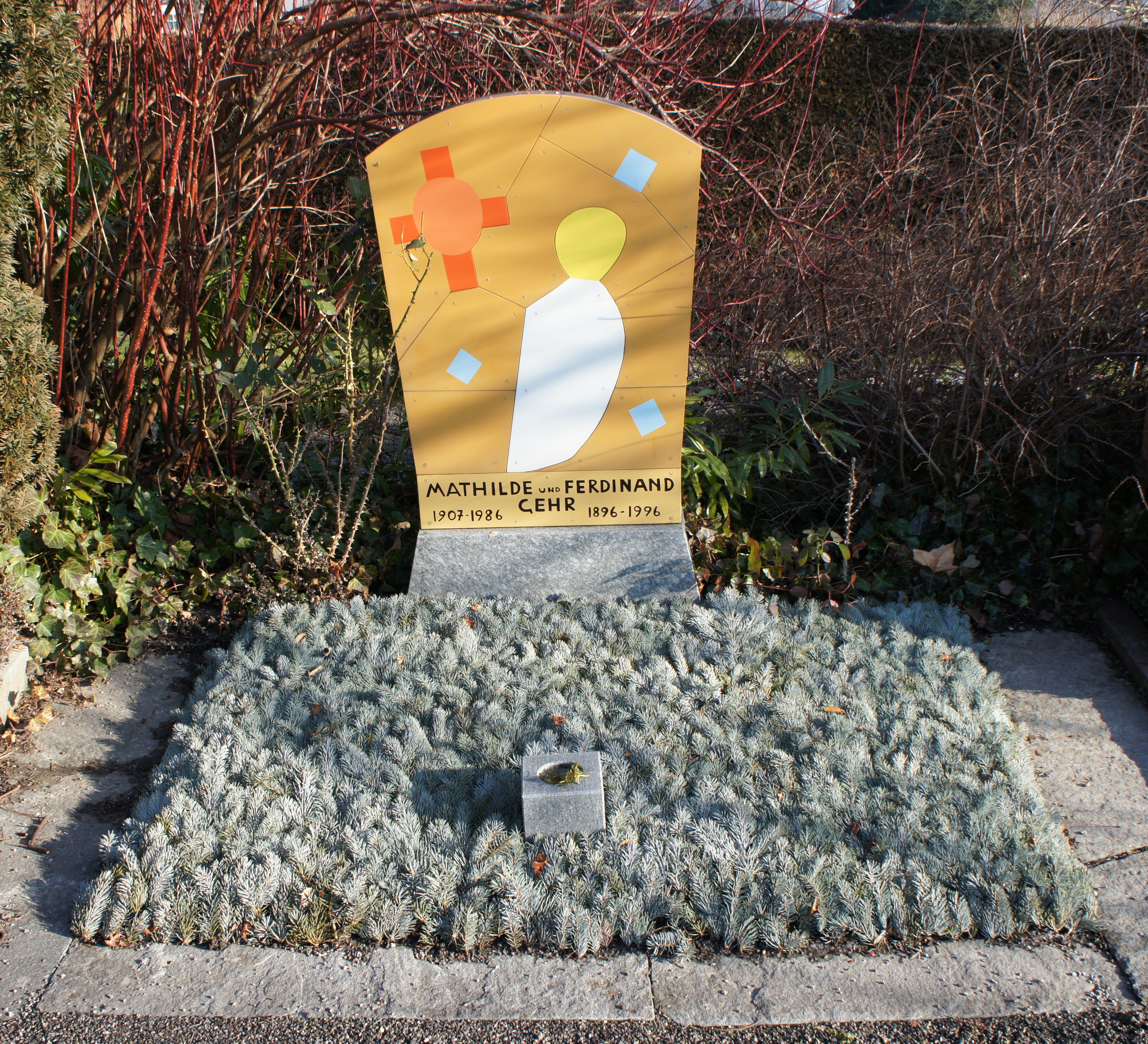
Grave of Ferdinand and Mathilde Gehr in Altstätten

Ferdinand Gehr (1896–1996) was a Swiss painter and stained-glass artist associated especially with church art. Active from the 1920s onward, he developed a distinctive modern approach to Christian subjects and became an important figure in the renewal of church painting in Switzerland. His work was at times controversial, including in Oberwil, Zug, where murals for the Church of Bruderklaus were veiled after protests. His work was later the subject of major exhibitions and reviews.

== Biography ==
Ferdinand Gehr was born in Oberuzwil on 6 January 1896. The son of a hand embroiderer, he attended the Schule des Industrie- und Gewerbemuseums Basel from 1911 and worked as a draughtsman in Flawil between 1914 and 1918. He then studied at the Gewerbeschule St. Gallen, followed by training in fresco technique in Florence in 1922 and 1923. In the winter of 1923 to 1924, he studied in Paris with André Lhote.

He opened his first studio in Niederglatt in 1924 and another in Niederuzwil in 1928. In 1928 and 1929, he travelled in Germany. In 1938 he married Mathilde Mazenauer, with whom he had five children. In 1970, he received an honorary doctorate from the University of Fribourg. He died in Altstätten on 10 July 1996.

== Work ==
Gehr worked in painting, stained glass, watercolour, woodcut and murals, and was a significant renewer of church painting in Switzerland. Flower motifs and stained glass also formed an important part of his work.

In the late 1920s, he developed a distinctive style for Christian subjects, while also producing landscapes and portraits influenced by Paul Cézanne. He was concerned with developing a new approach to religious art. His work was marked by a reduction of form and colour while continuing to use figurative imagery.

From 1930 onward, Gehr carried out numerous commissions for murals and stained-glass windows in Switzerland and abroad, especially for newly built Catholic churches. He developed a stylised abstract approach to Christian subjects that drew both praise and strong criticism. His frescoes for the Church of Bruderklaus in Oberwil, Zug, rendered Gospel scenes in large-scale, strongly coloured compositions. After protests in 1957, the frescoes were covered for a long period.

== Exhibitions ==
Gehr’s first major survey exhibition was held in St. Gallen in 1956. In 1994, he had a major solo exhibition at the Kunsthaus Zürich. Posthumous retrospectives were held at the Kunstmuseum St. Gallen and the Fundação Calouste Gulbenkian in 2001. In 2017, the Kunstmuseum Olten staged the exhibition Ferdinand Gehr - Bauen an der Kunst.

== Reception ==
Aargauer Zeitung described Gehr as a pioneer of modern religious painting and noted that his church art had long met with resistance both within the church and in parts of the art world.

SRF described him as the best-known representative of religious painting in Switzerland and said a 2001 retrospective at the Kunstmuseum St. Gallen presented him not only as a major church painter but also as an early representative of modern painting.

St. Galler Tagblatt described Gehr’s work as innovative and noted that his religious works, including those in Oberwil, had provoked public controversy in the 1950s.
