= Martin Rechsteiner =

Liechtensteiner footballer (born 1989)

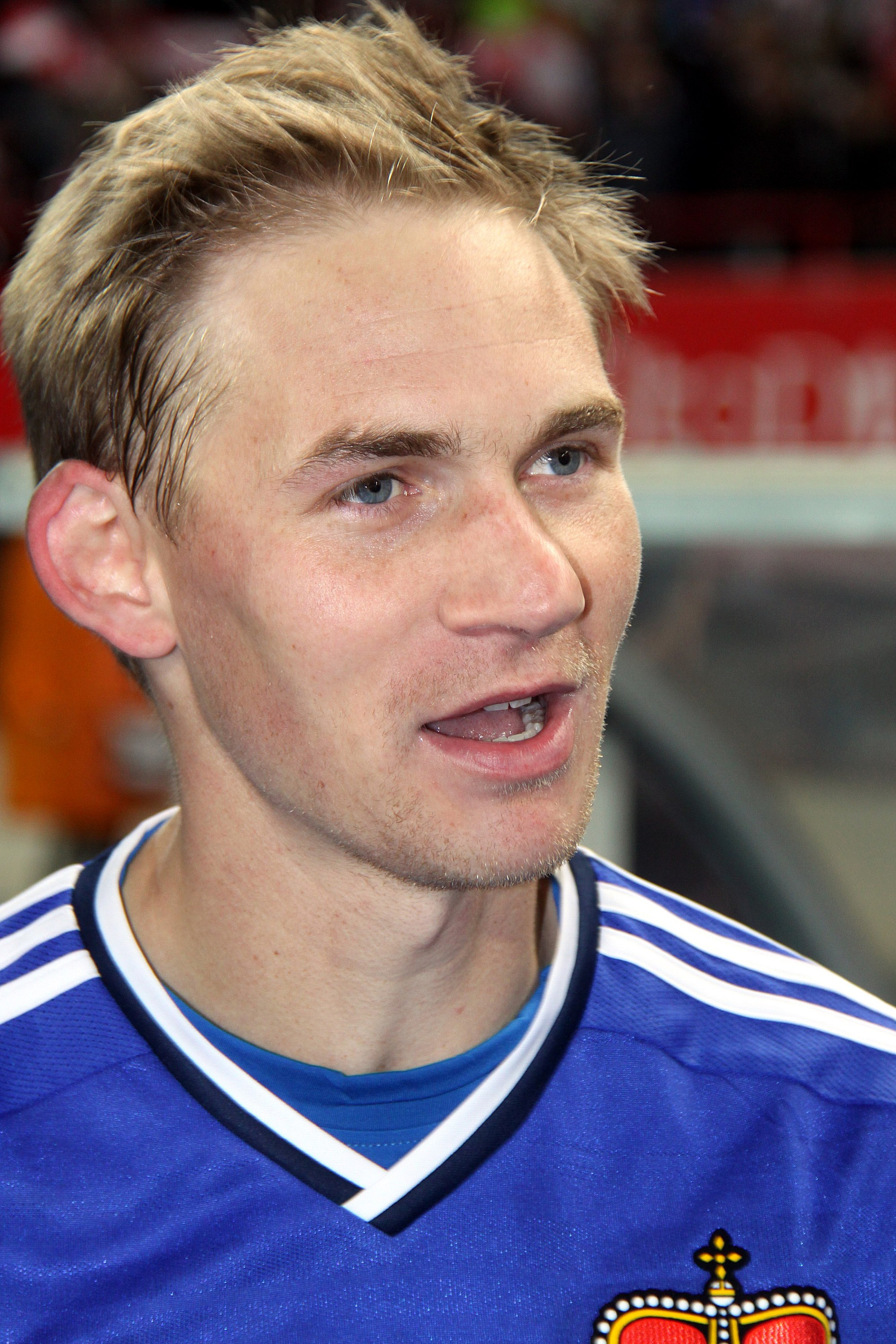

Personal information
- Date of birth: 15 February 1989 (age 37)
- Place of birth: Altstätten, Switzerland
- Height: 1.75 m (5 ft 9 in)
- Position: Right back

Senior career*
Years	Team	Apps	(Gls)
2006–2007	FC Schaan	15	(0)
2007–2008	FC Balzers	23	(2)
2008–2009	USV Eschen/Mauren	13	(0)
2009–2012	FC Vaduz	58	(0)
2012–2019	FC Balzers	109	(2)
Total		218	(4)

International career^{‡}
2008–2019	Liechtenstein	47	(0)
- * Club domestic league appearances and goals as of 13 February 2020 ‡ National team caps and goals as of 13 February 2020

Martin Rechsteiner (born 15 February 1989) is a former footballer who played as a right back. Born in Switzerland, he represented the Liechtenstein national team.

== Career ==
Born in Altstätten, Switzerland, Rechsteiner played club football for FC Schaan, USV Eschen/Mauren and FC Vaduz.

He made his senior international debut for Liechtenstein in 2008, and appeared in FIFA World Cup qualifying matches.

After a three-and-a-half-year retirement from international football, Rechsteiner was called in for the UEFA Euro 2016 qualifying match against Montenegro on 5 September 2015.

Rechsteiner announced his retirement from football at the end of 2019. He is a co-trainer of the Liechtenstein U-17s.
