= Peace of Baden (1412) =

1412 Austro-Swiss peace treaty

The Peace of Baden was a peace treaty for 50 years that was signed between Duke Frederick II of Austria and the Swiss Confederation to end a five-year war. Austria agreed to recognise the possessions of the Swiss Confederation, and the Swiss recognized the duke's claims in their territories.

== Background ==
In 1403, the Abbott Kuno von Stoffelen lost the support of the imperial towns around Appenzell. The Abbott warned Duke Frederick II of Austria that Appenzell could become another Switzerland if no measure would be taken. Frederick promised him assistance and sent an army with noble cavaliers, which started a five-year war between the Austria and the Appenzellers, the latter of whom supported by the Swiss Confederation.

In 1411, the Appenzellers concluded a treaty of alliance and citizenship on November 25, 1411, with the Swiss Confederation, except Bern. Frederick realised that the Swiss Confederation had become too strong and that its friendship would be more desirable than is enmity. He therefore agreed to sign a peace treaty for 50 years with the eight free cantons.

== Peace treaty ==
The peace treaty was signed in Baden on May 28, 1412. Austria agreed to recognise the right to all of its possessions of the Swiss Confederation. The confederates accepted all of the duke's claims within their territories related to mortgages, fiefs, and prescriptive rights. The towns of Scafhausen, Walshut, Laufenbur, Seckingen, Rheinfelden, Diessenhofen, Baden, Rapperswil, Brugg, Bremgarten, Zofingen, Sursee, Lenzburg, Mellingen, Aarau, and Fraeuenfeld were obliged to ratify the agreement.
