= Carl Eugen Keel =

Swiss painter

Carl Eugen Keel (1885–1961) was a Swiss painter. He is principally known for his woodcuts, usually portraying town life, and often hand-coloured. He also produced oil paintings, watercolours, wood carvings, lino cuts and wrought iron sculptures. He was born in Altstätten in 1885 and died in Rebstein in 1961. He also lived in Ascona alongside other artists.
