= Kuno von Stoffeln =

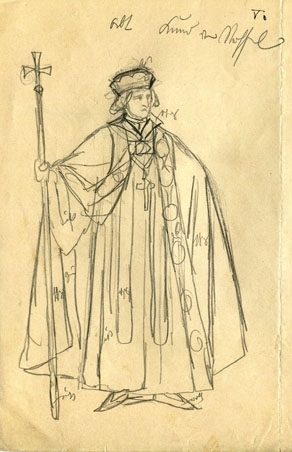
Kuno von Stoffeln

Kuno von Stoffeln (born before 1365; died 19 October 1411) was from 1379 until his death Prince abbot of Saint Gall. He descended from the family von Stoffeln with property on Castle Hohenstoffeln on the Hohenstoffeln at Hegau. He was substantially involved in the Appenzell Wars as the city refused to pay homage to him, and the Appenzellers, his subjects, even refused to pay taxes. Due to the price decline of grain after a disastrous plague epidemic, Kuno had been obliged to drastically increase taxes in order to balance the loss of revenue. He first aligned with cities at Lake Constance that were devoted to him and later with Duke Frederick IV of Austria in order to put an end to the population's attempts at freedom. He was not granted any luck in battle, however: the abbot's army lost one battle after another. Eventually, Kuno was forced to sell or lease estates in order to fill the abbey till. He left behind a completely run down monastery which had become meaningless in comparison to the aspiring city. In chronicles of the 15th century, Kuno is described as a true spectre.

== Reading list ==
- Gössi, Anton: St. Gallen - Äbte: Kuno von Stoffeln, 1379-1411. in: Helvetia Sacra. III: Die Orden mit Benediktinerregel. 2/1: Frühe Klöster, die Benediktiner und Benediktinerinnen in der Schweiz. Francke Verlag, Bern 1986, p. 1313–14.
- Dierauer, Johannes: Kuno von Stoffeln. in: Allgemeine Deutsche Biographie (ADB), Vol 17. Duncker & Humblot, Leipzig 1883, p. 384–86.
