= Schachen LU railway station =

Railway station in Werthenstein, Switzerland

Schachen LU
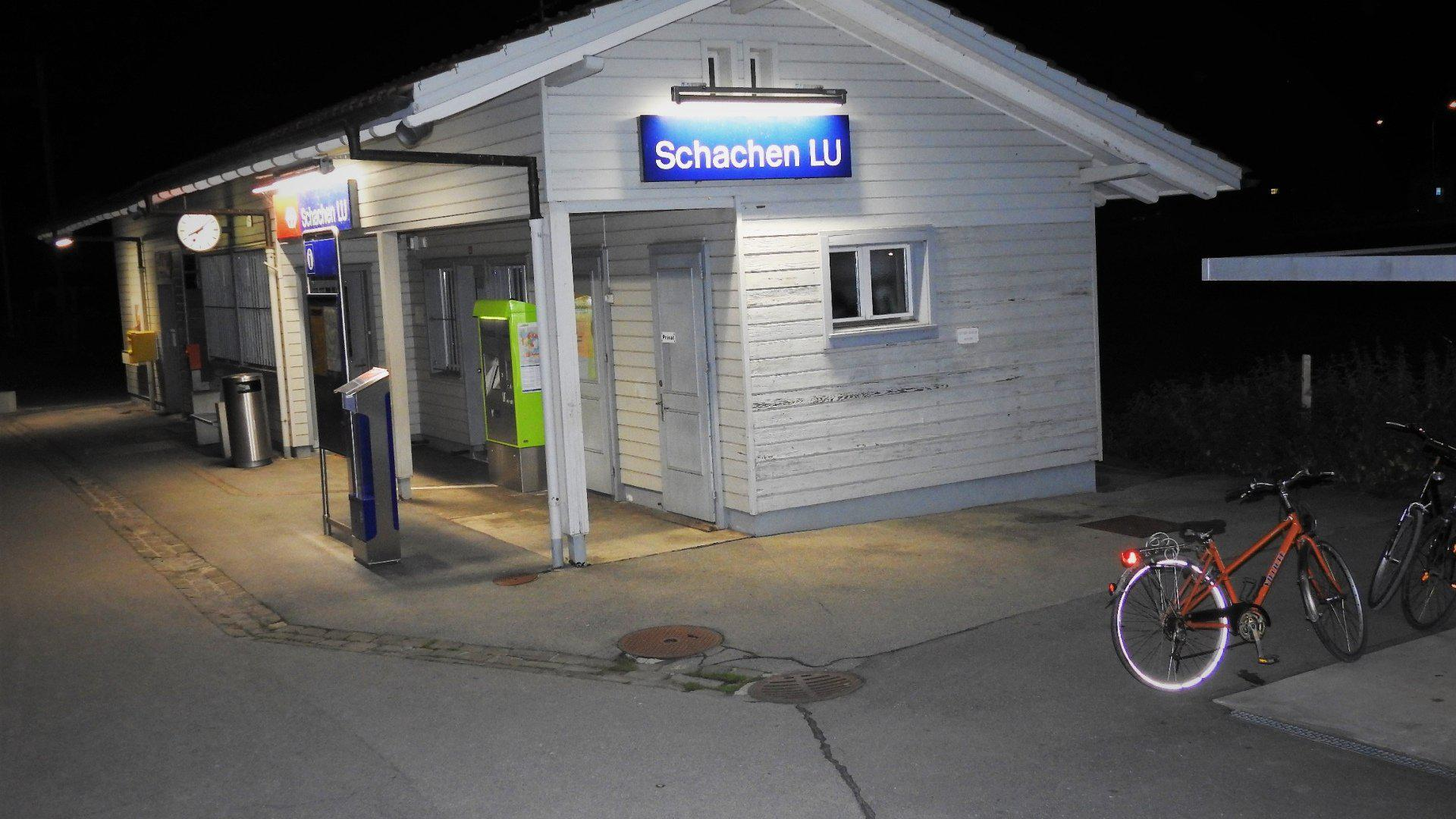
- The station building in 2018

General information
- Location: Werthenstein; Switzerland
- Coordinates: 47°02′17″N 8°08′36″E
- Elevation: 518 m (1,699 ft)
- Owner: Swiss Federal Railways
- Line: Bern–Lucerne line
- Platforms: 2: 1 side platform; 1 island platform
- Tracks: 2
- Train operators: BLS AG

Construction
- Parking: Yes (8 spaces)
- Cycle facilities: Yes (18 spaces)
- Accessible: No

Other information
- Station code: 8508217 (SCHA)
- Fare zone: 23 (Passepartout)

Passengers
- 2023: 450 per weekday (BLS)

Services
Preceding station	Lucerne S-Bahn	Following station
Werthenstein towards Langenthal or Langnau i.E.	S6	Malters towards Lucerne
Location

Schachen LU railway station (German: Bahnhof Schachen LU) is a railway station in the municipality of Werthenstein, in the Swiss canton of Lucerne. It is an intermediate stop on the standard gauge Bern–Lucerne line of Swiss Federal Railways.

== Services ==
As of the December 2024 timetable change, the following services stop at Schachen LU:

- Lucerne S-Bahn S6: hourly service between Lucerne and Langnau i.E. or Langenthal; the train splits at Wolhusen.

== Gallery ==
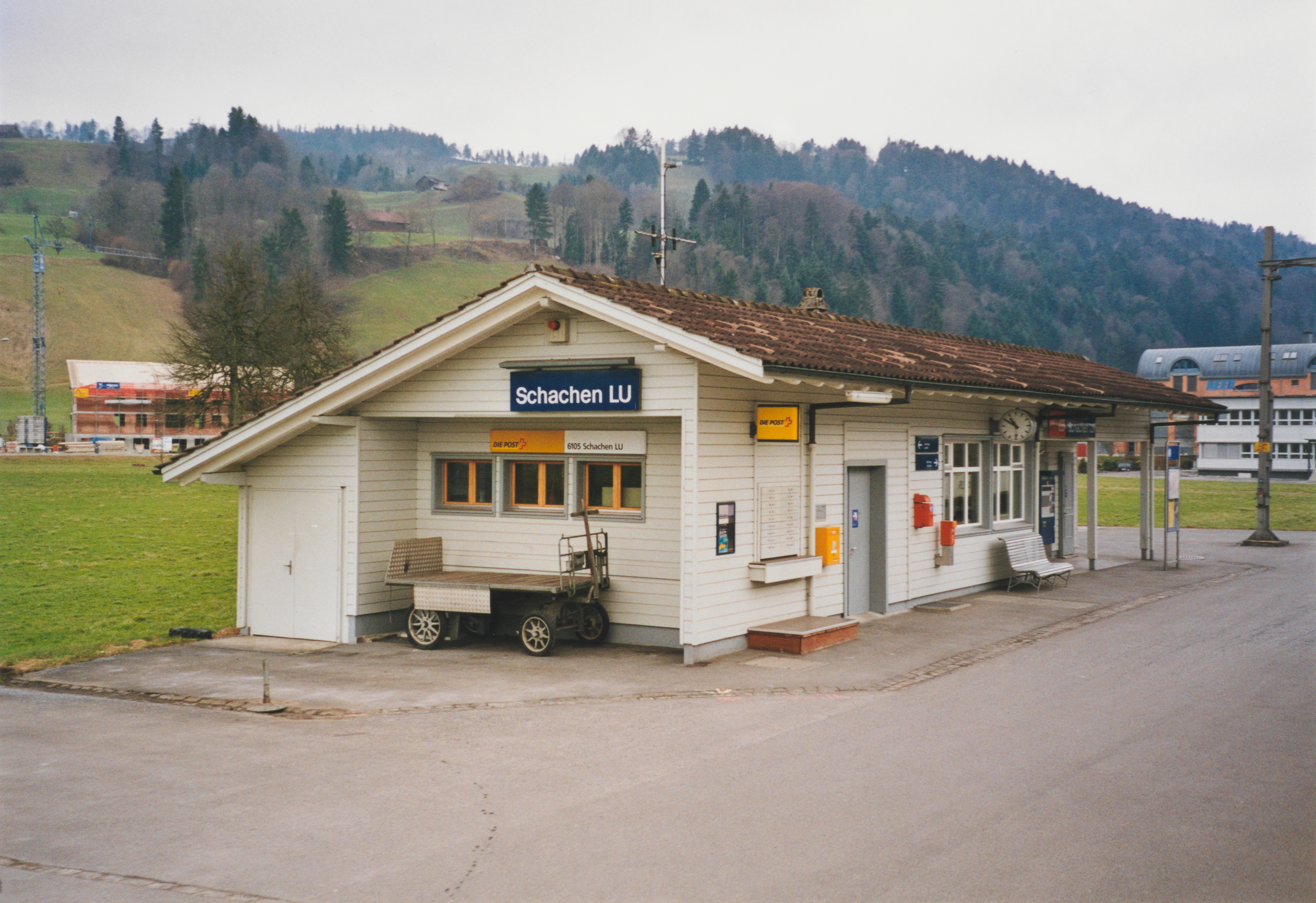
station building in 2003
