= Appenzell Wars =

Series of conflicts involving Switzerland

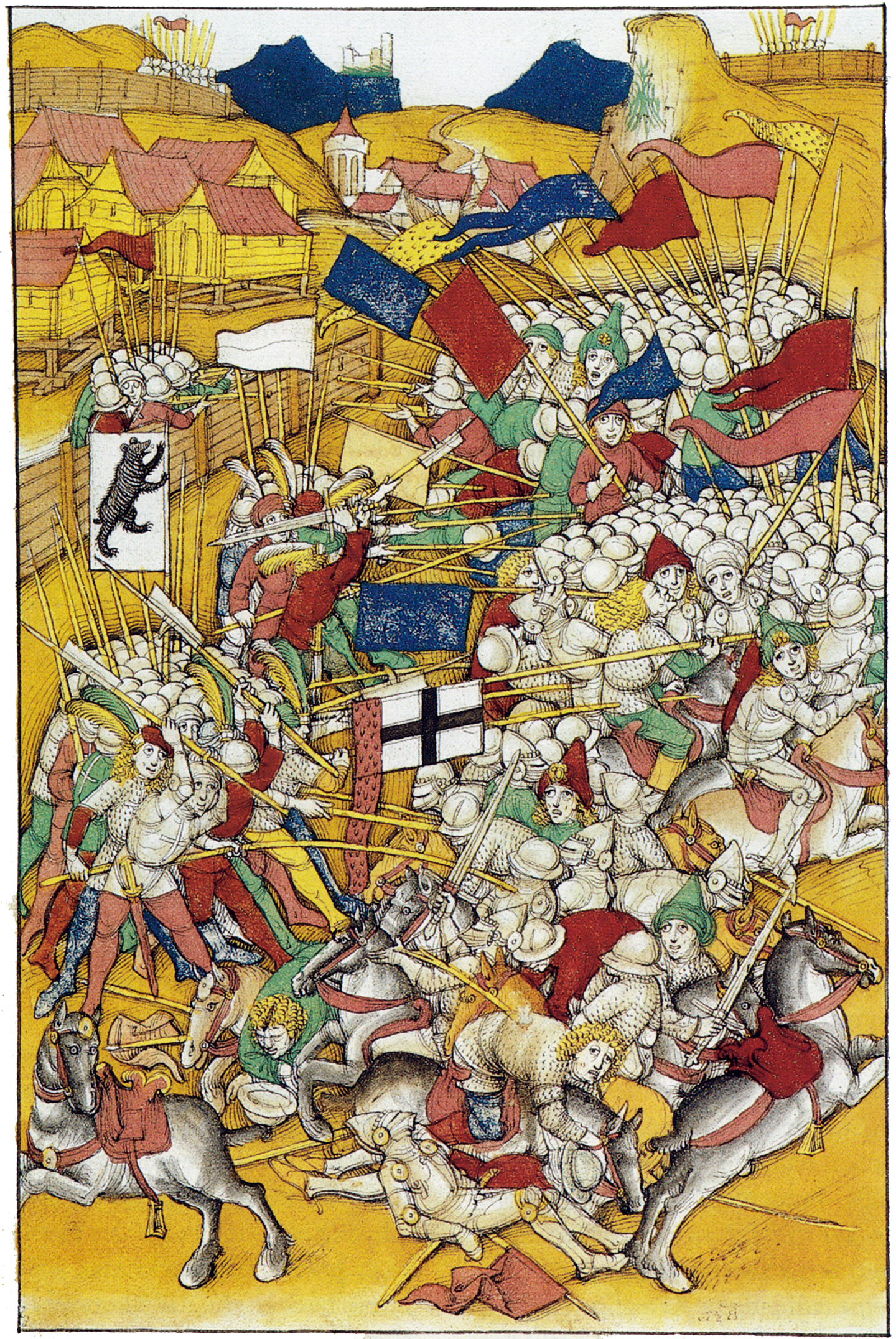
The Battle of Vögelinsegg, 15 May 1403. Illustration in the Spiezer Chronik

The Appenzell Wars (German: Appenzeller Kriege) were a series of conflicts that lasted from 1401 until 1429 in the Appenzell region of modern-day Switzerland. The wars consisted of uprisings of cooperative groups, such as the farmers of Appenzell or the craftsmen of the city of St. Gallen, against the traditional medieval power structure represented by the House of Habsburg and the Prince-Abbot of the Abbey of St. Gall.

The conflict was one of a number of popular revolts in late-medieval Europe. It resulted in greater autonomy for Appenzell and its association with the Old Swiss Confederacy, of which it would become a member (canton) in 1513.

== Background ==
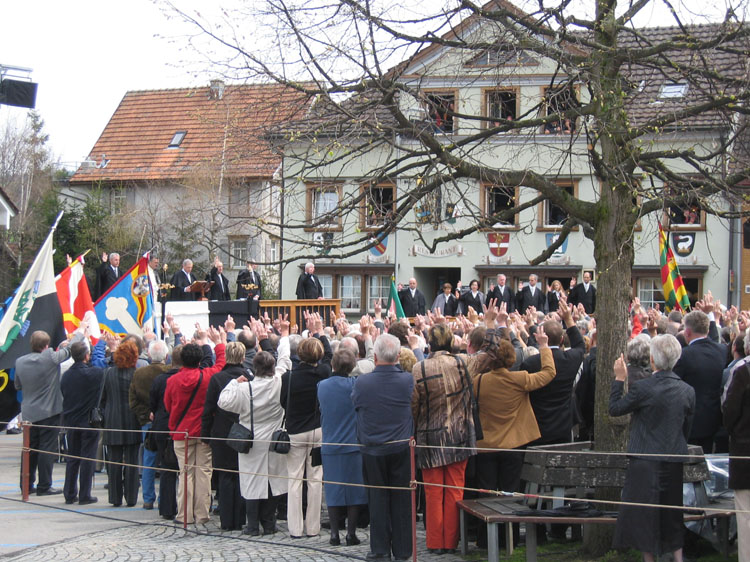
A Landsgemeinde in Appenzell, 2005. The direct representation of the Landsgemeinde conflicted with the autocratic government of the Abbey and the Habsburgs

Appenzell (the name in Latin: abbatis cella means "cell (i.e. estate) of the abbot") had been under the personal control of the abbot of St. Gall. While the Prince-Abbot appointed agents or bailiffs, the communities in Appenzell were governed by a council appointed by the Landsgemeinde, in which every citizen could vote. The success of the Swiss Confederation, with similar Landsgemeinden, against the aristocratic Habsburgs encouraged the Appenzell citizens to consider throwing off the Abbot's agents. By the 1360s, conflicts over mortmain, taxes, and tithes were causing concern for both parties. Both the abbot and Appenzell wanted to protect their rights and interests by joining the new Swabian League of Cities. Appenzell was admitted into the League in 1377, on the condition of being subordinate to the cities of St. Gallen and Konstanz.

In 1379, Kuno von Stoffeln became Prince-Abbot of St. Gall. Soon he reached an agreement with Appenzell, who had initially refused to pay him homage, and the city of St. Gallen. In 1392, Kuno, whose rule became increasingly authoritarian, formed an alliance with the Duchy of Austria, which was renewed in 1402. In response, in 1401 Appenzell entered into an alliance with the city of St. Gallen to protect their rights and freedoms.

== Outbreak ==
Following increasing conflicts between the Appenzellers and the abbot's agents, including the bailiff of Appenzell demanding that a dead body be dug up because he wanted the man's clothes, the Appenzellers planned an uprising. On a certain day, throughout the abbot's lands, they attacked the bailiffs and drove them out of the land. Following unsuccessful negotiations Appenzell and St. Gallen entered into a treaty. The treaty between St. Gallen and Appenzell marked a break between the abbot and his estates. Perhaps fearing the Habsburgs, in 1402 the League expelled Appenzell. During the same year, St. Gallen reached an agreement with the abbot and Appenzell could no longer count on St. Gallen's support.

Appenzell declared itself ready to stand against the abbot, and in 1403 formed an alliance with the Canton of Schwyz, a member of the Old Swiss Confederacy that had defeated the Austrians in the previous century. Glarus provided less support, but authorized any citizen who wished to support Appenzell to do so. In response, the League raised an army and marched to St. Gallen before heading toward Appenzell. In May 1403, the abbot's and the League's troops marched toward Trogen. On 15 May 1403, they entered the pass to Speicher and outside the village of Vögelinsegg met the Appenzell army. A small force of about 80 Appenzellers started the attack from a hill over the valley, with about 300 soldiers from Schwyz and 200 from Glarus moving around the flanks of the army. When the League's cavalry charged up the hill, they met 2000 Appenzellers and were forced to retreat. During the retreat, about 600 horsemen and many of the 5000 infantry were killed by the Appenzell army. The League signed an armistice with Appenzell at Arbon, but the peace was short lived.

== Course of the wars ==
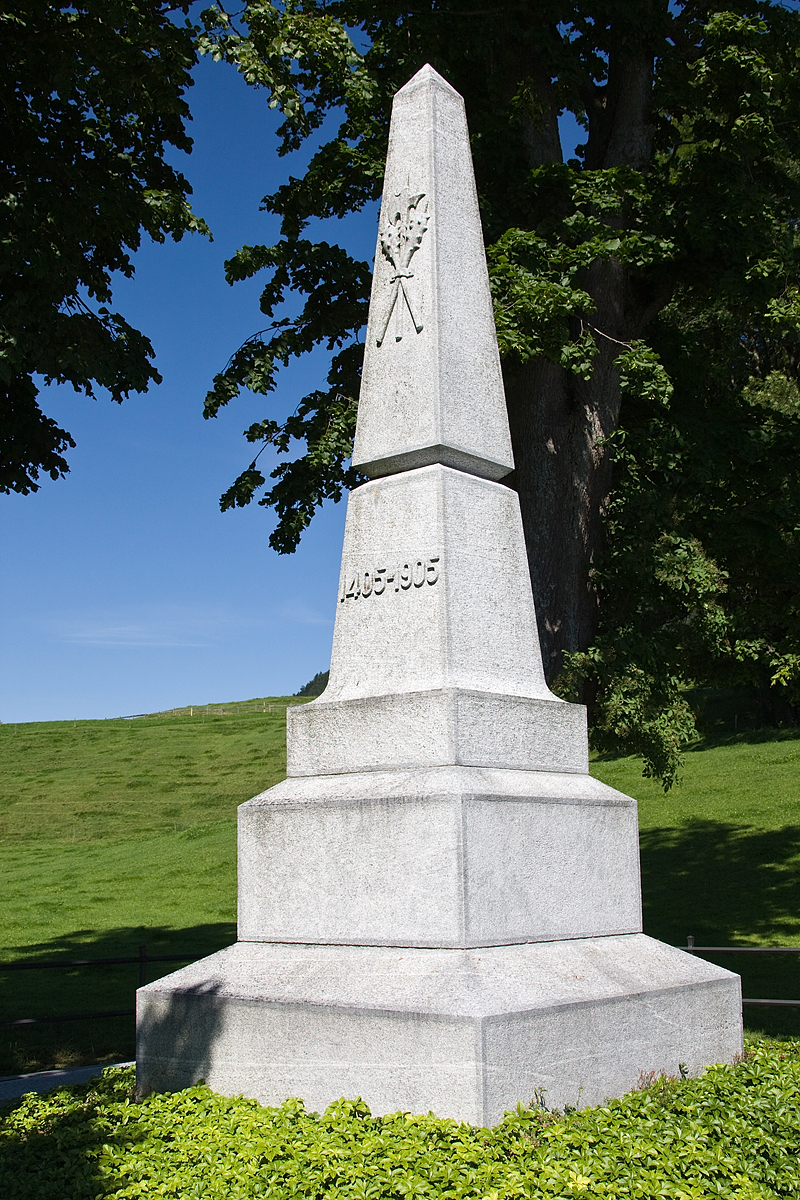
A memorial on the site of the Battle of Stoss Pass in 1405

Appenzell continued its incursions into the abbot's lands in the Rhine valley and around Lake Constance. Additionally, over the next two years, the city of St. Gallen and Appenzell drew closer, which led to an intervention by Frederick IV, Duke of Austria, in support of the abbot. He provided the abbot with two Austrian armies to attack Appenzell. On 17 June 1405, the main army marched into Stoss Pass on the border of Appenzell and there met the Appenzell army. Following a brutal battle, the Austrian army was forced to retreat. The story that the Austrians retreated when they saw a second Appenzeller army, which was actually the women of Appenzell who had come to help their husbands and brothers, only appears in later sources and is not considered accurate.

Following the Appenzell victory at Stoss Pass, they formed an alliance with the city of St. Gallen, which was known as the Bund ob dem See ("alliance over the lake", referring to the nearby Lake Constance). The creation of the Bund shook the foundation of Austrian power in the Lake Constance region. By 1406 they had taken more than 60 castles and destroyed 30. During the expansion, Appenzell had even captured the abbot of St Gall and in response they were excommunicated by the Bishop of Constance.

However, while the Bund expanded the Austrians used the peace to regain their strength. On 11 September 1406 an association of nobles formed a knightly order known as the Order of St. George's Shield to oppose the rebellious commoners of the Bund. The order besieged the Bund city of Bregenz in 1407. On 13 January 1408 Bund troops marched against the Order and Austrian troops outside the city. The attack was a disaster for the Bund, when their troops were defeated and driven back from the walls. Following the defeat Appenzell was unable to hold the Bund together. The city of St. Gallen and the canton of Schwyz each paid off the Austrians to avoid an attack, and the Bund was dissolved by King Rupert on 4 April 1408.

As part of the peace treaty, the abbot gave up his ownership of Appenzell, but was still owned certain taxes. However, it wasn't until 1410 that the area was at peace. In 1411, Appenzell signed a defensive treaty with the entire Swiss Confederation (except Bern), which strengthened their independence from the abbot, joining the Confederation as an "associate member" (it wouldn't become a full member until 1513).

== Conclusion ==
In the following years, Appenzell refused to pay the taxes that they owed the Abbey of St. Gall. In 1421, the Confederation supported the abbot over the matter of these taxes, and multiple imperial bans were imposed on Appenzell to try to force them to pay. When these were unsuccessful, in 1426 they were placed under an interdict, Frederick VII, Count of Toggenburg, supported by the Order of St. George's Shield marched into Appenzell. On 2 December 1428 they encountered and defeated the Appenzell army behind a heavy fortification (known as a letzi) on the field between Gossau and Herisau. Following the battle, in 1429 Appenzell was forced to repay the owed taxes but was granted freedom from the obligations in the future. This treaty represented the end of Appenzell's last financial tie to the Abbey of St. Gall, and a movement towards closer relationship with the Swiss Confederation.
