= Stoss Pass =

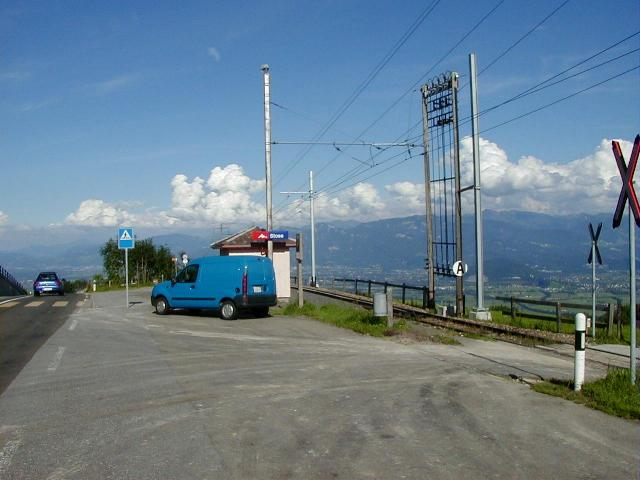
- Stoss Pass
- Interactive map of Stoss Pass
- Elevation: 942 metres (3,091 ft)

Third Approach
- Location: Switzerland
- Range: Alps
- Coordinates: 47°21′39″N 9°29′42″E

Stoss Pass (el. 942 m.) is a mountain pass between the cantons of Appenzell Innerrhoden and Appenzell Ausserrhoden in Switzerland.

== History ==
On June 17, 1405, during the Appenzell Wars, there was a battle on the pass between 400 soldiers from Appenzell and 1200 Habsburg and abbatial soldiers. The Appenzellers were victorious and thereby won their independence from the Abbey of Saint Gall. There is a monument on the site.

== See also ==
- List of highest paved roads in Europe
- List of mountain passes
