= Altstätten =

- Municipality
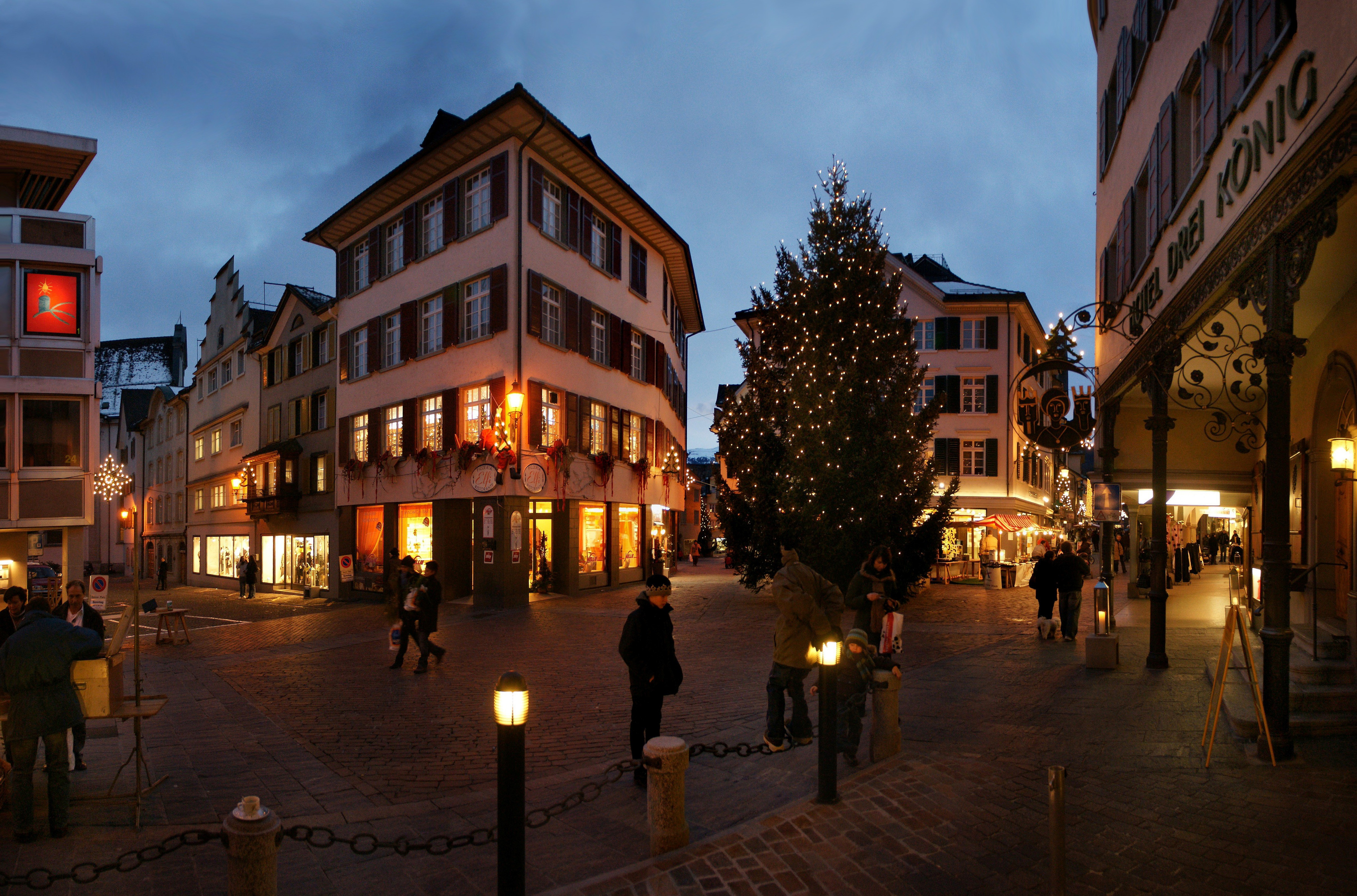

- Flag Coat of arms
- Location of Altstätten
- Location within Switzerland Location within Canton of St. Gallen
- Coordinates: 47°23′N 9°33′E
- Country: Switzerland
- Canton: St. Gallen
- District: Rheintal

Government
  - Executive: Stadtrat with 7 members
  - Mayor: Stadtpräsident (list); Ruedi Mattle Ind. (as of March 2014)
  - Parliament: none (Bürgerversammlung)

Area
  - Total: 39.46 km^{2} (15.24 sq mi)
- Elevation (Cross of Rorschacher- and Churerstrasse)): 455 m (1,493 ft)

Population (December 2020)
  - Total: 11,938
  - Density: 302.5/km^{2} (783.6/sq mi)
- Demonym: German: Altstätter(in)
- Time zone: UTC+01:00 (CET)
  - Summer (DST): UTC+02:00 (CEST)
- Postal code: 9450
- SFOS number: 3251
- ISO 3166 code: CH-SG
- Localities: Lüchingen, Hueb, Unter-Kobelwies, Kornberg, Gätziberg, Warmesberg, Hinterforst Lienz, Plona
- Surrounded by: Eichberg, Feldkirch (AT-8), Gais (AR), Marbach, Oberegg (AI), Oberriet, Ruggell (LI), Rüte (AI), Rüthi, Sennwald, Trogen (AR)
- Website: www.altstaetten.ch

Altstätten is a historic rural town and a municipality in the Rhine Valley district, in the canton of St. Gallen in Switzerland. It is about 5 kilometres (3.1 mi) west of the Alpine Rhine in the flat and wide St. Gall Rhine Valley, which also designates the border with Austria.

== Overview ==
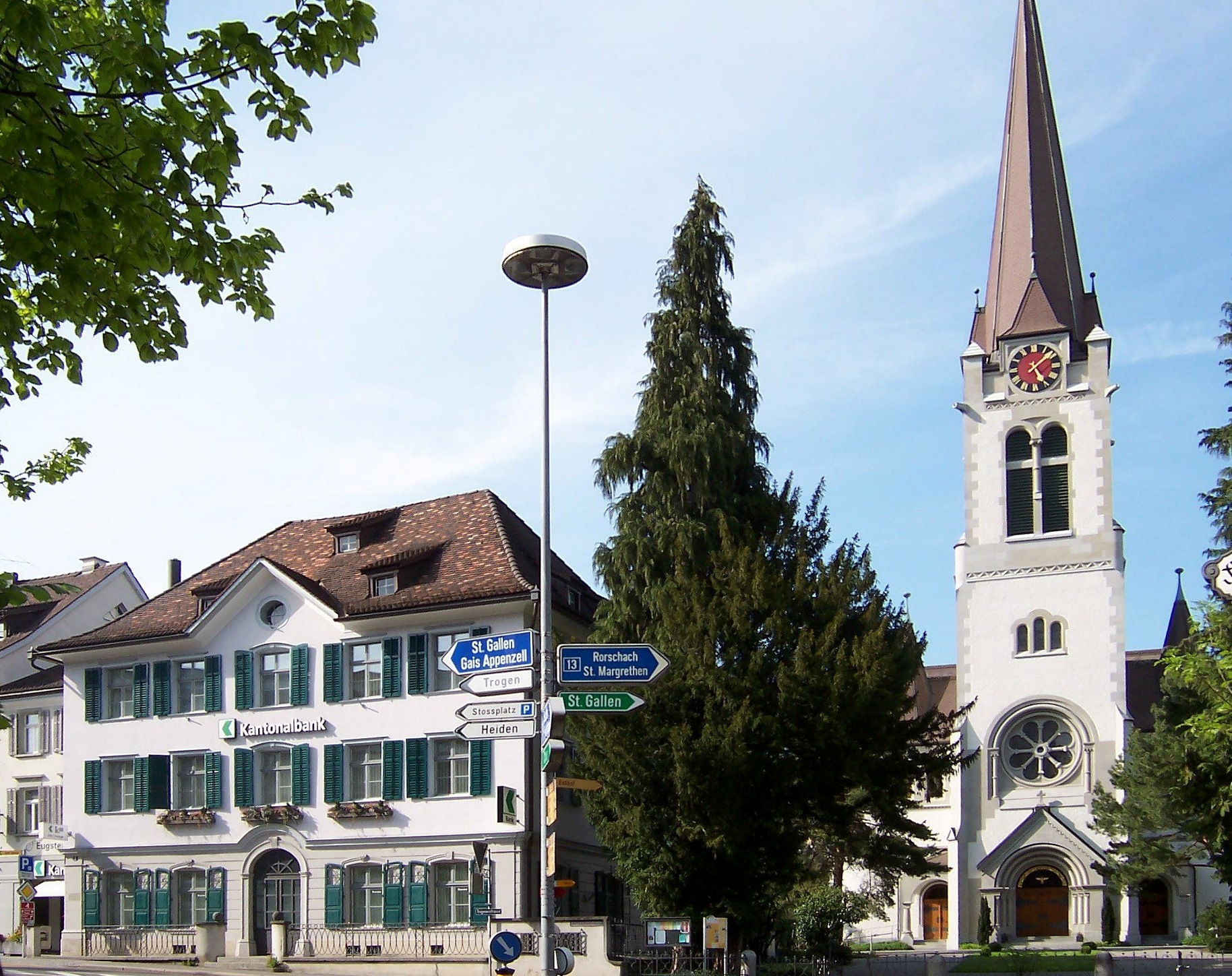
Näff house and Altstätten church

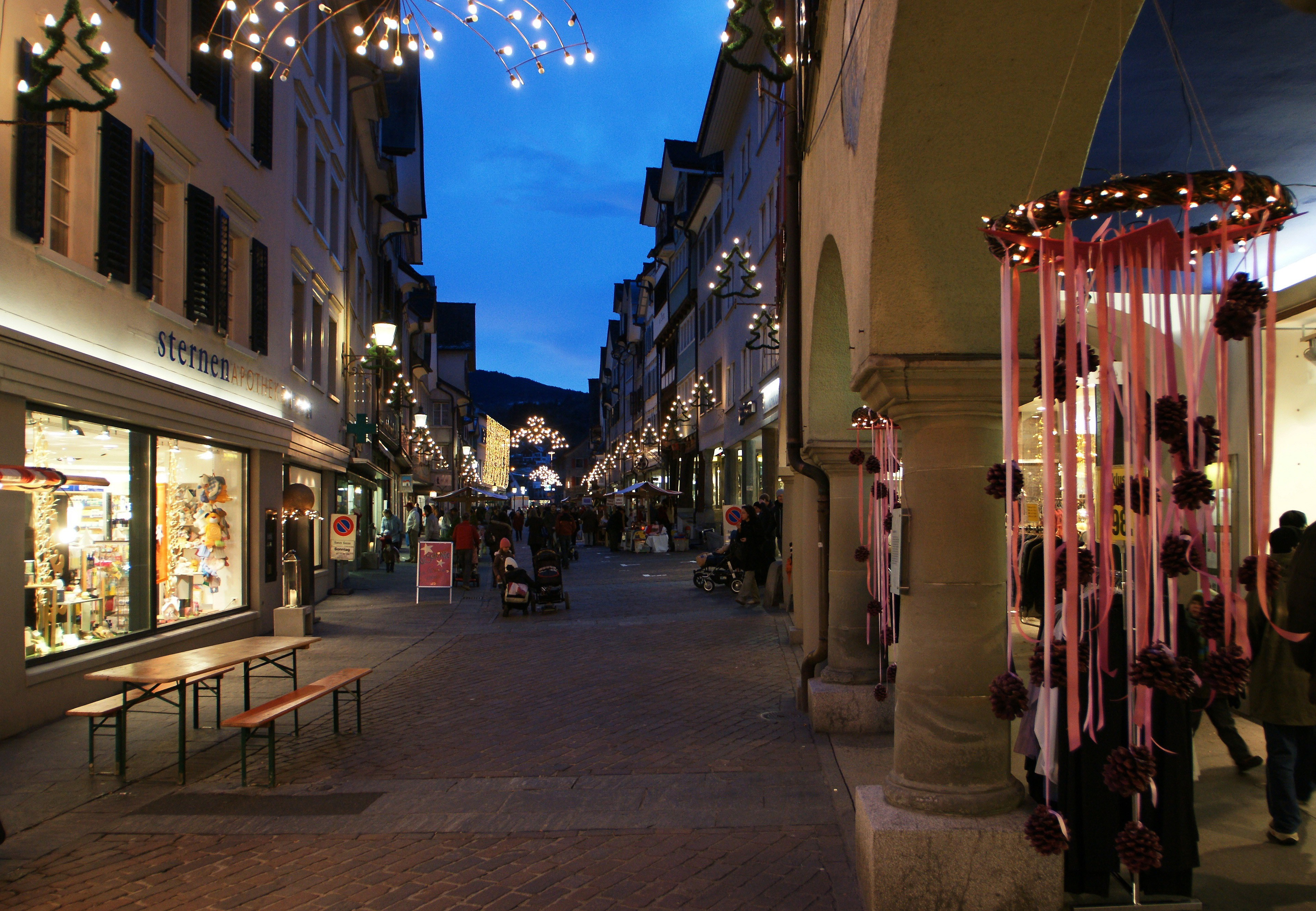
Altstätten in December 2008

The town consists of the following tracts: Alter Zoll, Altstätten, Bächis, Baumert, Bieser, Büeberg, Bühl, Bühl (Gätziberg), Bühl bei Hinterforst, Burgfeld, Bürglen, Burst, Domishäuser, Fidern, Gätziberg, Gfell, Hoher Kasten, Hub, Kornberg, Krans, Kreuzstrasse, Lithen, Lienz (exclave), Lüchingen, Mariahilf (monastery), Oberbüchel, Plona, Riet, Rosenhaus, Ruppen, Strick, Unterlitten, Warmesberg, Weidest und Ziel.

Altstätten is situated between the town of St. Margrethen and the town of Buchs/SG, near to the border of Austria, at the foot of the Alpstein-Mountains. In Altstätten has the start of the rack-and-pinion railway line of the Appenzeller Trams to Gais.

An electric tramway served the town from 1897 until 1973, operated by the Rheintaler Vekehrsbetriebe, which also operated trolleybuses from 1940 to 1977, on a route to Berneck. Altstätten now operates a bus transport network, RTB.

Supra-regional popularity was attained by Altstätten by its long and upscale Shrove-Tuesday tradition (carnival). Each January and February performances are held by the Röllelibutzen-club, founded in 1919, as well as many of the town's and region's Youth Music Societies. A highlight is the international parade, which attracts over 30'000 spectators from all of Switzerland.

== History ==
Altstätten is first mentioned in 853 as Altsteti.

== Coat of arms ==
The blazon of the municipal coat of arms is Or a bear passant Sable langued, armed and in his virility Gules and in chief a Mullet of Five of the last.

== Geography ==
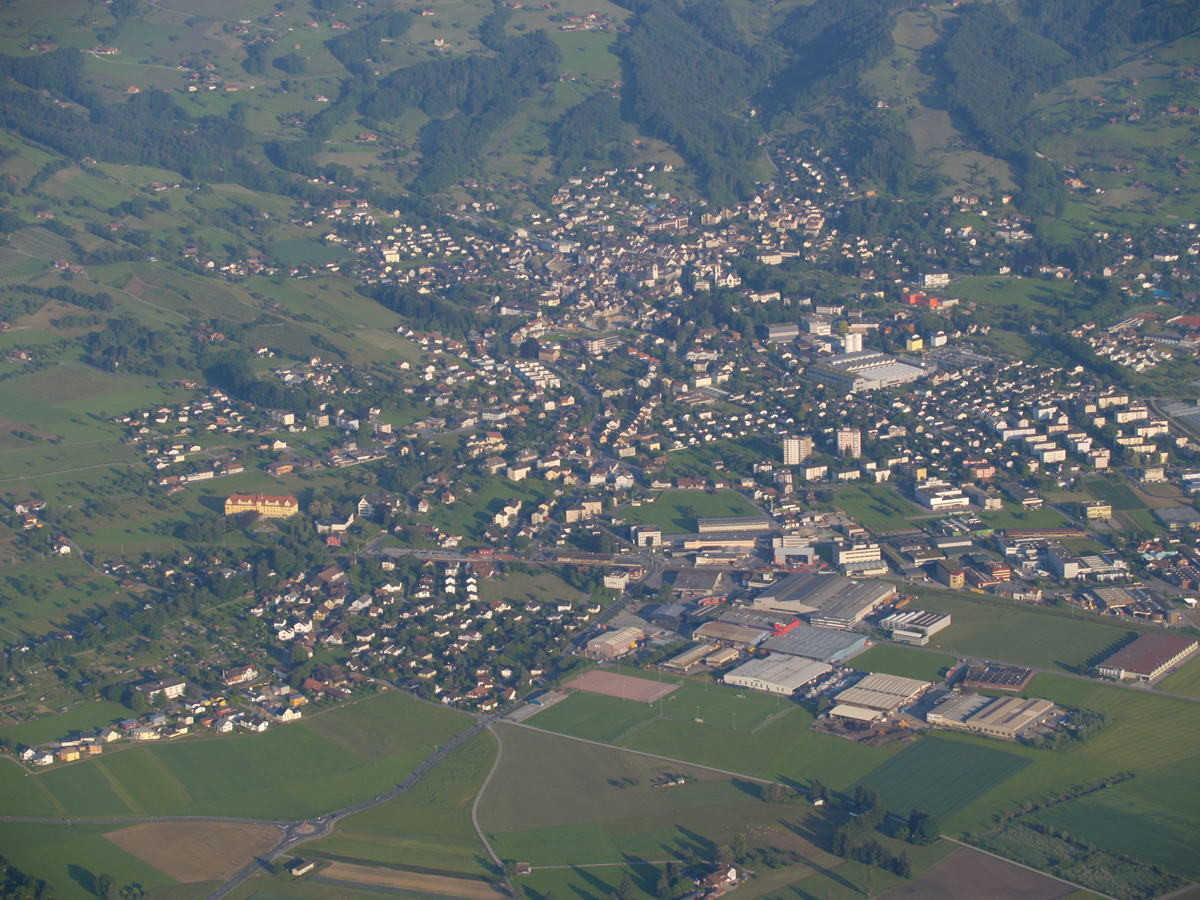
Aerial view of Altstätten

Aerial view from 100 m by Walter Mittelholzer (1922)

Altstätten has an area, as of 2006, of 39.5 km^{2} (15.3 sq mi). Of this area, 63.3% is used for agricultural purposes, while 21.1% is forested. Of the rest of the land, 12.7% is settled (buildings or roads) and the remainder (2.9%) is non-productive (rivers or lakes).

The municipality is the capital of the Rheintal Wahlkreis and formerly the capital of the Oberrheintal district. The traditional farming city is located on the western side of the Rhine river between the Appenzell hill country.

== Demographics ==
Altstätten has a population (as of 31 December 2020) of 11,938. As of 2007, about 21.5% of the population was made up of foreign nationals. Of the foreign population, (as of 2000), 175 are from Germany, 228 are from Italy, 1108 are from ex-Yugoslavia, 143 are from Austria, 82 are from Turkey, and 316 are from another country. Over the last 10 years the population has grown at a rate of 3.5%. Most of the population (as of 2000) speaks German (89.0%), with Albanian being second most common ( 3.1%) and Serbo-Croatian being third ( 2.7%). Of the Swiss national languages (as of 2000), 9,243 speak German, 17 people speak French, 172 people speak Italian, and 22 people speak Romansh.

The age distribution, as of 2000, in Altstätten is; 1,296 children or 12.5% of the population are between 0 and 9 years old and 1,438 teenagers or 13.9% are between 10 and 19. Of the adult population, 1,337 people or 12.9% of the population are between 20 and 29 years old. 1,614 people or 15.5% are between 30 and 39, 1,410 people or 13.6% are between 40 and 49, and 1,300 people or 12.5% are between 50 and 59. The senior population distribution is 884 people or 8.5% of the population are between 60 and 69 years old, 689 people or 6.6% are between 70 and 79, there are 350 people or 3.4% who are between 80 and 89, and there are 62 people or 0.6% who are between 90 and 99, and 1 person who is 100 or more.

In 2000 there were 1,323 persons (or 12.7% of the population) who were living alone in a private dwelling. There were 2,162 (or 20.8%) persons who were part of a couple (married or otherwise committed) without children, and 5,673 (or 54.6%) who were part of a couple with children. There were 575 (or 5.5%) people who lived in single parent home, while there are 68 persons who were adult children living with one or both parents, 37 persons who lived in a household made up of relatives, 49 who lived household made up of unrelated persons, and 494 who are either institutionalized or live in another type of collective housing.

In the 2007 federal election the most popular party was the SVP which received 41.5% of the vote. The next three most popular parties were the CVP (28%), the SP (9.9%) and the FDP (9.4%).

In Altstätten about 64.4% of the population (between age 25–64) have completed either non-mandatory upper secondary education or additional higher education (either university or a Fachhochschule). Out of the total population in Altstätten, as of 2000, the highest education level completed by 2,532 people (24.4% of the population) was Primary, while 3,579 (34.5%) have completed Secondary, 905 (8.7%) have attended a Tertiary school, and 488 (4.7%) are not in school. The remainder did not answer this question.

The historical population is given in the following table:

year	population
1800	ca. 4,900
1850	6,492
1900	8,724
1950	8,603
2000	10,381

== Religion ==
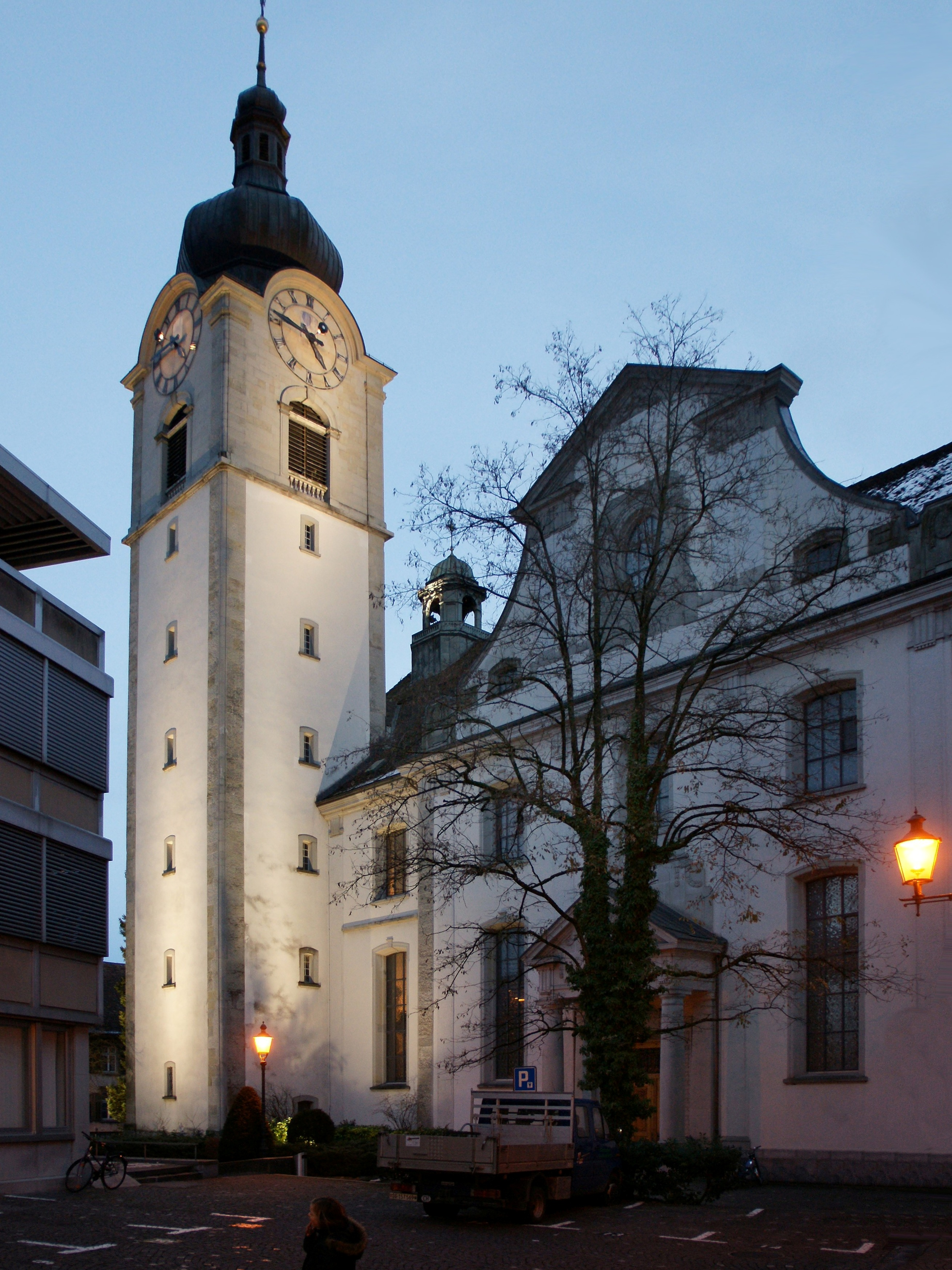
Roman Catholic church of St. Nicholas

From the 2000 census, 6,216 or 59.9% are Roman Catholic, while 2,050 or 19.7% belonged to the Swiss Reformed Church. Of the rest of the population, there are 12 individuals (or about 0.12% of the population) who belong to the Christian Catholic faith, there are 310 individuals (or about 2.99% of the population) who belong to the Orthodox Church, and there are 152 individuals (or about 1.46% of the population) who belong to another Christian church. There are 3 individuals (or about 0.03% of the population) who are Jewish, and 762 (or about 7.34% of the population) who are Islamic. There are 74 individuals (or about 0.71% of the population) who belong to another church (not listed on the census), 468 (or about 4.51% of the population) belong to no church, are agnostic or atheist, and 334 individuals (or about 3.22% of the population) did not answer the question.

== Economy ==
As of 2007, Altstätten had an unemployment rate of 2.17%. As of 2005, there were 399 people employed in the primary economic sector and about 147 businesses involved in this sector. 2,675 people are employed in the secondary sector and there are 152 businesses in this sector. 3,313 people are employed in the tertiary sector, with 426 businesses in this sector.

As of October 2009 the average unemployment rate was 4.0%. There were 726 businesses in the municipality of which 148 were involved in the secondary sector of the economy while 443 were involved in the third.

As of 2000 there were 3,302 residents who worked in the municipality, while 2,025 residents worked outside Altstätten and 3,269 people commuted into the municipality for work.

== Sights ==
The village of Altstätten as well as a concentration of castles, which is known as the Schlosslandschaft Ober/Unterrheintal and spans Altstätten, Balgach, Berneck and Marbach, is designated as part of the Inventory of Swiss Heritage Sites.

== Sport ==
In the 1970s, Altstätten's football club, FC Altstätten founded in 1945, was at national league B level, and played in the premiership. Today the club plays in the 2. Liga.

== Transport ==
Altstätten has two train stations: Altstätten Stadt, the eastern terminus of the Altstätten–Gais railway, and Altstätten SG, an intermediate stop on the Chur–Rorschach line with frequent local and long-distance service.

== Notable people ==
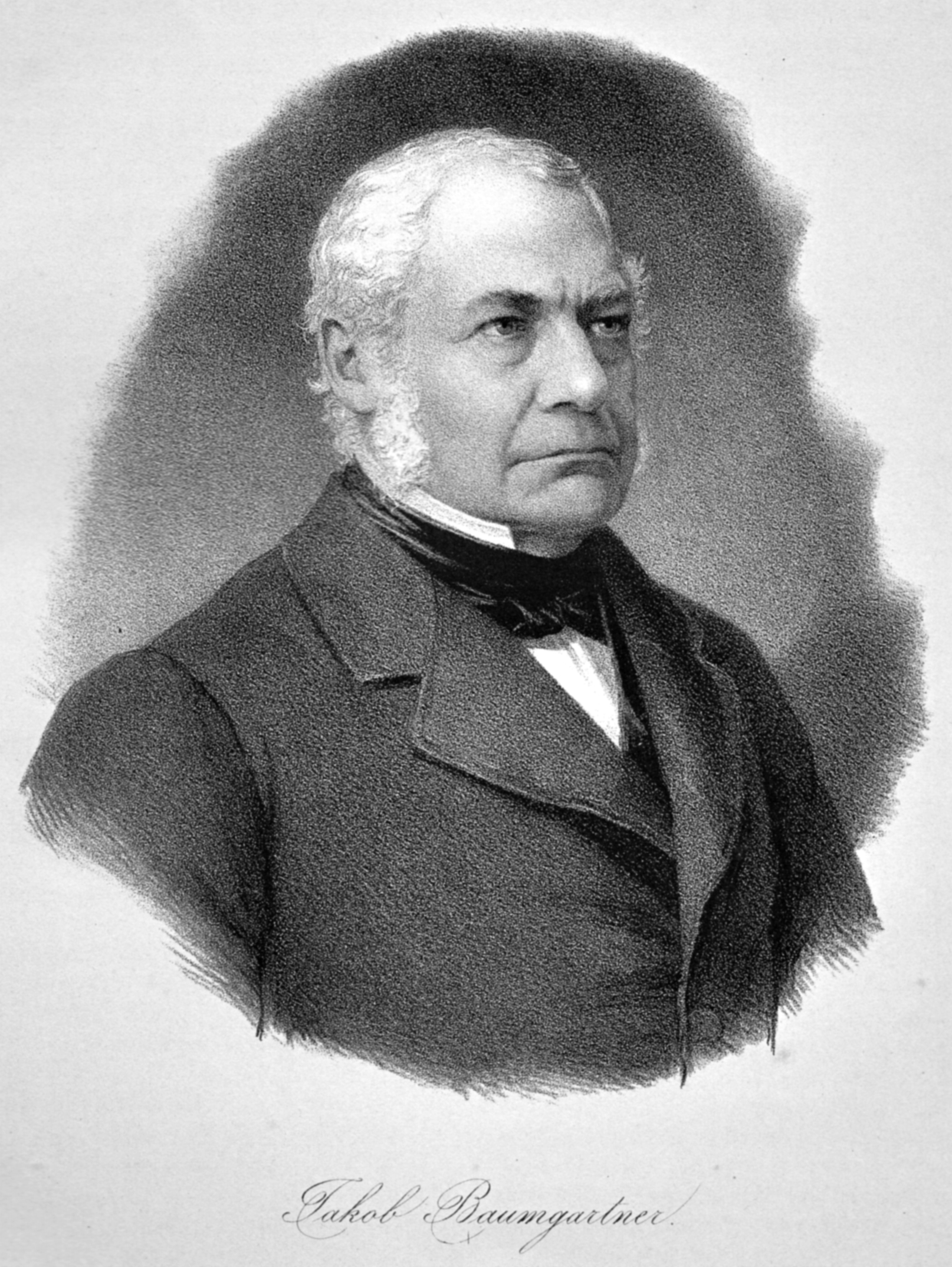
Gallus Jakob Baumgartner

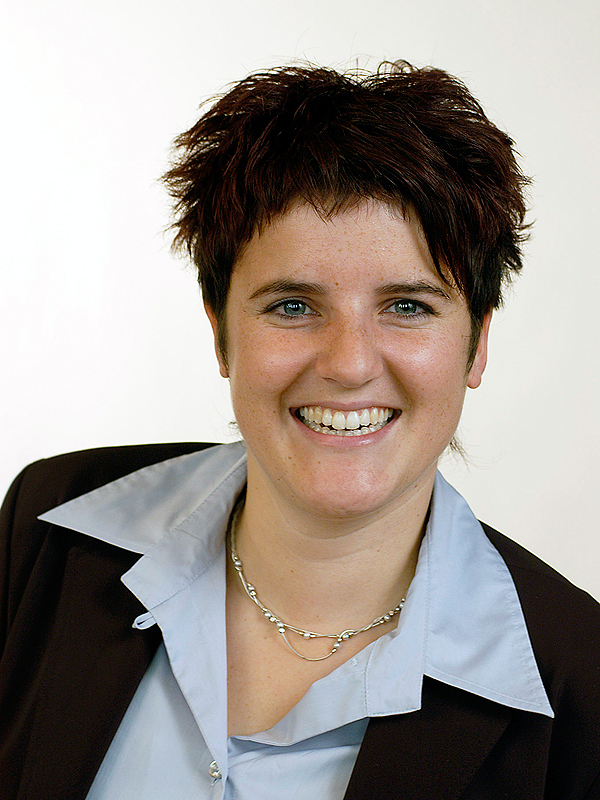
Jasmin Hutter

18th century

- Johann Jakob Haltiner (1728 in Altstätten – 1800) church architect
- Johann Ludwig Ambühl (1750 – 1800 in Altstätten) educationalist and knight of the pen, promoter and patron of Ulrich Bräker
- Gallus Jacob Baumgartner (1797 in Altstätten – 1869) a Swiss statesman and prominent federalist

19th century

- Wilhelm Matthias Naeff (1802 in Altstätten – 1881) a Swiss politician and one of the seven initial members of the Swiss Federal Council (1848–1875)
- Carl Eugen Keel (1885 in Altstätten – 1961) a Swiss expressionistic painter, principally known for his woodcuts
- Ferdinand Gehr (1896 – 1996 in Altstätten) a Swiss painter

20th century

- Paul Baumgartner (1903 in Altstätten – 1976) a Swiss pianist
- Roland Rino Büchel (born 1965), Swiss businessman and politician
- Jakob Freund (born 1946 in Altstätten) politician and Swiss folk-musician
- Gardi Hutter (born 1953 in Altstätten) a Swiss clown, comedian, author, actress and Cabaret artist
- Marcel Gisler (born 1960) a Swiss film director and screenwriter
- Jasmin Hutter (born 1978 in Altstätten) a Swiss politician, serves on the National Council of Switzerland

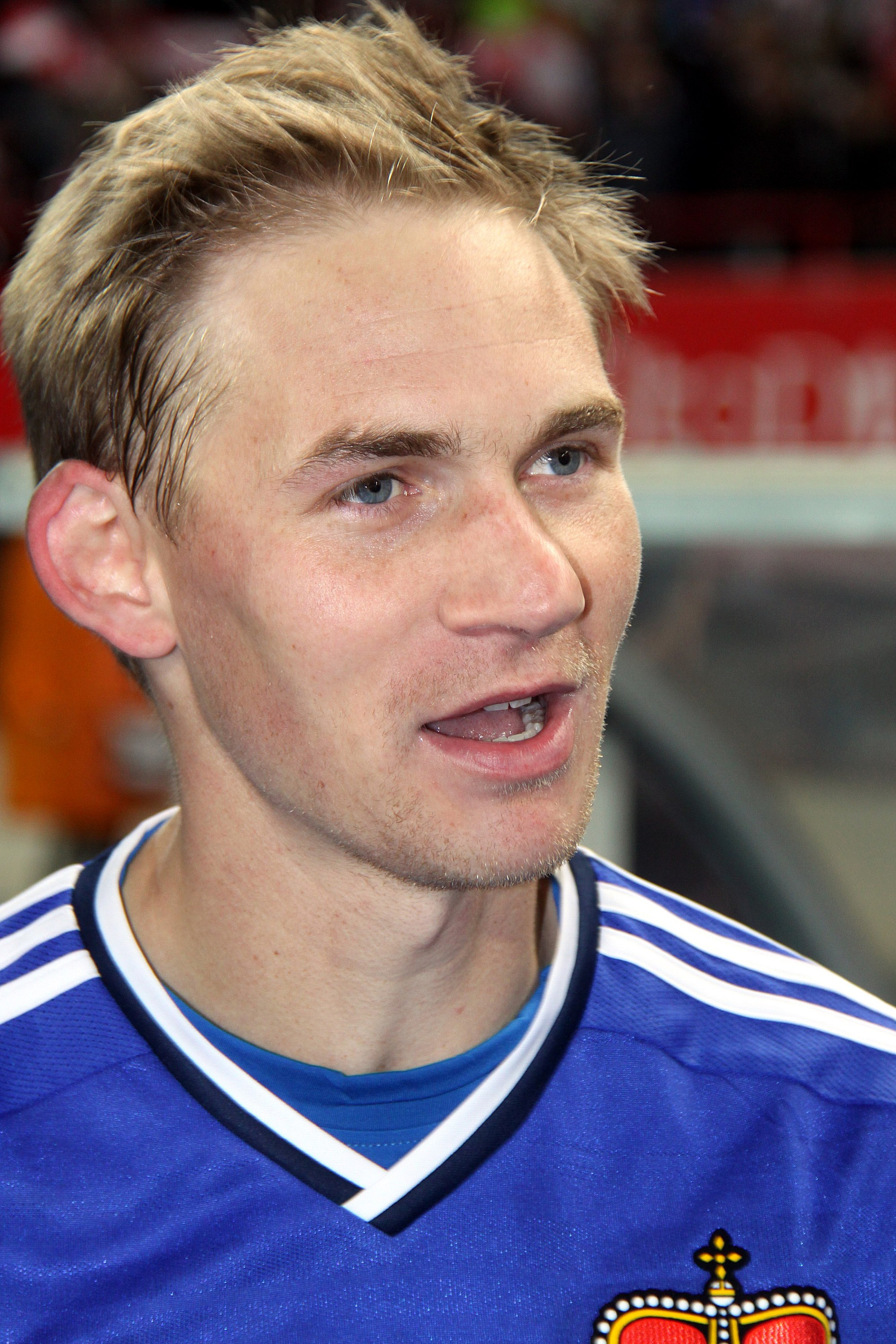
Martin Rechsteiner, 2015

Sport

- Yvonne Elkuch (born 1968 in Altstätten) a Liechtenstein cyclist, competed in the 1988 and 1992 Summer Olympics
- Nagwa El Desouki (born 1971 in Altstätten) a Swiss Olympic slalom canoer
- Lars Burgsmüller (born 1975) a former German tennis player, lives in Altstätten
- Rainer Schüttler (born 1976) a retired German professional tennis player, lives in Altstätten
- Ivo Heuberger (born 1976 in Altstätten) a retired tennis player who represented Switzerland at the Davis Cup
- Remo Lütolf (born 1980 in Altstätten) a Swiss breaststroke swimmer, competed in the 2000 and 2004 Summer Olympics
- Marc Benz (born 1982 in Altstätten) a Swiss racing driver
- Daniela Casanova (born 1984 in Altstätten) a Swiss former professional tennis player
- Myriam Casanova (born 1985 in Altstätten) a Swiss former professional female tennis player
- Stefan Frei (born 1986 in Altstätten) a Swiss football goalkeeper, has played all his professional career in Major League Soccer
- Martin Rechsteiner (born 1989 in Altstätten) a Liechtensteiner international footballer, 150 club caps and 39 for Liechtenstein
- Orhan Ademi (born 1991 in Altstätten) a Swiss footballer, over 200 club caps
- Gabriel Lüchinger (born 1992 in Altstätten) a Swiss footballer, about 175 club caps
