= Gais railway station =

Train station in the canton of Appenzell Ausserrhoden, Switzerland

Gais
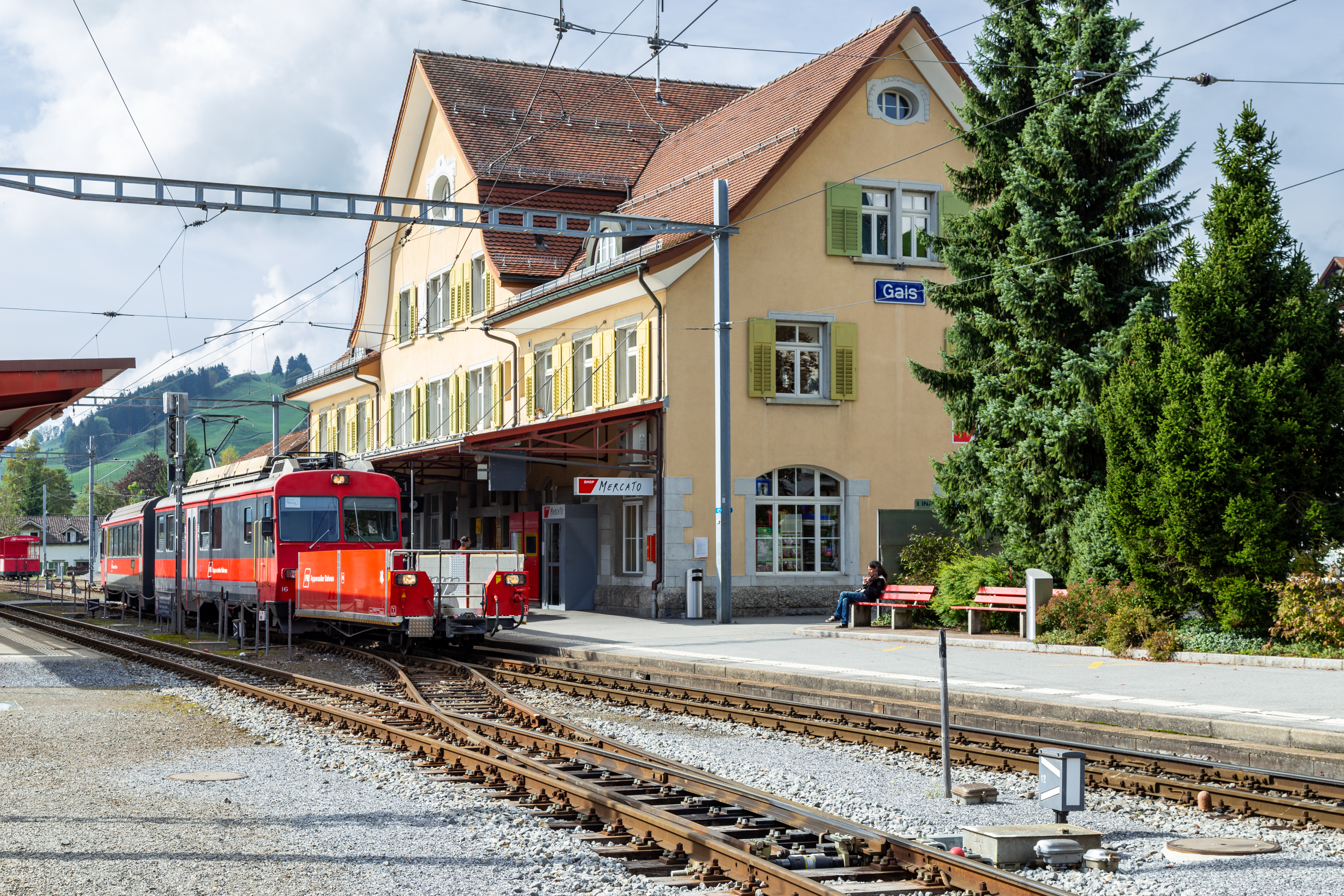
- The station building in 2014

General information
- Location: Gais, Appenzell Ausserrhoden; Switzerland
- Coordinates: 47°21′39″N 9°27′04″E
- Elevation: 915 m (3,002 ft)
- Owner: Appenzell Railways
- Lines: Altstätten–Gais line; Appenzell–St. Gallen–Trogen line
- Distance: 7.7 km (4.8 mi) from Altstätten Stadt; 13.9 km (8.6 mi) from St. Gallen
- Platforms: 1 island platform; 1 side platform
- Tracks: 3
- Train operators: Appenzell Railways

Other information
- Fare zone: 244 and 245 (Tarifverbund Ostwind)

Services
Preceding station	St. Gallen S-Bahn	Following station
Sammelplatz towards Appenzell	S20	Bühler towards Trogen
Sammelplatz towards Appenzell	S21	Zweibrücken towards Trogen
Terminus	S24	Hebrig towards Altstätten Stadt
Location
- Location within Switzerland Location within Canton of Appenzell Ausserrhoden

Gais railway station (German: Bahnhof Gais) is a railway station in the municipality of Gais, in the Swiss canton of Appenzell Ausserrhoden. It is located at the junction of the 1,000 mm (3 ft 3 3/8 in) metre gauge Appenzell–St. Gallen–Trogen and Altstätten–Gais lines of Appenzell Railways.

== Services ==
As of the December 2020 timetable change, the following services stop at Gais:

- St. Gallen S-Bahn:
  - S20: rush-hour service between Trogen and Appenzell, via St. Gallen (only calls at Niederteufen, Teufen AR and Bühler between Gais and St. Gallen).
  - S21: half-hourly service between Appenzell and Trogen, via St. Gallen.
  - S24: hourly service to Altstätten Stadt.

Scheduled transfers between the S21 and S24 enable hourly service from Altstätten Stadt to Appenzell and St. Gallen and vice versa.

== See also ==
- Rail transport in Switzerland
