= Altstätten Stadt railway station =

Train station in Switzerland

Altstätten Stadt
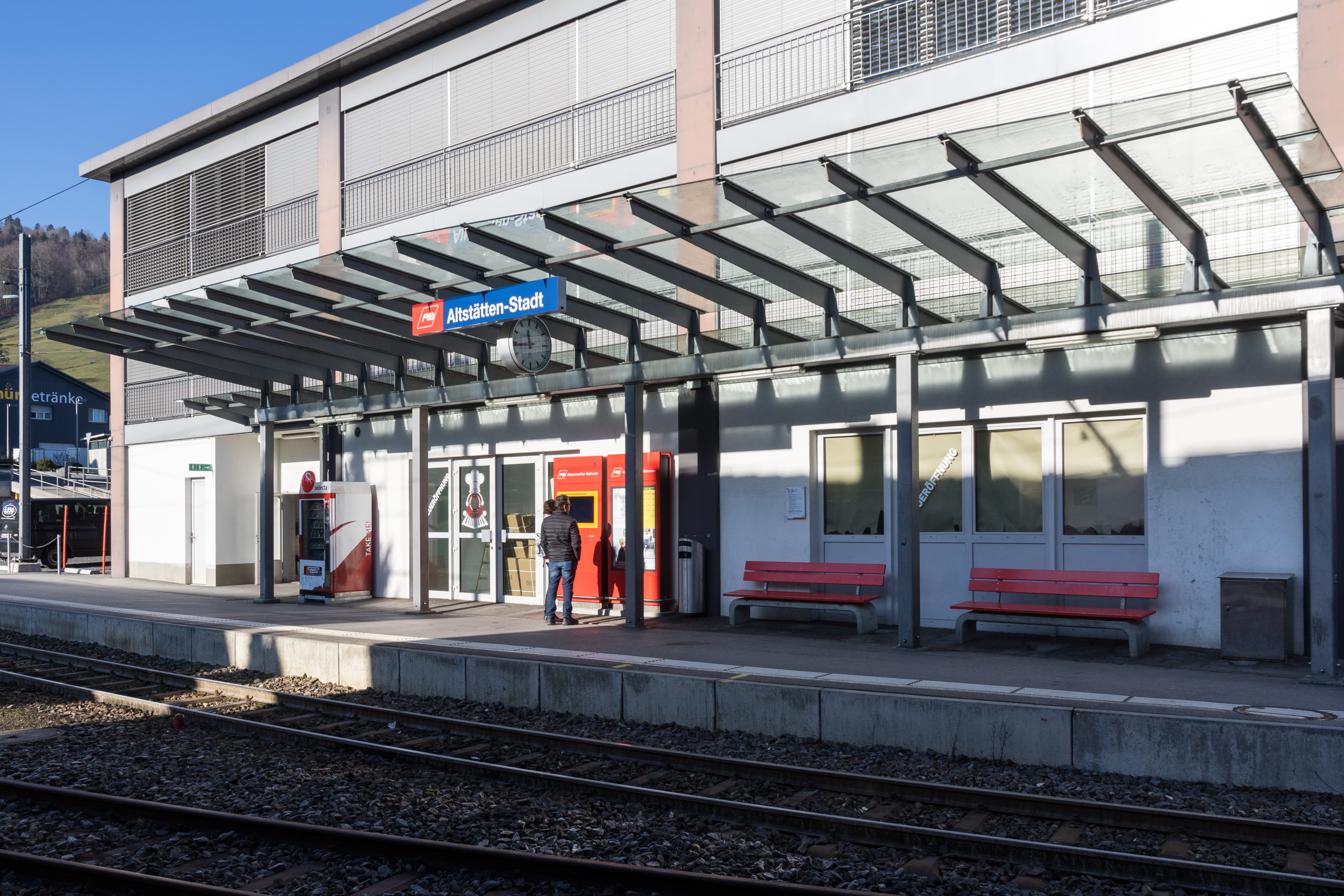
- The station building and platforms in 2018

General information
- Location: Altstätten; Switzerland
- Coordinates: 47°22′36.9″N 9°32′15.3″E
- Owner: AB (Appenzeller Bahnen)
- Operator: AB
- Line: Altstätten–Gais line
- Platforms: 1
- Tracks: 2
- Train operators: AB
- Connections
- Bus: Rheintalbus 227, 300, 301 (connections with Altstätten SG, Bahnhof over the latter two lines) 333

Construction
- Structure type: at-grade
- Depth: 0
- Platform levels: 1

Other information
- Fare zone: Ostwind (fare network): 232

Services
Preceding station	St. Gallen S-Bahn	Following station
Alter Zoll towards Gais	S24	Terminus
Location
- Location within Switzerland Location within Canton of St. Gallen

Altstätten Stadt railway station (German: Bahnhof Altstätten Stadt) is a railway station in Altstätten, in the Swiss canton of St. Gallen. It is the eastern terminus of the 1,000 mm (3 ft 3 3/8 in) metre gauge Altstätten–Gais line and is served by local trains only.

== Connections ==
The station is located near the center of the town and ca. 1.6 km (0.99 mi) to the west of Altstätten SG railway station, which is an intermediate stop on the 1,435 mm (4 ft 8 1/2 in) standard gauge Chur–Rorschach line with additional local and long-distance services. The two stations are linked by bus lines 300 and 301 of Rheintalbus.

== Services ==
Altstätten Stadt is served by the S24 of the St. Gallen S-Bahn:

- S24: hourly service to Gais.
