= Heerbrugg =

Village in St. Gallen, Switzerland

- Village
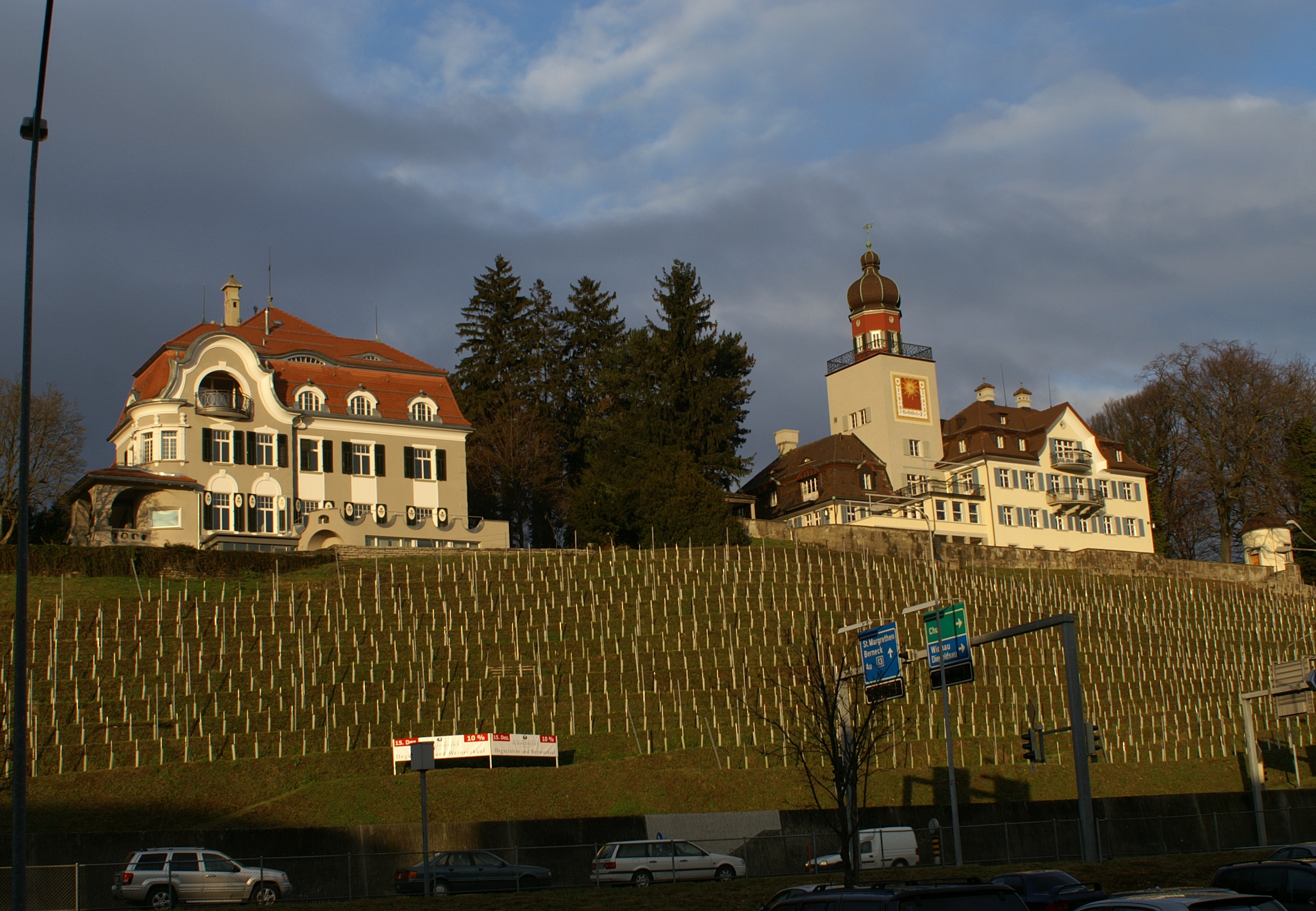
- Heerbrugg Castle

- Location within Switzerland
- Coordinates: 47.4117°N 9.6265°E
- Country: Switzerland
- Canton: St. Gallen
- District: Rheintal
- Municipalities: Au, Balgach, Berneck, Widnau

Population (1990)
  - Total: 2,782

Heerbrugg is a village in the Rheintal region of the canton of St. Gallen, Switzerland, that lies in the municipalities of Au, Balgach, Berneck and Widnau. It is an industrial, transport and service center of the central Rhine Valley (Mittelrheintal).

== History ==
Heerbrugg is first mentioned in 1303 as Herbrugge. The fortress of Hêrburch, which Abbot Ulrich III of St. Gallen built in the Rhine Valley around 1078, cannot be located. In 1810 there were eight houses near the castle.

From before 1598 until 1727 Heerbrugg Castle was a country seat of the Schobinger family of St. Gallen. It was rebuilt after a fire in 1774, and enlarged and given a tower in 1910. From 1839 to 1871 it belonged to the educator and politician Karl Völker, who ran a boarding school, an experimental farm and, from 1858, a brickworks there. In 1867–1871 Jakob Schmidheiny took over the castle estate and the brickworks, and there he laid the foundation of his family's prominence.

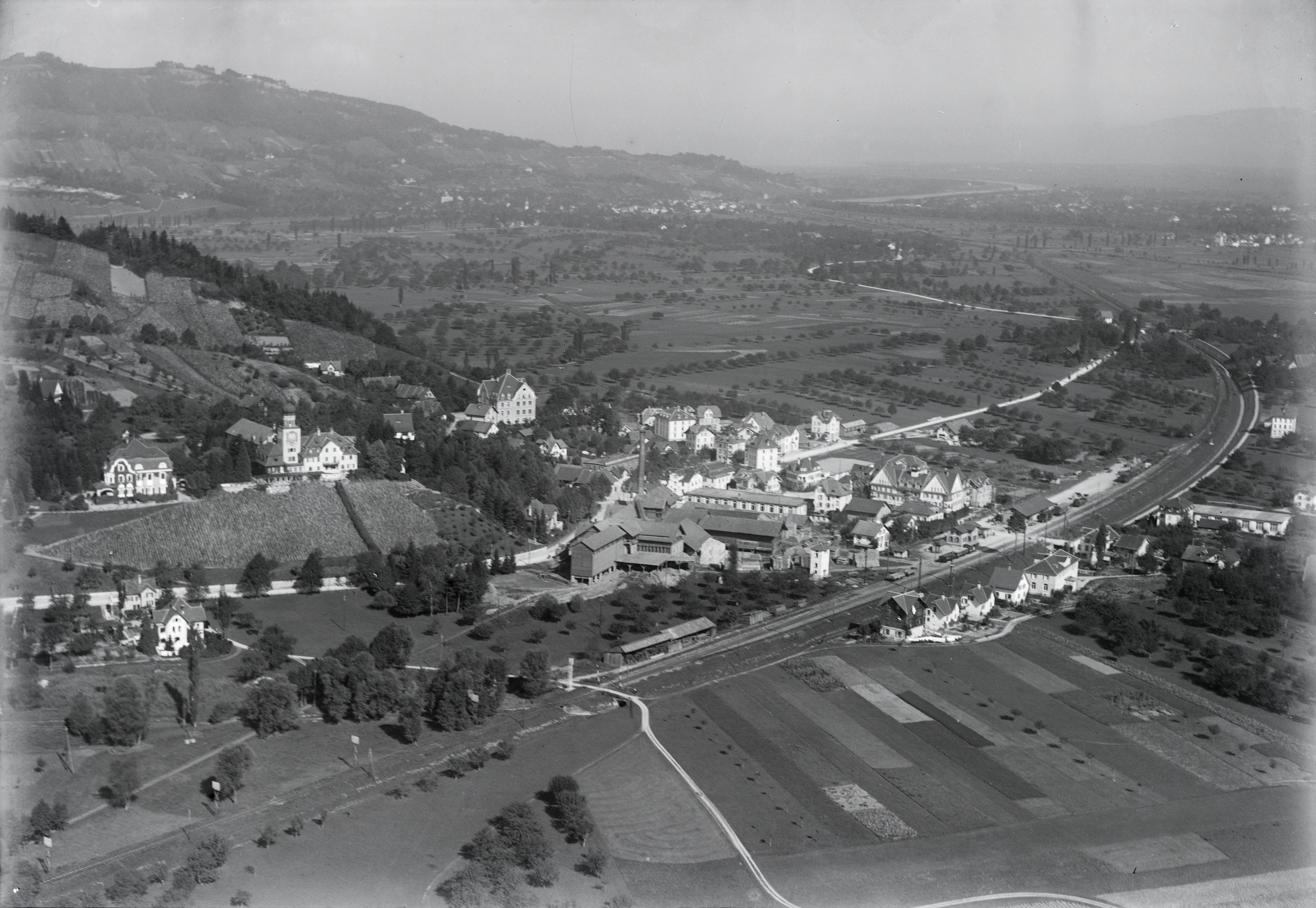
Heerbrugg from the air in 1923, with the castle on the slope (left), the Schmidheiny brickworks and the railway (photograph by Walter Mittelholzer)

The opening of the Rhine Valley railway (Rheintalbahn) in 1858 made Heerbrugg a transport center. Tramways to Berneck and Altstätten were built in 1897, and to Diepoldsau in 1915; bus services began in 1940. From 1880 the settlement in the valley grew between the hillside and the railway station; from 1902 to 1914 its buildings, infrastructure and planning were shaped to a large extent by the architect Johann Labonté. The main sources of income were the brickworks (the population had a high proportion of Italians) and the embroidery industry. From 1921 Heinrich Wild and Jakob Schmidheiny junior built up an optical works (since 1989 Leica AG).

The growth of the population led to the founding of a school and a school community (Schulgemeinde) in 1906 and to the formation of a Catholic chapel association (Kapellgenossenschaft) in 1912, and to the building of the Catholic church (1943) and the Protestant church (1964). A Catholic parish (Kirchgemeinde) has existed since 1954. Heerbrugg has had a cantonal school (Kantonsschule) since 1975.

Heerbrugg had 500 inhabitants in 1900 (270 in Au and 230 in Balgach), 865 in 1941 (606 and 259), 1,514 in 1960 (1,194 and 320) and 2,782 in 1990 (2,613 and 169).

== Bibliography ==
- M. Kaiser, "Johann Labonté, ein Rheintaler Jugendstil-Architekt", in Unser Rheintal 38, 1981, 115–125
- D. Stender (ed.), Industriekultur am Bodensee, 1992, 63, 70
- W. Frei et al., Au und Heerbrugg seit 1900, 1992
- L. Zoller, 50 Jahre Bruder-Klausen-Kirche Heerbrugg, 1993
