= Schmidheiny family =

Schmidheiny family Schmidheini
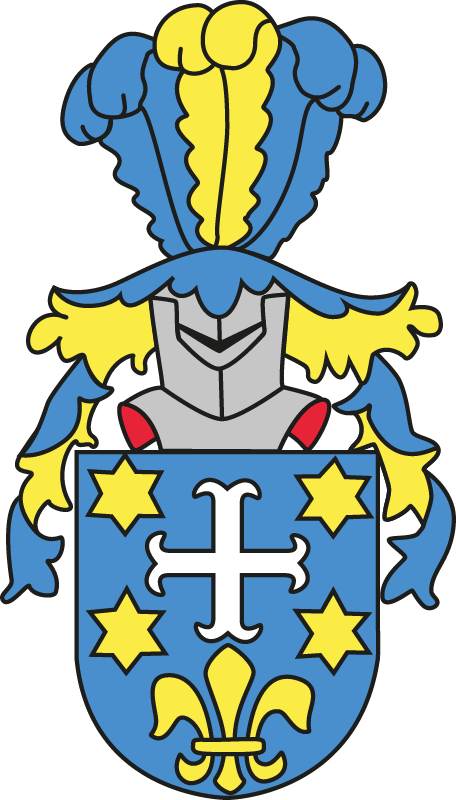

The Schmidheiny family (/ˈʃmɪdhaɪni/ SHMID-hy-nee) is a Swiss industrial and political family originally from Balgach, St. Gallen in Eastern Switzerland. The fortune was made through diversification in only two to three generations during the mid-19th and early 20th century by Jacob Schmidheiny through the silk manufacturing (until 1867) and then building materials such as brick and concrete (primarily Eternit and Holcim).

== Members ==
- Jacob Schmidheiny (1838–1905) (m.) Elise Kaufmann
  - Ernst Schmidheiny I. (1871–1935) (m.) Vera Kuster
    - Vera Lydia Schmidheiny (1897–1981)
    - Marie-Louise Schmidheiny (1900–1981)
    - Ernst Schmidheiny II (1902–1985)
    - Max Schmidheiny (1908–1991) (m.) Adda Marietta Scherrer
      - Thomas Schmidheiny (born 1945)
      - Stephan Schmidheiny (born 1947)
      - Alexander Schmidheiny (1951–1992)
  - Jacob Schmidheiny II. (1875–1955) (m.) Fanny Alder
    - Nelly-Helen Schmidheiny
    - Peter Schmidheiny (1908–2001)
    - Marianne Schmidheiny
    - Ursula Schmidheiny
