= Gebhard Rohner =

Swiss politician

Member of Cantonal Council of St. Gallen
- In office 1 May 1900 – 3 November 1908
- Constituency: Rheintal (district)

Personal details
- Born: Joseph Gebhard Rohner; 25 August 1836 Au, St. Gallen, Switzerland
- Died: 3 November 1908 (aged 72) Au, St. Gallen, Switzerland
- Party: Free Radical Liberals
- Spouse: Anna Maria Zoller (m. 1861)
- Relations: Albert Ziegler (great-grandson)
- Children: 12, including Anton
- Occupation: Businessman; merchant; mayor; politician

Joseph Gebhard Rohner (German: [ˈɡɛb.hɑrd ˈroʊnər]; 25 August 1836 - 3 November 1908) was a Swiss politician who served on the Cantonal Council of St. Gallen for three terms representing the Rheintal district from 1900 to 1908 (died during third term which would have ended in 1909). He was also a mayor of Au, Switzerland. Rohner was the father of Anton Rohner and great-grandfather of Albert Ziegler.
