= Jacob Schmidheiny =

Swiss industrialist and politician (1838–1905)

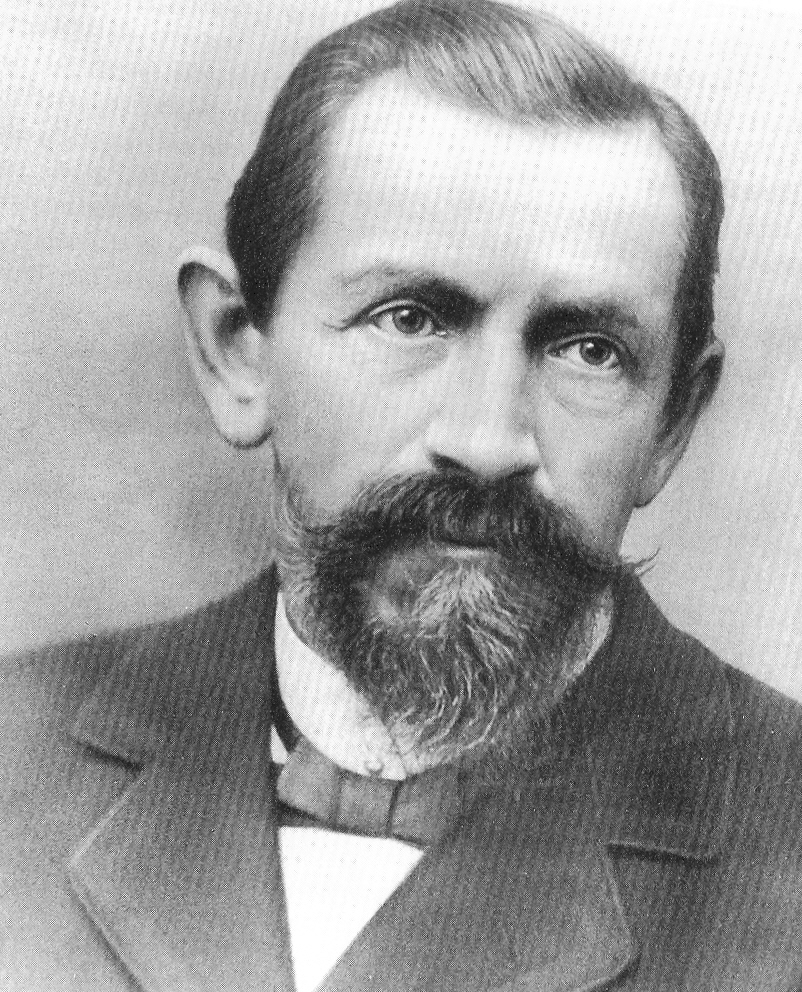
- Schmidheiny c. 1890s

Member of Cantonal Council of St. Gallen
- In office 1 May 1891 – 3 November 1905
- Constituency: Rheintal (district)

Personal details
- Born: Jakob Schmidheini; 25 June 1838 Balgach, Switzerland
- Died: 18 February 1905 (aged 66) St. Gallen, Switzerland
- Spouse: Elise Kaufmann (m. 1867)
- Children: 2
- Occupation: Businessman, industrialist, silk weaver

Jacob Schmidheiny (né Jakob Schmidheini; 25 June 1838 – 18 February 1905) was a Swiss industrialist and politician who served on the Cantonal Council of St. Gallen from 1891 to 1905. He was the patriarch of the Schmidheiny family, who is primarily known for their industrial activities such as Eternit and Holcim. He is the grandfather of Max Schmidheiny and great-grandfather of Stephan Schmidheiny and Thomas Schmidheiny.
