= Barbara Schellhammer =

German cultural philosopher and social scientist

Barbara Schellhammer (born 1977 in Munich) is a German cultural philosopher and social scientist. She lived, worked and researched in Canada for several years. Since 2019 she holds the chair for Intercultural Social Transformation and is head of the Center for Social and Development Studies at the Munich School of Philosophy.

== Biography ==
Barbara Schellhammer studied Social Work with a focus on systemic family therapy at the University of Applied Sciences in Munich. From 1998 till 2013 she lived and worked in Canada and taught in Victoria, BC, at the Royal Roads University (School of Peace and Conflict Studies). In 2005 and 2006, she conducted ethnographic field research while serving as a social worker in Inuit communities in the Northwest Territories (Inuvik, Ulukhaktok and Paulatuk). She earned a certificate as Professional Coach (Erickson College, Vancouver) and received a mediation certificate (Pulse Institute, Calgary).

In 2009, she finished her PhD at the Munich School of Philosophy (MSP). In her dissertation "Dichte Beschreibung in der Arktis. Clifford Geertz und die Kulturrevolution der Inuit in Nordkanada" she utilized Clifford Geertz’ Thick Description, building on her experiences as a social worker in the Canadian Arctic.

Also, in 2009 she became Professor for International and Intercultural Social Work at the CVJM-Hochschule Kassel. In 2013, she came back to the Munich School of Philosophy, to start her post-doc work while she served as Assistant Professor in Adult Education (later Intercultural Education). From 2017 until 2018 she served as Academic Director for Europe & Middle East for Jesuit Worldwide Learning .

She finished her post-doc work (Habilitation) in 2018 at the University of Hildesheim with her work on Fremdheitserfahrungen und die Sorge um sich selbst. Untersuchungen zur Entwicklung der Fremdheitsfähigkeit einer Person. In 2019 she became the first female Professor at the MSP with a research chair for Intercultural Social Transformation. At the same time, she became the director of the Center for Social and Development Studies at the MSP. Currently her main research interest lies in the area of anthropology, intercultural philosophy, the phenomenology of the alien, peace studies and conflict-transformation.

== Publications (selection) ==
- 2015: "Dichte Beschreibung" in der Arktis. Clifford Geertz und die Kulturrevolution der Inuit in Nordkanada. Bielefeld: transcript.
- 2017: Wie lernen Erwachsene (heute)? Eine transdisziplinäre Einführung in die Erwachsenenbildung. Weinheim: Beltz Juventa.
- 2017: The Philosophy of Self-Care, Individuation and Psychodrama. Exploring Creative Means to Encountering the "unknown Other" in Self. In: British Journal of Guidance & Counselling, Taylor & Francis 2018. .
- 2017: The Experience of the Other and the Premise of the Care for Self. Intercultural Education as "Umwendung". In: Meijers, Frans/Hermans, Hubert (ed.): The Dialogical Self Theory in Education. New York: Springer, 65–79.
- 2019: An Konflikten wachsen. Konflikt-Coaching und die Sorge um sich selbst. Weinheim: Beltz.
- 2019: Culture – A Life of Learning: Clifford Geertz und aktuelle gesellschaftliche Herausforderungen. Gmainer-Pranzl/Schellhammer (ed.), Verlag Peter Lang.
- 2021: Indigegogy: An Invitation to Learning in a Relational Way. Schellhammer/Wilson, Herder Verlag.
- 2022: Philosophie der Grenze. Schellhammer/Schützle (ed.), wbg Verlag.
- 2024: Sexuelle Selbstbestimmung bei Menschen mit kognitiven Einschränkungen? Kuhn/Renzikowski/Schellhammer (ed.), Nomos Verlag.
- 2024: Epistemic Injustice and Violence: Exploring Knowledge, Power, and Participation in Philosophy and Beyond. Schützle/Schellhammer/Yadav/Kather/Thomine (ed.), transcript Verlag.
- 2025: Kulturphilosophie, transcript (utb).
