= Ignatius Krekshino =

Russian Greek-Catholic priest (born 1956)

Father Ignatius Krekshino (Russian: Игнатий Крекшин, born in 1956) is a Russian Greek-Catholic priest and Father Superior.

== Biography ==
Krekshino graduated from the Department of Art and History Faculty of Moscow State University and the Moscow Orthodox Theological Seminary. On 5 November 1989 he was ordained to the priesthood by Bishop Gregory (Chirkov) of Mozhaisk.

He served as rector of the Nativity Bobreneva monastery. Krekshino was also a supporter of the introduction of the Russian language in the liturgy, and signed a Message from the 10 April 1994, calling for a discussion of the liturgical order. Prior to 1998, was secretary of the Commission for the canonization and a member of the Theological Commission of the Holy Synod. In 1998, the decision of the Holy Synod had granted a petition for dismissal of the rector of Nativity Bobreneva monastery due to deduction for health reasons. Since 1999 he has been a convert to Catholicism and has served in the Greek-Catholic Church of Saint Nicholas in Munich and after in the Catholic church of Saint Procopius in Tübingen. He graduated from Munich School of Philosophy.

== Works ==
- The Gospel of Luke with explanations. // Moscow Diocesan Gazette. Moscow, 1991. N 1. S. 38-43.
- The word after Vespers in the Cathedral of Vladimir May 21, 1991 // Orthodox community number 19.
- О наших публикациях, Предисл. к статье еп. Кассиана (Безобразова) "Принципы православного толкования слова Божия" // Альфа и Омега. М., 1994. №2 (АиО). стр. 28.
- In memory of Fr. Sergius Gakkel // Herald RHD. Paris: № 189. I. 2005.
- My memory of Alexander. The meeting, which continues / / Truth and the Life. 1/2005.

== Sources ==
Alexei Bukalov. Prayer of the seven gods to seventy languages / / Today. 1996. October 9

A. Clement. Difficulties and ailments Russian Church / / Russian thought. 1998. June 18–24
