= Heerbrugg Castle =

- Schloss Heerbrugg
- Heerbrugg, Switzerland
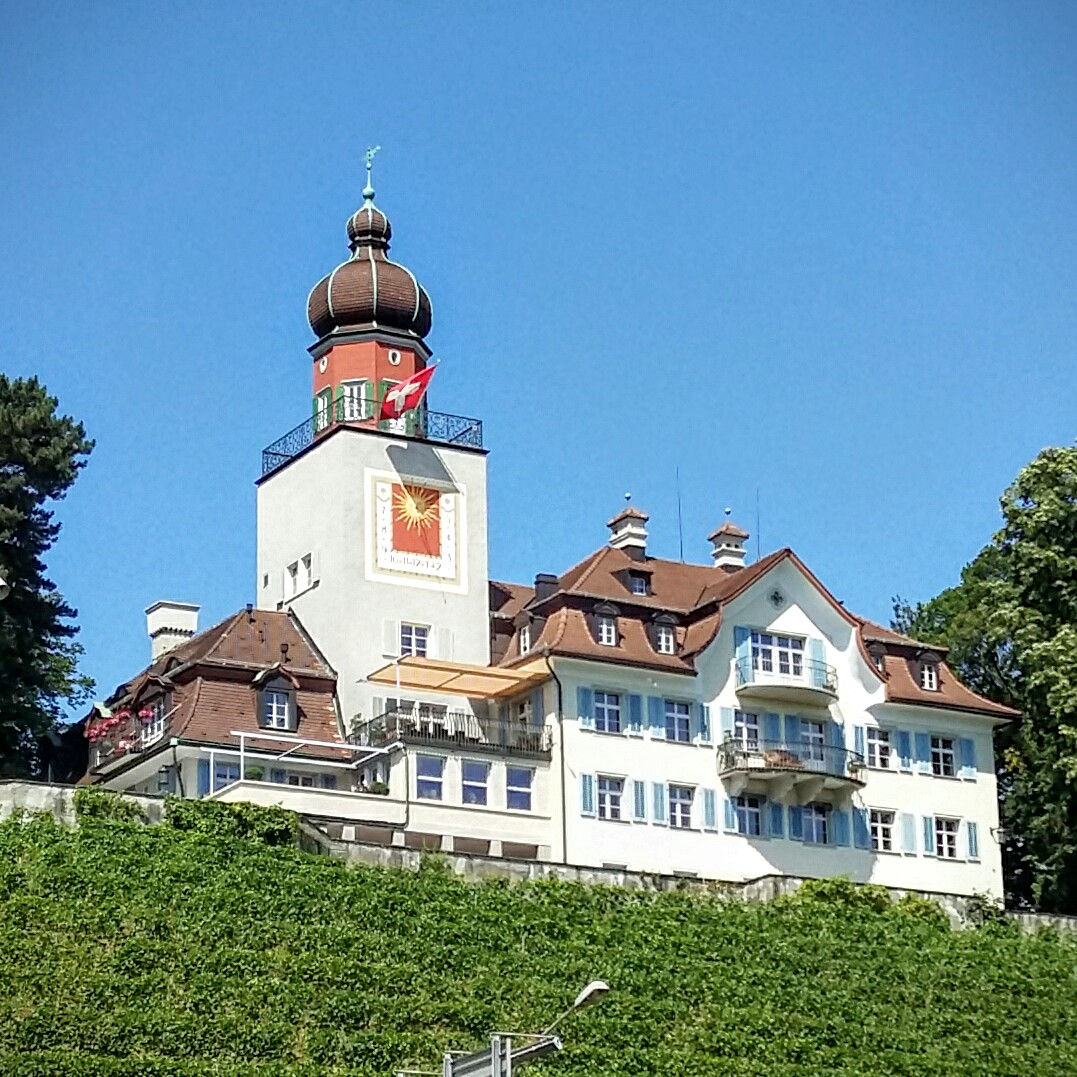

Location
- Coordinates: 47°24′36.9″N 9°37′22.7″E

Heerbrugg Castle (German: Schloss Heerbrugg) is a privately owned castle located in Heerbrugg, St. Gallen, Switzerland. It was built in 1775 by wealthy merchant Bartholomäus Schlumpf, on the Herrenbrugg über die Aich estate (where remnants of an original fort dating back to 1077 laid).

In 1774, the original estate burnt down in a fire, and Schlumpf acquired it. He not only bought the land but also the rights that came with it. He also owned a farmhouse, acreage and forestry. In 1775, he commissioned the castle to be rebuilt, as it stands today. In 1792, he sold the castle to Captain Custer of Altstätten for 16,000 Guilders. In 1833, a brother-in-law, German-born Karl Völker, originally from Eisenach, acquired it and used it as a boarding school. (Note: Sources disagree: the castle's website says that Völker acquired the castle in 1833, while the HDS article on Heerbrugg says that he owned it from 1839 to 1871.)

Between 1867 and 2005 it was owned by the Schmidheiny family before being sold to Leo von Rotz and his brother Peter von Rotz. Since 2006, it is solely owned by Peter von Rotz.
