= Rainer-Marc Frey =

Swiss businessman (born 1963)

Rainer-Marc Frey (born January 10, 1963) is a Swiss businessman, hedge fund investor and billionaire. As of 2025, Bilanz estimates his net worth at CHF $1.8 billion.

== Early life ==
Frey was born on January 10, 1963, in the Swiss canton of Basel-Landschaft. Following his Matura graduation in economics at the Gymnasium of Liestal, he studied economics at the renowned University of St. Gallen. He graduated summa cum laude with a degree in economics in 1986.

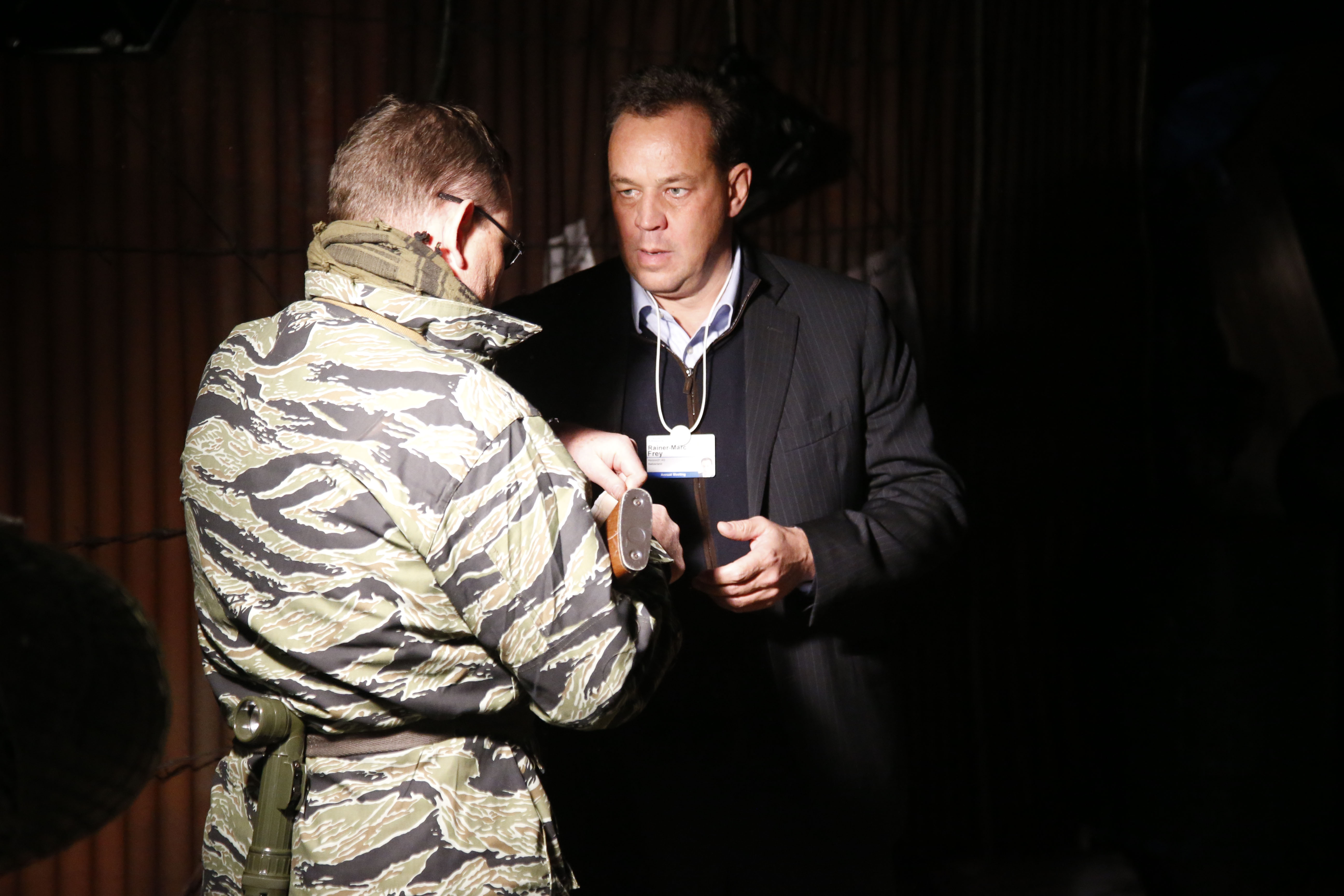
Rainer-Marc Frey at the border crossing in 'A Day in the Life of a Refugee'

== Career ==
After his studies, he worked at the American investment banks Merrill Lynch and Salomon Brothers. At Salomon Brothers, he opened new trading departments in Zürich and Frankfurt. He left the firm in 1992 and founded his own hedge fund, RMF Investment Group, along with two partners in Zug.

RMF Investment Group aimed to achieve above-average returns compared to the reference market and reduce risk through hedging strategies. RMF's investments collaborated with LGT Group, Swiss Life, and Credit Suisse. By 2002, RMF had become one of Europe's leading alternative asset managers, with assets under management reaching USD 8.5 billion. That same year, Man Group plc made a takeover offer of approximately CHF 1.35 billion for RMF, which was accepted by RMF's shareholders.

In 2004, Frey founded Horizon 21 AG, an investment firm specializing in alternative investments and headquartered in Pfäffikon, Schwyz. Following a strategic re-orientation in 2010, Horizon21 positioned itself as a private investment office, tailoring its activities around the founders’ and partners’ investment needs.

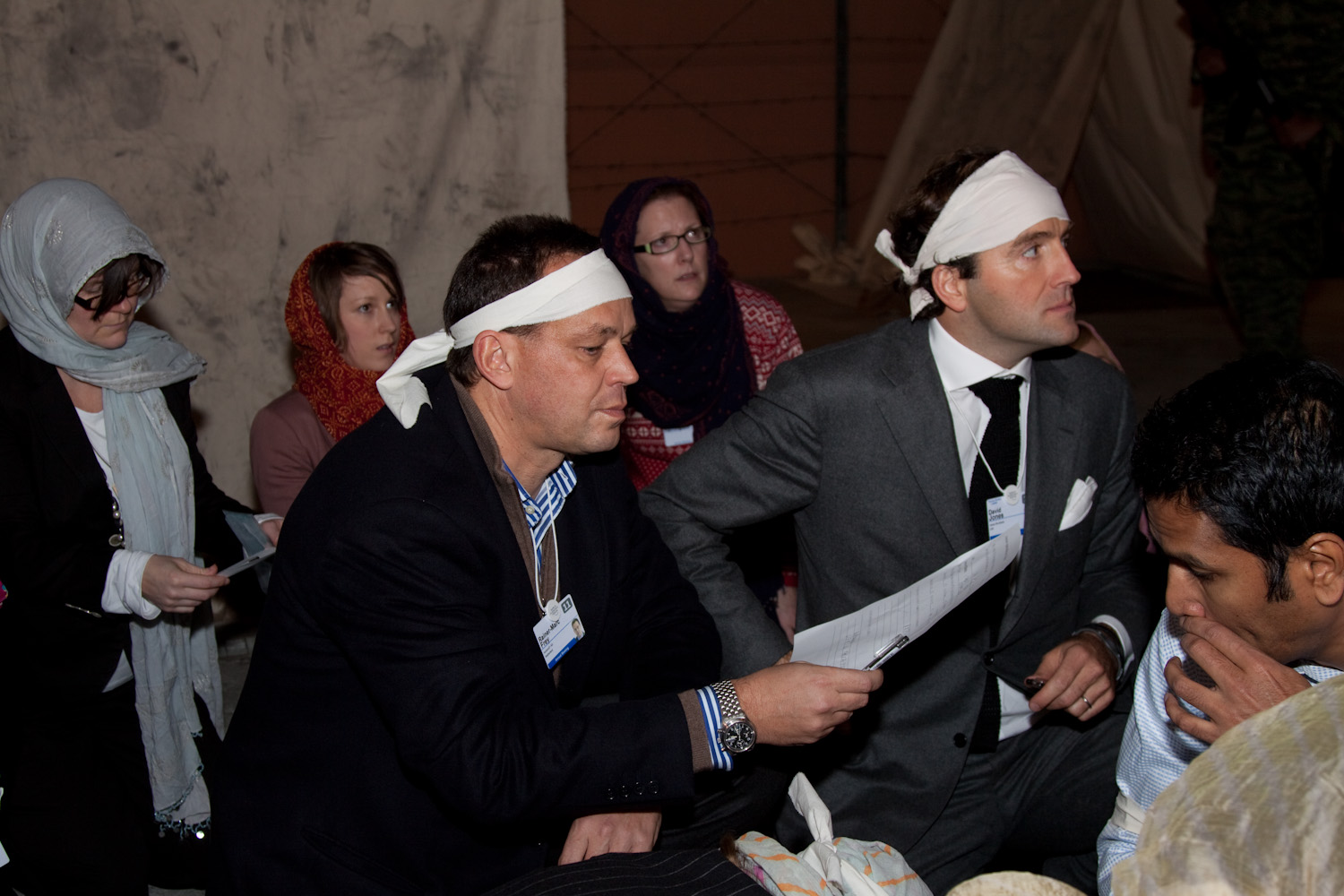
David Jones and Rainer-Marc Frey listen to orders at the Refugee Run

In October 2008, Frey was named onto the Board of Directors of UBS. The nomination of Frey was intended to bring back more knowledge of the financial industry into the board of directors. Frey was considered an independent spirit with a strong voice.

Frey is a member of the Board of Directors of DKSH since 2008 and he serves on the Audit and Strategy Committees. Frey holds a 3.9% equity stake in DKSH.

Since 2010, he also holds a stake of currently 8.67% in the Swiss pharmaceuticals company Siegfried Holding AG, based in Zofingen.

Frey is the main shareholder and has been Vice-Chairman of the Board of Directors of Lonrho Holdings Ltd since 2013. He submitted a takeover bid to the former shareholders in 2013, alongside Swiss entrepreneur Thomas Schmidheiny. The takeover was finalized on July 19, 2013, and taken private for a value of CHF 270 million.

== Personal life ==
Frey is the Vice-President of the Board of the Frey Charitable Foundation (FCF), founded in 2004. In Africa, FCF focuses on supporting outstanding social entrepreneurs in a variety of thematic areas.
