= Albert Ziegler (theologian) =

Swiss theologian (1927–2022)

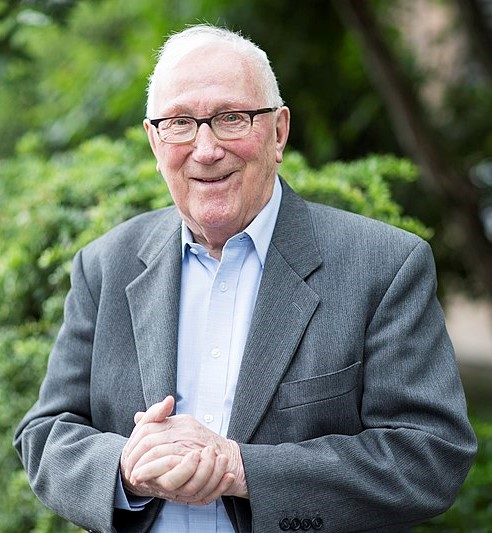
- Ziegler in 2016
- Born: 11 July 1927; Zürich, Switzerland
- Died: 4 August 2022 (aged 95); Menzingen, Zug, Switzerland
- Education: Disentis Abbey; Munich School of Philosophy; University of Fribourg (PhD); Catholic University of Leuven
- Occupations: Theologian, ethicist, author
- Years active: 1956–2022
- Relatives: Anton Rohner (great-uncle); Gebhard Rohner (great-grandfather); Georg Malin (brother-in-law)

Ecclesiastical career
- Religion: Christianity (Roman-Catholic)
- Church: Jesuits
- Ordained: 1956 (SJ in 1966)

Albert Ziegler (11 July 1927 – 4 August 2022) was a Swiss Roman-Catholic theologian, ethicist and author.

== Early life and education ==
Ziegler was bron 11 July 1927 in Zurich, Switzerland, one of three children, to Albert Gebhard Ziegler (1893–1953), a postal worker, and Bertha Amalia Ziegler (née Ochsner; 1889–1945), into a Catholic family. He had two sisters; Bertha Malin (née Ziegler; 1926–2021), a social worker, who was married to Georg Malin and Franziska Mathilde Ziegler (born 1931).

His paternal family was originally from Gaiserwald near St. Gallen, Switzerland. His great-grandfather Gebhard Rohner (1836–1908), served on the Cantonal Council of St. Gallen for the Rhine Valley constituency. His great-uncle was Anton Rohner. His maternal family hailed from Einsiedeln, Schwyz.

Ziegler attended the local schools and completed his Matura at the Disentis Abbey School. Between 1950 and 1953 he studied philosophy at the Munich School of Philosophy followed by studies in social sciences and politics at the international institute of the University of Fribourg. He received his Doctorate of Philosophy from this institution. Between 1956 and 1960, Ziegler studied Theology at the Catholic University of Leuven in Belgium.

== Career ==
During his studies he took the vows as a priest. In 1966, he took vows for the last time as commitment to the Jesuit Order, which added the honoric suffix SJ to his name. He primarily was active as university chaplain while living at Akademikerhaus (aki) in Zürich. From there he also became very active in the fields of lecturer, author and editor of newspaper articles, books and film critiques.

Later he acted as self-employed corporate consultant with topics such as work ethics. He was also a member of the Swiss Academy of Medical Sciences. He served as board director for the Swiss Social Archives from 1964 to 2007.

== Personal life ==
Ziegler lived in Zürich most of his life before relocating into the Christian nursing home St. Franziskus in Menzingen. He died there 4 August 2022 aged 95.

== Bibliography ==
=== Books ===
- Für immer nach Zürich. Ein Gespräch. Theologischer Verlag AG, Zürich 2021, 144 S., ISBN 978-3-290-20209-5.
- mit Urs C. Reinhardt: Vertrauen schaffen. Verlag Glaube + Wirtschaft, Fribourg 2003.
- mit Thierry Carrel et al.: Gesundheitswesen – wie weiter? Verlag Glaube + Wirtschaft, Fribourg 2002.
- Kenneth Angst (Hrsg.): Die Schweiz und Zürich, Zürich und die Schweiz. NZZ Buchverlag, 216 S., ISBN 978-3-85823-895-5.
- Verantwortung für das Wort. Kommunikation und Ethik. Huber-Verlag, Frauenfeld 2000.
- Verantwortungssouveränität: Unternehmensethik heute. Schmidt 1994, 2. Aufl. 207 S., ISBN 978-3-926258-13-7.
- Ethik und Unternehmungsführung aus der Sicht der katholischen Soziallehre. In: Charles Lattmann: Ethik in der Unternehmensführung. Springer-Verlag, Heidelberg 1988, ISBN 978-3-7908-0385-3.
- Zwingli – eine katholische Aufgabe, ein ökumenisches Anliegen. Verlag Neue Zürcher Nachrichten, Zürich 1984, 96 S., ISBN 978-3-85827-067-2.
- mit Eduard Christen et al.: Hinweise zur moraltheologischen Frage der Gewaltanwendung. Benziger, Zürich 1972, 370 S.
- Jesuiten im heutigen Staat: Versuch einer Standortbestimmung. EVZ-Verlag, 1968, 84 S.
- Das natürliche Entscheidungsrecht des Mannes in Ehe und Familie. F. H. Kerle, 1958, 508 S.

=== Magazines ===
- Der missverständliche Hirtenbrief. In: Neue Zürcher Zeitung. 5 April 2012, S. 23, retrieved 27 August 2022.
- Verbietet oder erlaubt der Papst Kondome? In: Neue Zürcher Zeitung. 9 December 2010, S. 53, retrieved 27 August 2022.
- Eine Gefahr für die eigene Glaubwürdigkeit. Betrachtungen zum Boom sogenannter ethischer Anlageprodukte. In: Neue Zürcher Zeitung. 17 December 2007, S. 20, retrieved 27 August 2022.
- Kein klares Motiv für die Bluttat in der ZKB. Führungsseminar ZKB. In: Neue Zürcher Zeitung. 29 October 2004, S. 53, retrieved 27 August 2022.
- Betreuung von Patienten am Lebensende. In: Neue Zürcher Zeitung. 26 February 2004, S. 9, retrieved 27 August 2022 (Ethik).
- Pascal Hollenstein: Was darf das Leben kosten? In: NZZ am Sonntag. 31 March 2002, S. 28, retrieved 27 August 2022 (Ethik).
- Musik für einen Gast. DRS2, 12.40. In: Neue Zürcher Zeitung. 22 October 2000, S. 72, retrieved 27 August 2022.
- Die deutschen Bischöfe müssen ihre Hausaufgaben selbst lösen. In: Neue Zürcher Zeitung. 27 February 1998, S. 7, retrieved 27 August 2022.
- Den Gesang in den Dingen hören. In: Neue Zürcher Zeitung. 10 December 1995, S. 95, retrieved 27 August 2022.
