= Anton Rohner =

Swiss clergyman and professor (1871–1951)

Anton Rohner OP
- Rohner c. 1950
- Born: Joseph August Rohner; 24 February 1871; Au, St. Gallen, Switzerland
- Died: 4 November 1951 (aged 80); Fribourg, Switzerland
- Other name: Anton Rohner (clergy name)
- Education: University of Fribourg; University of Düsseldorf
- Occupations: Clergy; professor; pastor; philosopher
- Parent: Gebhard Rohner (father)
- Relatives: Albert Ziegler (great-nephew)

Joseph August Rohner commonly known as Anton Rohner (24 February 1871 - 4 November 1951) was a Swiss clergyman, professor, pastor, philosopher and member of the Dominican Order. Since 1940, he served as principal of the University of Fribourg. He was a great-uncle of Albert Ziegler.

== Early life and education ==
Rohner was born 24 February 1871 in Au, St. Gallen, Switzerland, the seventh of twelve children, to Joseph Gebhard Rohner (1836-1908) and Anna Maria (née Zoller; 1835–1912). His father was a well-respected personality who served as municipal councilor and as a member of the Cantonal Council of St. Gallen. He was active in the textile industry. Rohner's elder brother, Gebhard Jr., served as custodian of the Abbey of Saint Gall. His youngest brother, Joseph Carl Rohner known as Anselm, was clergy as well in Lucerne.

He completed the Gymnasium in Engelberg and at the Lyceum Schwyz. Then he studied philosophy and theology at the University of Fribourg and the University of Düsseldorf.

== Career ==
After receiving his Doctorate in Philosophy, Rohner spent nine years living in Rome and Turin, Italy. Between 1919 and 1921, he served as professor at the University of Fribourg, and again from 1922 to 1942. Between 1940 and 1941 he was the principal and from 1941 to 1942 the vice-principal of the university.

== Literature ==
- Die Gewissensfreiheit. Rektoratsrede zur feierlichen Eröffnung des Studienjahres am 15. Nov. 1940. Fribourg 1940 (in German)
