= Fundación Avina =

Fundación Avina is a Latin American philanthropic foundation working towards sustainable development in Latin America by encouraging alliances between social and business leaders.

The foundation is part of the Steering Group of the Foundations Platform F20, an international network of foundations and philanthropic organizations.

== Overview ==
Avina was founded in 1994 by Stephan Schmidheiny. Since 2024, its Chairman has been Gabriel Baracatt and its CEO has been Valeria Scorza. It is based in Panama, and has offices in Buenos Aires, Argentina; Santa Cruz de la Sierra, Bolivia; Rio de Janeiro, Brazil; Santiago, Chile; Bogota, Colombia; Cuenca, Ecuador; Asuncion, Paraguay; and Lima, Peru. Fundación Avina works in Latin America as a broker, co-investor and facilitator, leveraging its resources, local presence and relationships with thousands of allies to incubate and scale up shared strategies for change. It has worked with the Jesuits on a joint "Centro Magis" programme of education. Its primary contribution to its allies is the promotion of collaborative action through services and financial support.

Recent Avina activities include a series of projects with Xylem in Brazil's Semiarid, the country's northeast region, which is particularly vulnerable to water scarcity. Avina also shows important achievements in impacting businesses, which means making money while generating social and environmental benefits. With CAF (Development Bank of Latin America) Avina has subscribed to an Agreement of Understanding, through which they propose the establishment of alliances to foster development in Latin America.

In Chile there is a joint venture between the Florida-based Advanced Magnet Lab, the Advanced Innovation Center of Chile, and Fundación Avina. This joint venture will utilize the country as a platform for the demonstration of innovative applications in energy efficiency and production.

The Business Inquirer magazine, in an article titled "New business model to create bigger market?", defined Avina as "one of the leading promoters of Inclusive Markets". Avina also appears in a Forbes magazine article about Brazil's first impact investing venture capital firm.

Civil society organizations and research institutions that form part of the Amazonian Network of Georeferenced Socio-Environmental Information (RAISG) in December 2012 published a 68-page book of maps and data called Amazonia Under Pressure The work behind the publication includes institutions such as the Norwegian Rainforest Foundation, the Ford Foundation, the Fundación Avina and the Skoll Foundation.

== Social Progress Index ==
The Social Progress Index, which ranked 50 countries by their social and environmental performance, was designed by Professor Michael E. Porter and The Social Progress Imperative, working in collaboration with economists at the Massachusetts Institute of Technology (MIT) and leading international organisations in social entrepreneurship, business, philanthropy, and academia including Cisco, Deloitte Touche Tohmatsu Limited (DTTL), Skoll Foundation, Fundación Avina, and Compartamos Banco.

== Latin America Donor Index ==
The Latin America Donor Index is the result of a collaboration between Fundación Avina and the Office of Outreach and Partnerships of the Inter-American Development Bank, so non-profits and donors alike can identify potential allies.

Available in English, Spanish, and Portuguese, the Latin America Donor Index features an index of donor organizations, and a resource library, including the latest trends in Latin America and the Caribbean.
