= Stephan Schmidheiny =

Swiss billionaire businessman

- Schmidheiny in 1992
- Born: Stephan Ernst Schmidheiny; 29 October 1947 (age 79); Balgach, Switzerland
- Education: University of Zurich (PhD)
- Occupations: Businessman, industrialist, philanthropist
- Known for: Leading Eternit; Asbestos scandal
- Spouses: Ruth Kipper (m. 1974; div. 2002) Viktoria Werner (m. 2012)
- Children: 2
- Website: Personal website

Stephan Ernst Schmidheiny (born 29 October 1947) is a Swiss billionaire, businessman, industrialist and philanthropist. He is primarily known for his work at Eternit as well as his legal cases involving convictions of manslaughter. As of 2026, none of the convictions are currently enforceable.

== Early life and education ==
Schmidheiny was born 29 October 1947 in Balgach, Switzerland to Max Schmidheiny and Adda Scherrer. His great-grandfather, Jacob Schmidheiny, who hailed from Balgach, made a fortune through building materials and industrial manufacturing later being known as Eternit and Holcim.

Schmidheiny completed his Law studies with a PhD at the University of Zurich in 1972.

== Career ==
In 1972, Schmidheiny started his business career at Eternit. In 1976, at the age of 29, he was named CEO of the Swiss Eternit Group. According to his brother Thomas Schmidheiny, their father Max Schmidheiny decided to divide his industrial empire into two halves: asbestos for Stephan, cement for Thomas. As a result of this split of activities, Schmidheiny inherited Eternit.

While Schmidheiny withdrew from asbestos production and Eternit, he invested in new industrial segments, building up a multinational conglomerate of shareholdings by adding enterprises in the areas of forestry, banking, consumer goods, power generation, as well as electronic and optical equipment.

In 1985, Schmidheiny supported Nicolas Hayek in his bid for the Swiss watch holding company Société de Microélectronique et d'Horlogerie(SMH), which resulted in the rescue of the Swiss watch industry. Later from this alliance, the present day Swatch Group was formed.

== Philanthropy ==
Schmidheiny is an advocate and leader in the field of sustainable development. He served as adviser on sustainability to the United Nations as well as to the OECD.

In the 1980s he created FUNDES, an organization that supports the development of small and medium-sized enterprises in several Latin American countries. According to recent Swiss accounts, Schmidheiny began buying Chilean forest land in 1982, and he now owns over 120,000 hectares in Southern Chile, near Concepción, land which the Mapuche Indians claim has been theirs since time immemorial. The Mapuche charge that some of the land Schmidheiny bought was stolen from them during the Pinochet dictatorship, using that regime's standard techniques of intimidation, torture, and murder.

In March 2019, two months before his conviction on two counts of involuntary manslaughter, Forbes included Schmidheiny in its list of the world's most generous philanthropists outside of the US.

=== Rio Summit 1992 ===
Following his involvement in the Rio Summit, Schmidheiny authored the book Change of Course: Global Business Prospects for Development and the Environment, published by MIT Press in 1992. His book offers an extensive analysis of how businesses can make sustainable development their focus, his book has been translated into fifteen languages. He also contributed to Financing Change: The Financial Community, Eco-efficiency, and Sustainable Development also published by MIT Press.

=== Fundación Avina ===
In the 1990s Schmidheiny established the Fundación Avina , which contributes to sustainable development in Latin America by encouraging productive alliances among social and business leaders and today is a leading player in that field. The foundation pioneered a South American microfinance system similar to that of Muhammad Yunus whose widely praised system benefits the citizens of Bangladesh.

=== Other philanthropy ===
Schmidheiny supports arts and culture through a series of initiatives. He has developed and expanded the art collection of his deceased brother Alexander, the Daros Collection. The Daros Collection, based in Zurich is a substantial collection of North American and European art from the second half of the 20th century.

== Personal life ==
In 1977, Schmidheiny married firstly to Ruth Kipper (1949–2019), they had two children.

Schmidheiny married secondly to fellow divorcee Austrian-born Viktoria Werner (born 1956), a physician originally from Vienna, in 2012. She has two children on her own.

In 2025, his net worth was estimated by Bilanz to be CHF3.8 billion.

=== Legal disputes ===
Schmidheiny has been involved in trials in Italy since 2012, connected to the use of asbestos in the factories of Eternit.

He admitted in an interview in 2015 that the strain from the legal proceedings in Italy had deeply affected him. Beyond the aforementioned legal proceedings, Schmidheiny set up funds for victims of asbestos-related diseases in South Africa and Italy, as these countries had no successor company to Eternit, which could bear the financial consequences of asbestos exposure.

In May 2019, Schmidheiny was sentenced to four years in prison by a Turin court for involuntary manslaughter in the death of two workers. The ruling followed a decade-long battle between Schmidheiny, the Italian government, former Eternit workers, and residents of towns near the company's asbestos plants. Prosecutor Gianfranco Colace said the ruling set a precedent on deaths from cancer and pulmonary diseases, which can take years to develop after contact with asbestos fiber In 2023, he was sentenced to 12 years in prison on aggravated manslaughter charges related to the deaths of 392 people in Casale Monferrato.

In October 2025, the Turin Court of Appeals reduced his sentence from Novara Court’s twelve year ruling to nine years and six months for aggravated manslaughter.

=== Awards ===
In 1993, Schmidheiny received an honorary doctorate from the Instituto Centroamerica de Administración de Empresas (INCAE), Costa Rica and the same honorary doctorate in 1996 by Yale University.

In 2001, Schmidheiny received the Zayed International Prize for the Environment for "Environmental Action Leading to Positive Change in Society".
