= Max Schmidheiny =

Swiss politician and entrepreneur (1908–1991)

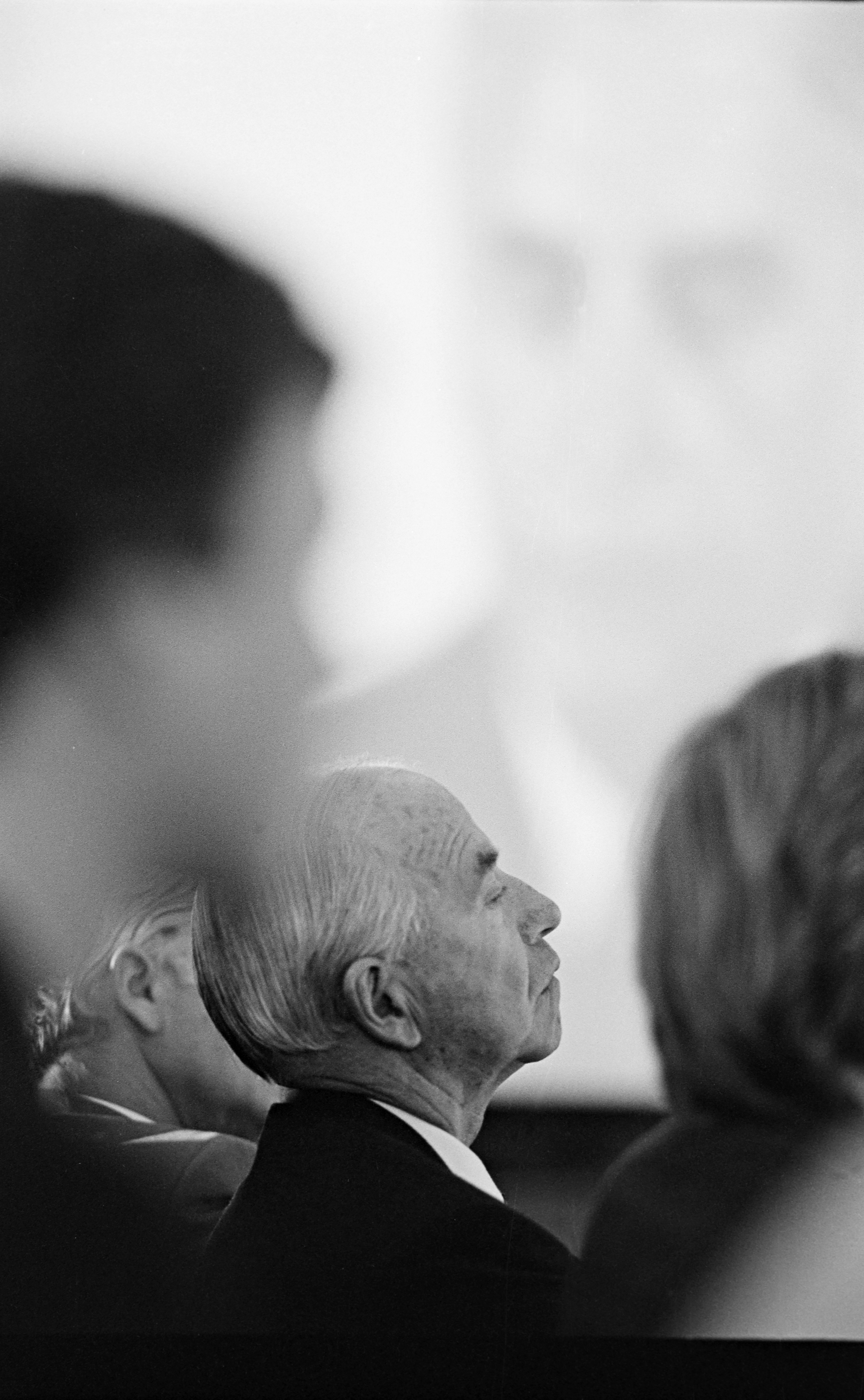
- Image of Max Schmidheiny

Member of the National Council (Switzerland)
- In office 7 December 1959 – 1 December 1963
- Constituency: Canton of St. Gallen

Member of the Cantonal Council of St. Gallen
- In office 1948–1958

Personal details
- Born: Max Schmidheiny; 3 April 1908 Castle Heerbrugg, Balgach, Switzerland
- Died: 19 August 1991 (aged 83) Altstätten, Switzerland
- Spouse: Adda Scherrer (m. 1944)
- Children: 4, including Thomas and Stephan

Max Schmidheiny (3 April 1908 – 19 August 1991) was a Swiss industrialist, politician and philanthropist who founded the Max Schmidheiny Foundation. He also served on the Swiss National Council from 1959 to 1963 and previously on the Cantonal Council of St. Gallen between 1948 and 1958 for the Free Democratic Party.

In 1984, he divided the family construction materials empire between his sons, with Thomas Schmidheiny inheriting Holcim (the concrete and cement company) and Stephan Schmidheiny the construction company Eternit.
