= Lonrho =

London-based conglomerate

- Type: Private
- Industry: Conglomerate
- Founded: 1998 (as Lonrho Africa plc)
- Headquarters: London, W1; United Kingdom
- Revenue: ▲£ 206.5 Million (2013)
- Total assets: ▼£ 328.5 Million (2013)
- Number of employees: 3,415 (2013)
- Website: www.lonrho.com

Lonrho is a London-based conglomerate that was established in 1998 as Lonrho Africa plc. It is engaged in multiple business sectors in Africa, mainly agribusiness, infrastructure, transport, hospitality and support services.

== History ==
Lonrho traces its roots to the original Lonrho plc (now Lonmin), a company which was incorporated in the United Kingdom on 13 May 1909 as the London and Rhodesian Mining and Land Company Limited. Lonrho plc grew to be one of the world's largest companies, with over 800 subsidiary companies in 80 countries.

One previous CEO of Lonrho plc was the controversial Tiny Rowland (1917–1998), a corporate raider who ran the firm from 1962 to 1993. Scholars have noted that while he may have been the "unacceptable face of capitalism", in the words of Edward Heath, Lonrho plc worked in tandem with the British government in protecting British business interests in Africa after independence.

The current company named Lonrho was formed on 26 February 1998 as a spin-off of Lonmin (at the time called "Lonrho plc"), and it was first known as Lonrho Africa plc. The demerger transferred all non-mining African assets to the separate publicly listed Lonrho Africa plc, while Lonrho plc (now Lonmin) retained the mining businesses. Lonrho Africa plc subsequently changed its name to Lonrho plc on 10 May 2007, following the approval of shareholders.

Lonrho was one of the funding partners in low-cost airline Fastjet, operating in Africa. This was after they exchanged their stake in Fly 540 for shares in Rubicon Diversified Investments plc, which was renamed Fastjet in August 2012.

Lonrho Pre-rebrand logo

In 2013, Lonrho plc was delisted from the LSE, JSE and OTCQX after agreeing to a £174.5 million takeover by FS Africa, a bid vehicle controlled by Swiss billionaire Thomas Schmidheiny and Rainer-Marc Frey.
