= Thomas Schmidheiny =

Swiss businessman

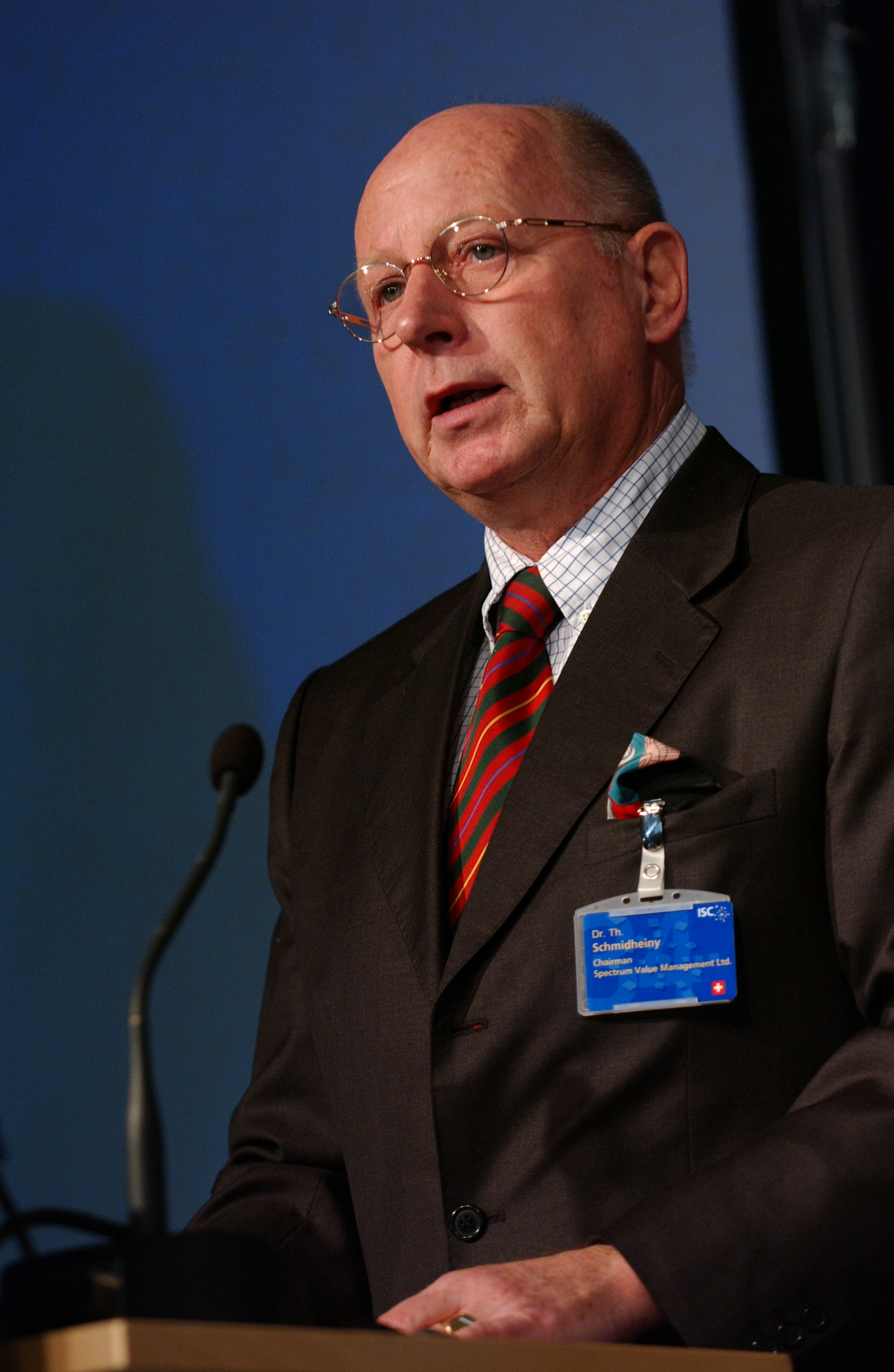
- ISC-Symposium 2004
- Born: 17 December 1945 (age 80); Balgach, Switzerland
- Education: Tufts University; Zurich Polytechnic
- Occupation: Major shareholder of LafargeHolcim
- Spouse: married
- Children: 4
- Parent: Max Schmidheiny
- Relatives: Stephan Schmidheiny (brother)

Thomas Schmidheiny (born 17 December 1945) is a Swiss billionaire businessman. He is the former chairman of cement manufacturer, Holcim.

== Early life ==
Schmidheiny was born in 1945, the son of Max Schmidheiny (1908-1991). The family's construction materials empire (bricks, cement, etc.) was divided in 1984, with Thomas inheriting Holcim, the concrete and cement company, and his brother Stephan, also a billionaire, was given the construction company Eternit.

Schmidheiny holds a doctorate from Tufts University and a Diplomingenieur degree from the ETH Zurich, and an MBA from IMD Business School, Switzerland.

== Career ==
Until 2003, Schmidheiny was the chairman of Holcim, one of the world's leading cement manufacturers, founded by his grand-uncle in 1912. Schmidheiny resigned his chairmanship as part of a deal to settle an investigation of insider trading in Spain. He has remained on the Board since that time. Since the merger between Holcim and Lafarge, Schmidheiny is the biggest shareholder of Lafarge-Holcim.

In 2013, Schmidheiny and Rainer-Marc Frey acquired Lonrho through their investment vehicle, FS Africa, in a £174.5 million takeover.

Schmidheiny is a member of the Executive Advisory Board of the World.Minds Foundation.

== Personal life ==
Schmidheiny is married with four children; he owns vineyards and wineries in Argentina, Switzerland and the US (Cuvaison in the Napa Valley), including his residences in Rapperswil-Jona and Klosters.

The Indian School of Business has a Thomas Schmidheiny chair of family business.
