= DKSH =

Swiss market expansion services company

- Type: Public
- Traded as: DKSH
- Industry: Market expansion services
- Founded: 1865; 161 years ago
- Headquarters: Zurich, Switzerland
- Area served: Asia Pacific, Europe, and North America
- Key people: Marco Gadola (Chairman); Stefan P. Butz (CEO)
- Services: Sourcing, market insights, marketing and sales, regulatory support, distribution and logistics, and after-sales services
- Revenue: CHF 11.1 billion (2025)
- Number of employees: 26,840 (2025)
- Website: www.dksh.com

DKSH is a Swiss market expansion services company headquartered in Zurich. The company provides sourcing, market insights, marketing and sales, regulatory support, distribution and logistics, and after-sales services. DKSH is listed on the SIX Swiss Exchange and is active mainly in the Asia-Pacific region. The group is organized into four business units: Consumer Goods, Healthcare, Performance Materials, and Technology.

== History ==
DKSH traces its roots to Swiss trading businesses established in Asia in the 19th century. The earliest precursor, Siber & Brennwald, was founded in Yokohama in 1865. Eduard Keller later set up his own firm in the Philippines in 1887, and Wilhelm Heinrich Diethelm established Diethelm & Co. in Singapore in the same year.

In 2000, Diethelm Holding and Edward Keller Holding merged to form Diethelm Keller Holding. Two years later, that group merged with SiberHegner to form DKSH.

DKSH was listed on the SIX Swiss Exchange on 20 March 2012. The IPO comprised 17.1 million secondary shares priced at CHF 48, including the executed greenshoe, SIX reported a transaction size of CHF 903.3 million and a first-day market capitalization of CHF 3.2 billion. The stock closed at CHF 51 on its first trading day. Around the time of the listing, DKSH reported revenue of CHF 7.3 billion for 2011 and employed 24,000 people across 35 countries. By 2012, the company had 180 distribution centers and a fleet of 2,375 trucks.

In 2018, DKSH Holdings (Malaysia) agreed to buy Auric Pacific (M), a Malaysian distributor of chilled and frozen products, for S$157.67 million, or RM480.9 million. In 2020, the company acquired Axieo, a specialty chemicals distributor in Australia and New Zealand.

In 2022, the company acquired Terra Firma, a North American specialty chemicals distributor, expanding DKSH's Performance Materials business to the United States and Canada.

In 2025, DKSH marked 160 years since the founding of Siber & Brennwald in Japan.

== Operations ==
DKSH is active primarily in Southeast Asia, which accounts for about 70 percent of its sales. The company operates through four business units: Consumer Goods, Healthcare, Performance Materials, and Technology. Healthcare is its largest business unit.

As of 2025, the company reported operations in 35 markets, net sales of CHF 11.1 billion, and 26,840 employees. As of November 2025, DKSH's market value was estimated at CHF 3.5 billion (US$4.4 billion).

The company is headed by chief executive officer Stefan P. Butz, who succeeded Joerg Wolle in 2017. Wolle had served as CEO since the company's formation in 2002 and later became chairman of the board. As of 2026, the chairman is Marco Gadola.
