= Diepoldsau =

- Municipality
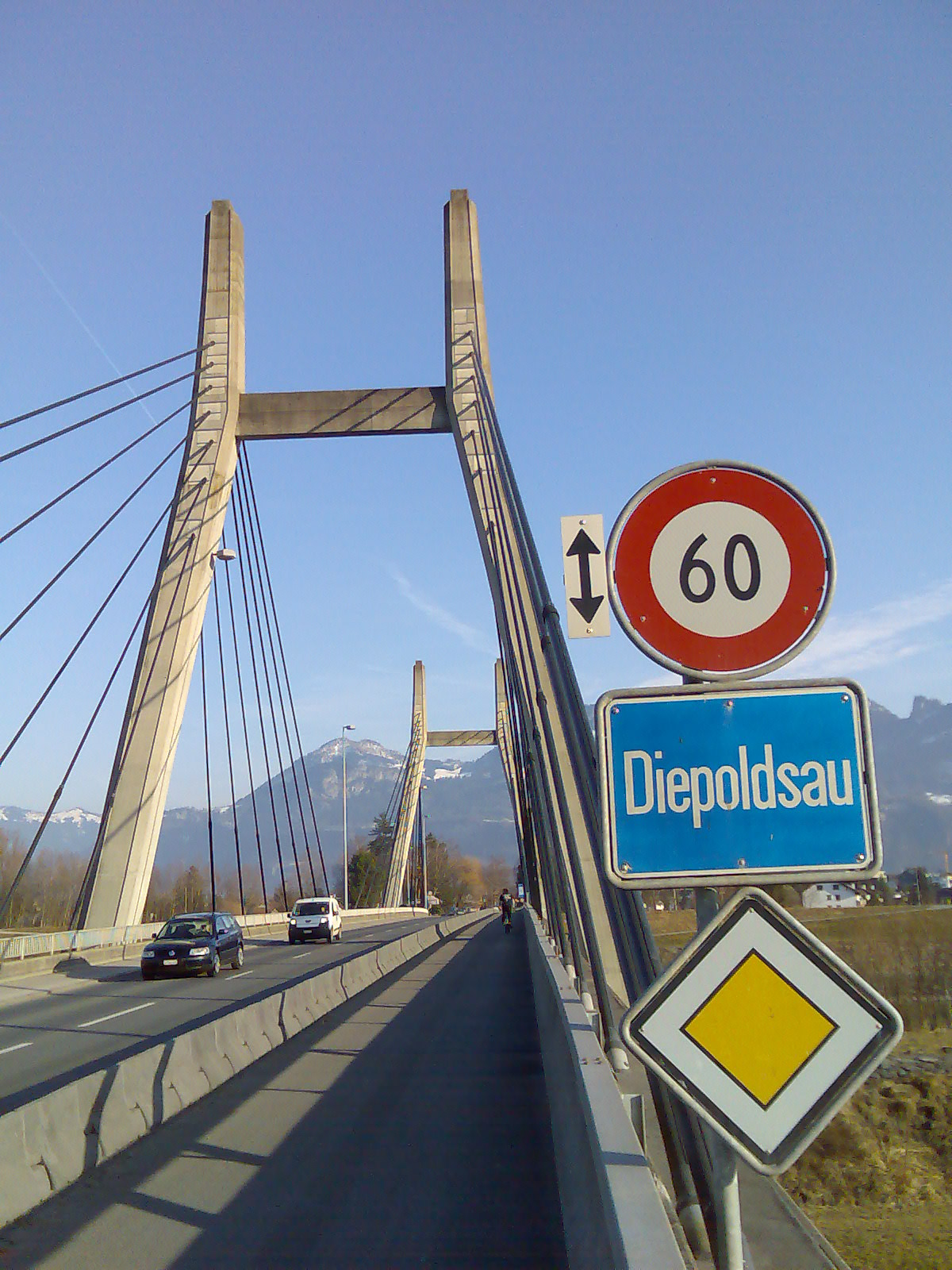

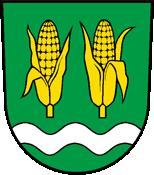
- Coat of arms
- Location of Diepoldsau
- Location within Switzerland Location within Canton of St. Gallen
- Coordinates: 47°23′N 9°39′E
- Country: Switzerland
- Canton: St. Gallen
- District: Rheintal

Government
  - Mayor: Ralph Lehner (The Centre)

Area
  - Total: 11.23 km^{2} (4.34 sq mi)
- Elevation: 408 m (1,339 ft)

Population (December 2020)
  - Total: 6,479
  - Density: 576.9/km^{2} (1,494/sq mi)
- Time zone: UTC+01:00 (CET)
  - Summer (DST): UTC+02:00 (CEST)
- Postal code: 9444
- SFOS number: 3234
- ISO 3166 code: CH-SG
- Surrounded by: Altach (AT-8), Balgach, Hohenems (AT-8), Lustenau (AT-8), Oberriet, Widnau
- Website: diepoldsau.ch

Diepoldsau is a municipality in the Wahlkreis (constituency) of Rheintal in the canton of St. Gallen in Switzerland.

== History ==
Diepoldsau is first mentioned in 891 as Thiotpoldesouua. Schmitter is first mentioned in 1385.

It was the crossing point for Jews escaping Nazi Germany into the St. Gallen area.

Thousands of Jews were saved despite the general Swiss Policy of severely restricting Jewish escape from Nazi Germany from 1933 to 1945.

In 1938, a labour camp for refugees was set up in an old embroidery factory. It was supervised by the Swiss Red Cross and financed by the Jewish Community of St. Gallen. This was in keeping with Switzerland's policy that religious communities were financially responsible for refugees of their denomination, which put tremendous pressure on the comparatively small Jewish communities. The Swiss federal government did not contribute.

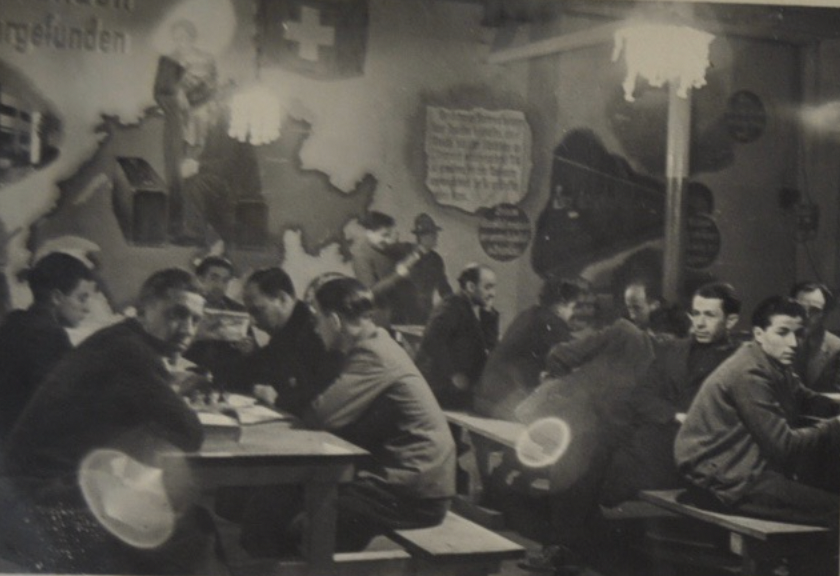
The common room in the Diepoldsau refugee labour camp in 1938, from the photo album of Leo(n) Sternbach, in the collection of the Jewish Museum of Switzerland.

The refugees were not permitted to seek work and were subject to frequent police controls and restrictive measures.

== Geography ==
Aerial view (1949)

Diepoldsau has an area, as of 2006, of 11.2 km^{2} (4.3 sq mi). Of this area, 67.1% is used for agricultural purposes, while 4.1% is forested. Of the rest of the land, 20.3% is settled (buildings or roads) and the remainder (8.5%) is non-productive (rivers or lakes).

The municipality was located in the Unterrheintal district, until the district became part of the Rheintal Wahlkreis. The municipality is on the border with Austria. It consists of the villages of Diepoldsau and Schmitter on the shore of the old Rhein at the Hohenemser curve.

== Coat of arms ==
The blazon of the municipal coat of arms is Vert two Ears of Maize Or and in base a Barrulet wavy Argent.

== Demographics ==
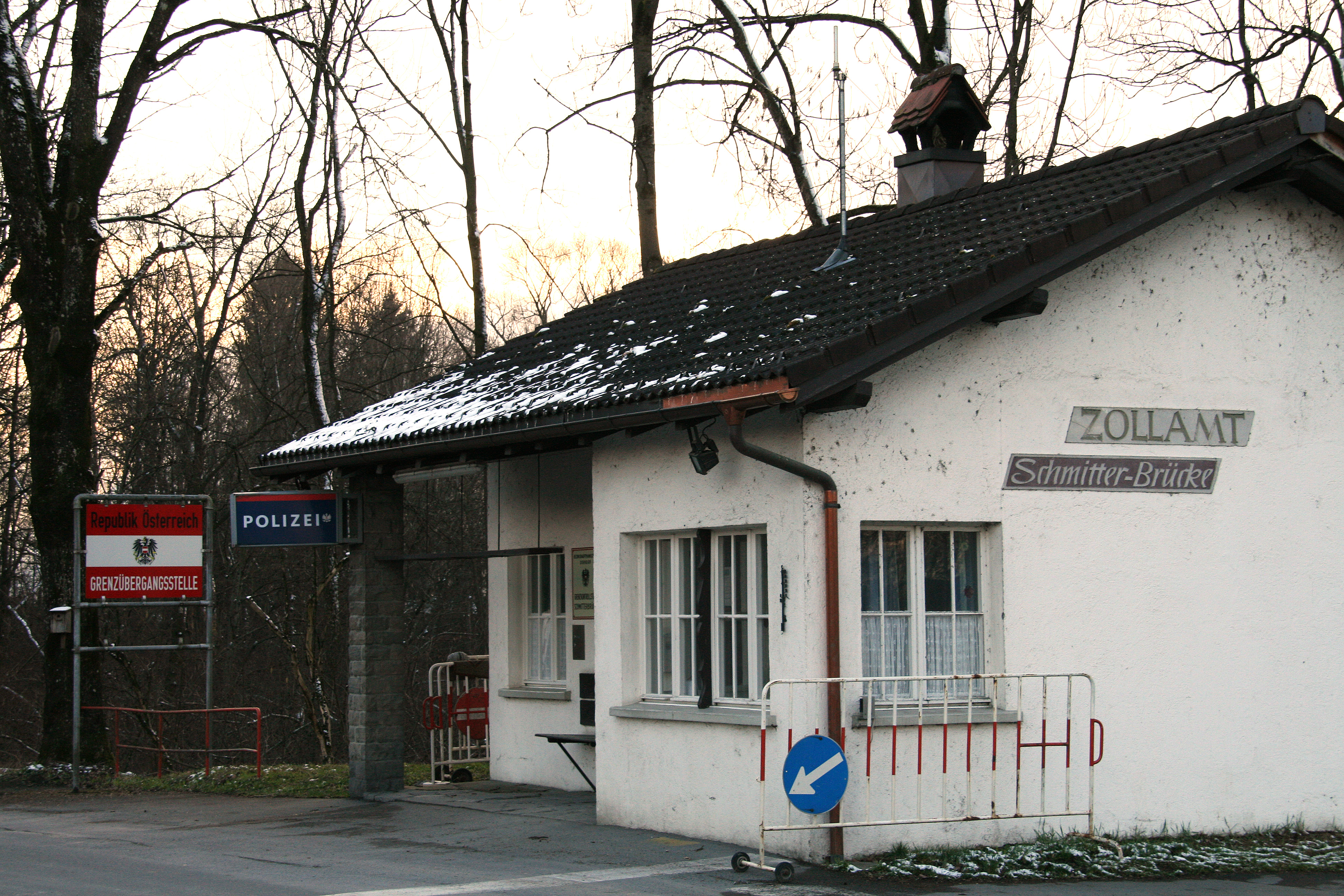
Customs station on Austrian border in the village of Schmitter

Diepoldsau has a population (as of 31 December 2020) of 6,479. As of 2007, about 20.1% of the population was made up of foreign nationals. Of the foreign population, (as of 2000), 48 are from Germany, 172 are from Italy, 432 are from ex-Yugoslavia, 147 are from Austria, 40 are from Turkey, and 82 are from another country. Over the last 10 years the population has grown at a rate of 21.7%. Most of the population (as of 2000) speaks German (91.1%), with Albanian being second most common (3.1%) and Italian being third (2.1%). Of the Swiss national languages (as of 2000), 4,586 speak German, 12 people speak French, 106 people speak Italian, and 2 people speak Romansh.

The age distribution, as of 2000, in Diepoldsau is; 719 children or 14.3% of the population are between 0 and 9 years old and 718 teenagers or 14.3% are between 10 and 19. Of the adult population, 674 people or 13.4% of the population are between 20 and 29 years old. 873 people or 17.3% are between 30 and 39, 711 people or 14.1% are between 40 and 49, and 570 people or 11.3% are between 50 and 59. The senior population distribution is 344 people or 6.8% of the population are between 60 and 69 years old, 270 people or 5.4% are between 70 and 79, there are 138 people or 2.7% who are between 80 and 89, and there are 17 people or 0.3% who are between 90 and 99.

In 2000 there were 435 persons (or 8.6% of the population) who were living alone in a private dwelling. There were 966 (or 19.2%) persons who were part of a couple (married or otherwise committed) without children, and 3,225 (or 64.1%) who were part of a couple with children. There were 252 (or 5.0%) people who lived in single parent home, while there are 29 persons who were adult children living with one or both parents, 35 persons who lived in a household made up of relatives, 28 who lived household made up of unrelated persons, and 64 who are either institutionalized or live in another type of collective housing.

In the 2007 federal election the most popular party was the SVP which received 41.7% of the vote. The next three most popular parties were the CVP (28.8%), the FDP (12%) and the SP (7.8%).

The entire Swiss population is generally well educated. In Diepoldsau about 69.1% of the population (between age 25–64) have completed either non-mandatory upper secondary education or additional higher education (either university or a Fachhochschule). Out of the total population in Diepoldsau, as of 2000, the highest education level completed by 1,113 people (22.1% of the population) was Primary, while 1,859 (36.9%) have completed Secondary, 440 (8.7%) have attended a Tertiary school, and 230 (4.6%) are not in school. The remainder did not answer this question.

The historical population is given in the following table:

year	population
1798	Diepoldsau 673 Schmitter 472
1850	2,586
1880	3,167^{a}
1888	2,014^{b}
1900	2,129
1910	2,804
1950	2,954
2000	5,034
2010	5,962
2020	6,540
2023	6,986

^a Including Widnau
^b Not including Widnau

== Economy ==
As of 2007, Diepoldsau had an unemployment rate of 1.82%. As of 2005, there were 160 people employed in the primary economic sector and about 35 businesses involved in this sector. 1,760 people are employed in the secondary sector and there are 101 businesses in this sector. 859 people are employed in the tertiary sector, with 180 businesses in this sector.

As of October 2009 the average unemployment rate was 4.2%. There were 330 businesses in the municipality of which 100 were involved in the secondary sector of the economy while 197 were involved in the third.

As of 2000 there were 1,191 residents who worked in the municipality, while 1,463 residents worked outside Diepoldsau and 1,070 people commuted into the municipality for work.

== Religion ==
From the 2000 census, 2,877 or 57.2% are Roman Catholic, while 1,311 or 26.0% belonged to the Swiss Reformed Church. Of the rest of the population, there are 77 individuals (or about 1.53% of the population) who belong to the Orthodox Church, and there are 82 individuals (or about 1.63% of the population) who belong to another Christian church. There are 3 individuals (or about 0.06% of the population) who are Jewish, and 373 (or about 7.41% of the population) who are Islamic. There are 10 individuals (or about 0.20% of the population) who belong to another church (not listed on the census), 180 (or about 3.58% of the population) belong to no church, are agnostic or atheist, and 121 individuals (or about 2.40% of the population) did not answer the question.

== Trivia ==
Diepoldsau was one of the locations in the Swiss-Austrian film Akte Grüninger.
