= Widnau =

- Municipality
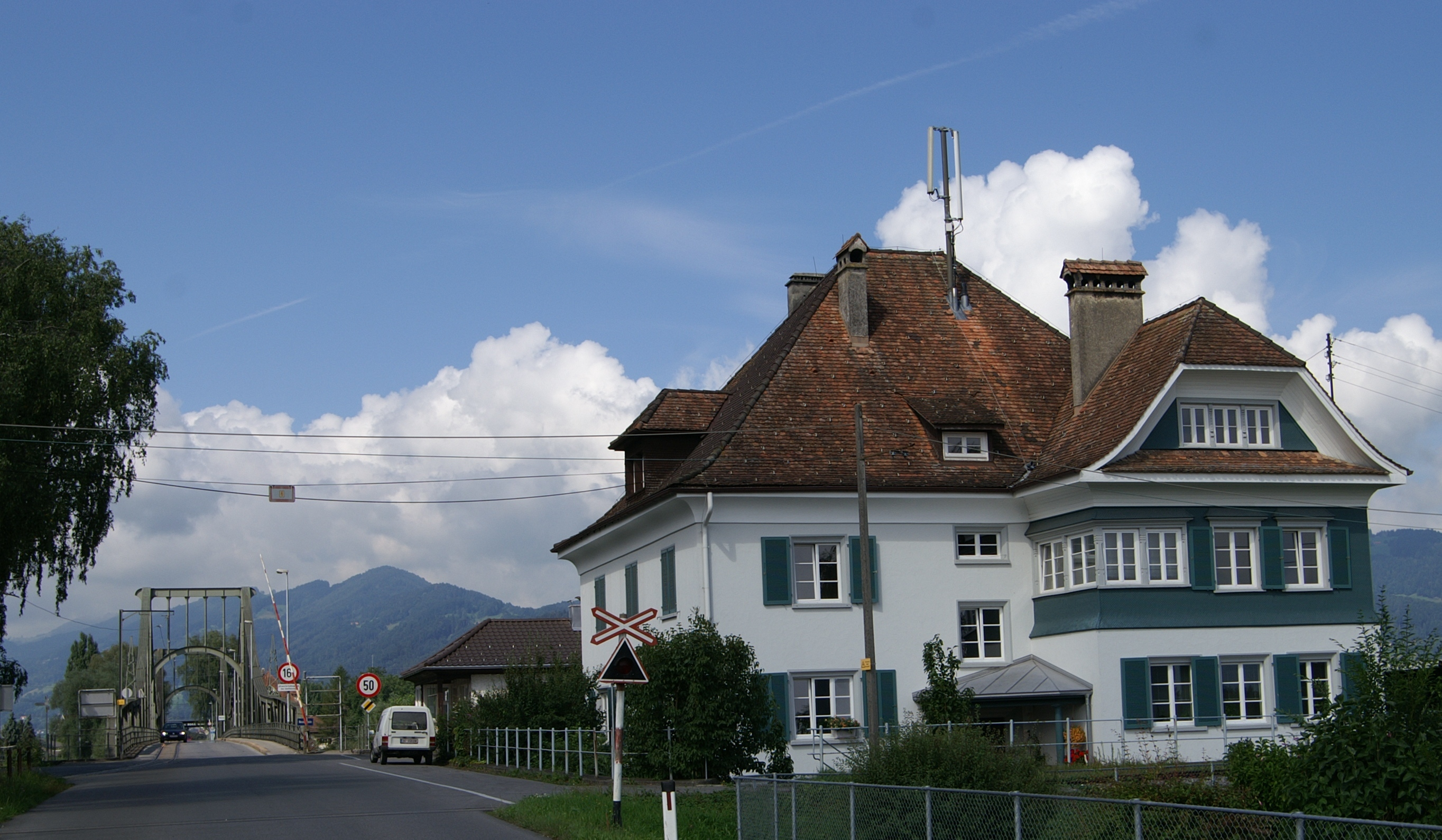

- Coat of arms
- Location of Widnau
- Location within Switzerland Location within Canton of St. Gallen
- Coordinates: 47°24′N 9°38′E
- Country: Switzerland
- Canton: St. Gallen
- District: Rheintal

Government
  - Mayor: Bruno Seelos (The Liberals)

Area
  - Total: 4.20 km^{2} (1.62 sq mi)
- Elevation: 405 m (1,329 ft)

Population (December 2020)
  - Total: 9,932
  - Density: 2,360/km^{2} (6,120/sq mi)
- Time zone: UTC+01:00 (CET)
  - Summer (DST): UTC+02:00 (CEST)
- Postal code: 9443
- SFOS number: 3238
- ISO 3166 code: CH-SG
- Surrounded by: Au, Balgach, Diepoldsau, Lustenau (AT-8)
- Website: widnau.ch

Widnau is a municipality in the Wahlkreis (constituency) of Rheintal in the canton of St. Gallen in Switzerland.

== History ==
Aerial view (1954)

In 1883 the municipality was created when it separated from Diepoldsau.

== Geography ==
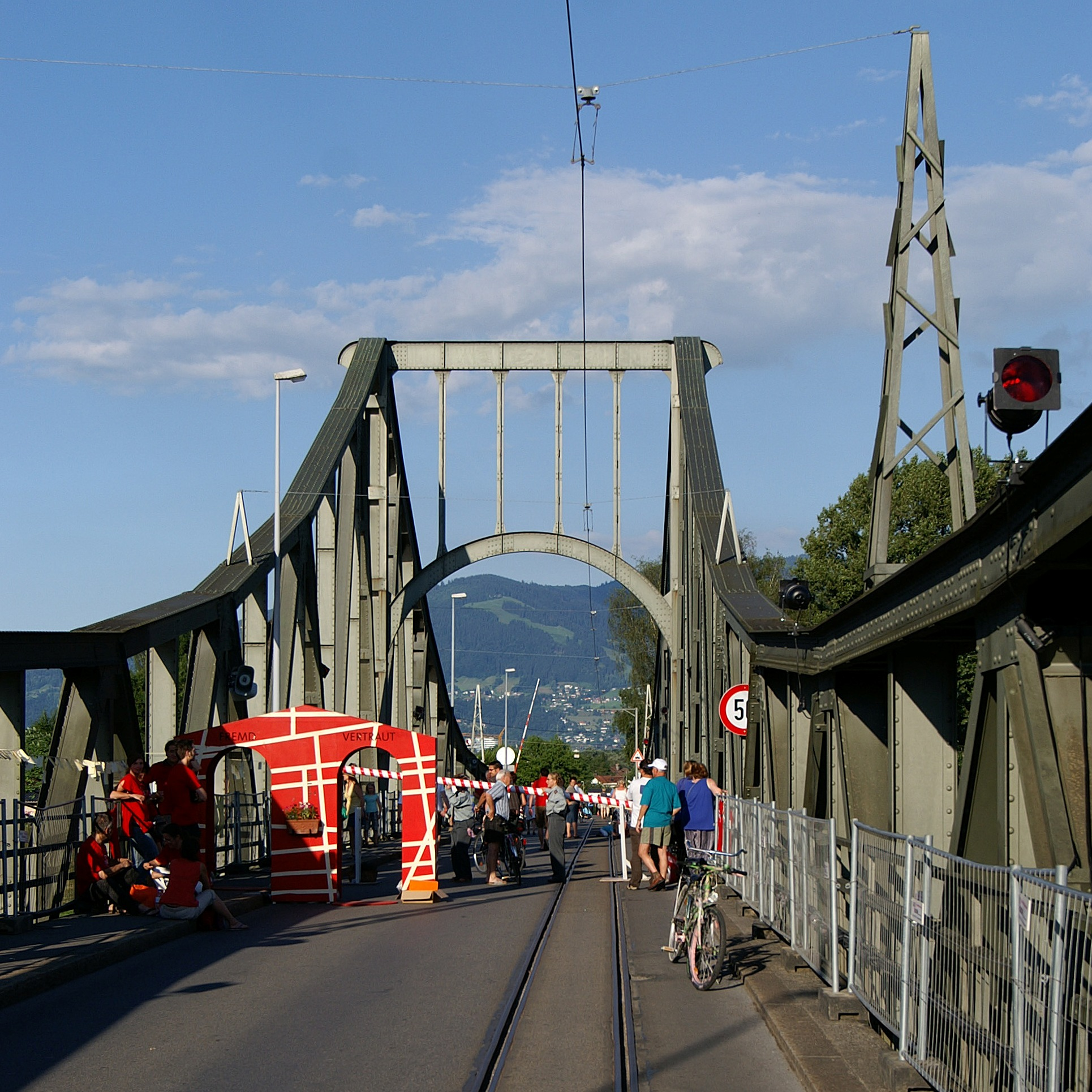
Wiesenrain bridge over the Rhine, between Switzerland and Austria

Widnau has an area, as of 2006, of 4.2 km^{2} (1.6 sq mi). Of this area, 34.2% is used for agricultural purposes, while 2.4% is forested. Of the rest of the land, 59.4% is settled (buildings or roads) and the remainder (4%) is non-productive (rivers or lakes).

It is on the Austrian border and has a border crossing via the Wiesenrainbrücke, a bridge over the Rhine. This road bridge also carries a track of the International Rhine Regulation Railway, a now preserved rail line formerly used in the management of the Rhine.

== Coat of arms ==
The blazon of the municipal coat of arms is Or a bar wavy Azure base seme of Tufts Vert and overall a Willow pollarded of the last eradicated and trunked Gules.

== Demographics ==
Widnau has a population (as of 31 December 2020) of 9,932. As of 2007, about 25.0% of the population was made up of foreign nationals. Of the foreign population, (as of 2000), 153 are from Germany, 205 are from Italy, 685 are from ex-Yugoslavia, 246 are from Austria, 165 are from Turkey, and 322 are from another country. Over the last 10 years the population has grown at a rate of 12.9%. Most of the population (as of 2000) speaks German (88.0%), with Albanian being second most common ( 2.8%) and Serbo-Croatian being third ( 1.7%). Of the Swiss national languages (as of 2000), 6,574 speak German, 22 people speak French, 117 people speak Italian, and 8 people speak Romansh.

The age distribution, as of 2000, in Widnau is; 1,041 children or 13.9% of the population are between 0 and 9 years old and 990 teenagers or 13.3% are between 10 and 19. Of the adult population, 942 people or 12.6% of the population are between 20 and 29 years old. 1,336 people or 17.9% are between 30 and 39, 1,031 people or 13.8% are between 40 and 49, and 905 people or 12.1% are between 50 and 59. The senior population distribution is 604 people or 8.1% of the population are between 60 and 69 years old, 424 people or 5.7% are between 70 and 79, there are 179 people or 2.4% who are between 80 and 89, and there are 18 people or 0.2% who are between 90 and 99.

In 2000 there were 809 persons (or 10.8% of the population) who were living alone in a private dwelling. There were 1,637 (or 21.9%) persons who were part of a couple (married or otherwise committed) without children, and 4,299 (or 57.6%) who were part of a couple with children. There were 461 (or 6.2%) people who lived in single parent home, while there are 55 persons who were adult children living with one or both parents, 40 persons who lived in a household made up of relatives, 58 who lived household made up of unrelated persons, and 111 who are either institutionalized or live in another type of collective housing.

In the 2007 federal election the most popular party was the SVP which received 42.9% of the vote. The next three most popular parties were the CVP (24.9%), the FDP (11.5%) and the SP (9.9%).

In Widnau about 70.4% of the population (between age 25–64) have completed either non-mandatory upper secondary education or additional higher education (either university or a Fachhochschule). Out of the total population in Widnau, as of 2000, the highest education level completed by 1,528 people (20.5% of the population) was Primary, while 2,736 (36.6%) have completed their secondary education, 786 (10.5%) have attended a Tertiary school, and 314 (4.2%) are not in school. The remainder did not answer this question.

== Economy ==
As of 2007, Widnau had an unemployment rate of 2.44%. As of 2005, there were 19 people employed in the primary economic sector and about 9 businesses involved in this sector. 1,135 people are employed in the secondary sector and there are 111 businesses in this sector. 1,553 people are employed in the tertiary sector, with 272 businesses in this sector.

As of October 2009 the average unemployment rate was 4.1%. There were 413 businesses in the municipality of which 114 were involved in the secondary sector of the economy while 296 were involved in the third.

As of 2000 there were 1,313 residents who worked in the municipality, while 2,590 residents worked outside Widnau and 1,731 people commuted into the municipality for work.

== Religion ==
From the 2000 census, 4,773 or 63.9% were Roman Catholic, while 1,181 or 15.8% belonged to the Swiss Reformed Church. Of the rest of the population, there were 2 individuals (or about 0.03% of the population) who belonged to the Christian Catholic faith, there were 175 individuals (or about 2.34% of the population) who belonged to the Orthodox Church, and there were 61 individuals (or about 0.82% of the population) who belonged to another Christian church. There were 3 individuals (or about 0.04% of the population) who were Jewish, and 619 (or about 8.29% of the population) who were Islamic. There were 32 individuals (or about 0.43% of the population) who belonged to another church (not listed on the census), and 340 (or about 4.55% of the population) belonged to no church, were agnostic or atheist. The remaining 284 individuals (or about 3.80% of the population) did not answer the question.

== Weather ==
Widnau has an average of 137.8 days of rain or snow per year and on average receives 1,192 mm (46.9 in) of precipitation. The wettest month is July during which time Widnau receives an average of 159 mm (6.3 in) of rain or snow. During this month there is precipitation for an average of 13.3 days. The month with the most days of precipitation is June, with an average of 14.2, but with only 149 mm (5.9 in) of rain or snow. The driest month of the year is March with an average of 62 mm (2.4 in) of precipitation over 13.3 days.
