= Au, St. Gallen =

Au
- Municipality
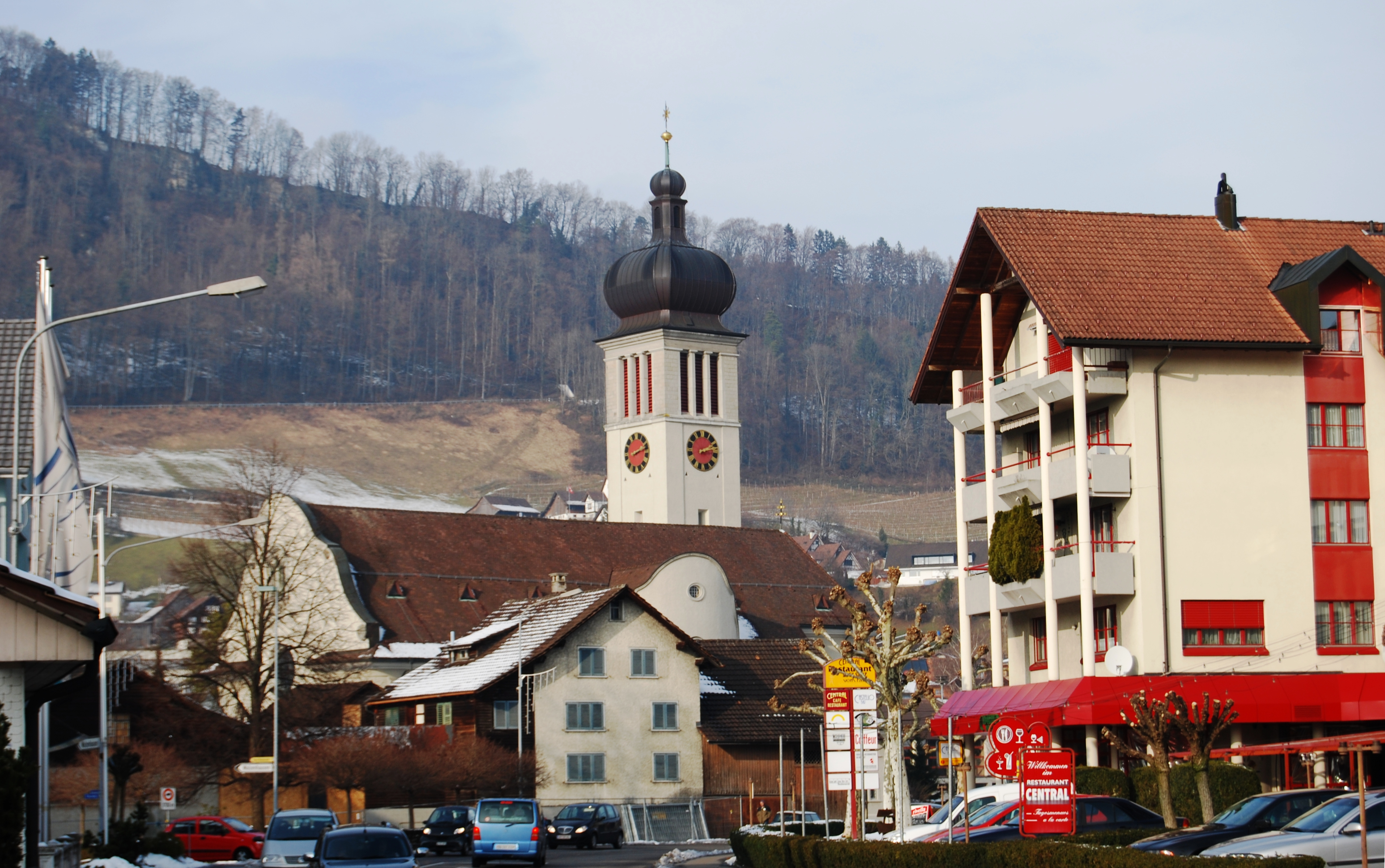

- Flag Coat of arms
- Location of Au
- Location within Switzerland Location within Canton of St. Gallen
- Coordinates: 47°26′N 9°38′E
- Country: Switzerland
- Canton: St. Gallen
- District: Rheintal

Government
  - Mayor: Dr. Walter Grob

Area
  - Total: 4.69 km^{2} (1.81 sq mi)
- Elevation: 405 m (1,329 ft)

Population (December 2020)
  - Total: 7,984
  - Density: 1,700/km^{2} (4,410/sq mi)
- Time zone: UTC+01:00 (CET)
  - Summer (DST): UTC+02:00 (CEST)
- Postal code: 9434
- SFOS number: 3231
- ISO 3166 code: CH-SG
- Surrounded by: Balgach, Berneck, Lustenau (AT-8), Sankt Margrethen, Walzenhausen (AR), Widnau
- Website: www.au.sg.ch

Au (German pronunciation: [aʊ]) is a municipality in the Wahlkreis (constituency) of Rheintal in the canton of St. Gallen in Switzerland.

== History ==
Au is first mentioned in 1316 as Diken Auwe.

== Coat of arms ==
The blazon of the municipal coat of arms is Azure a Crescent Or in bend issuant behind a Cliff Argent.

== Geography ==
Aerial view (1947)

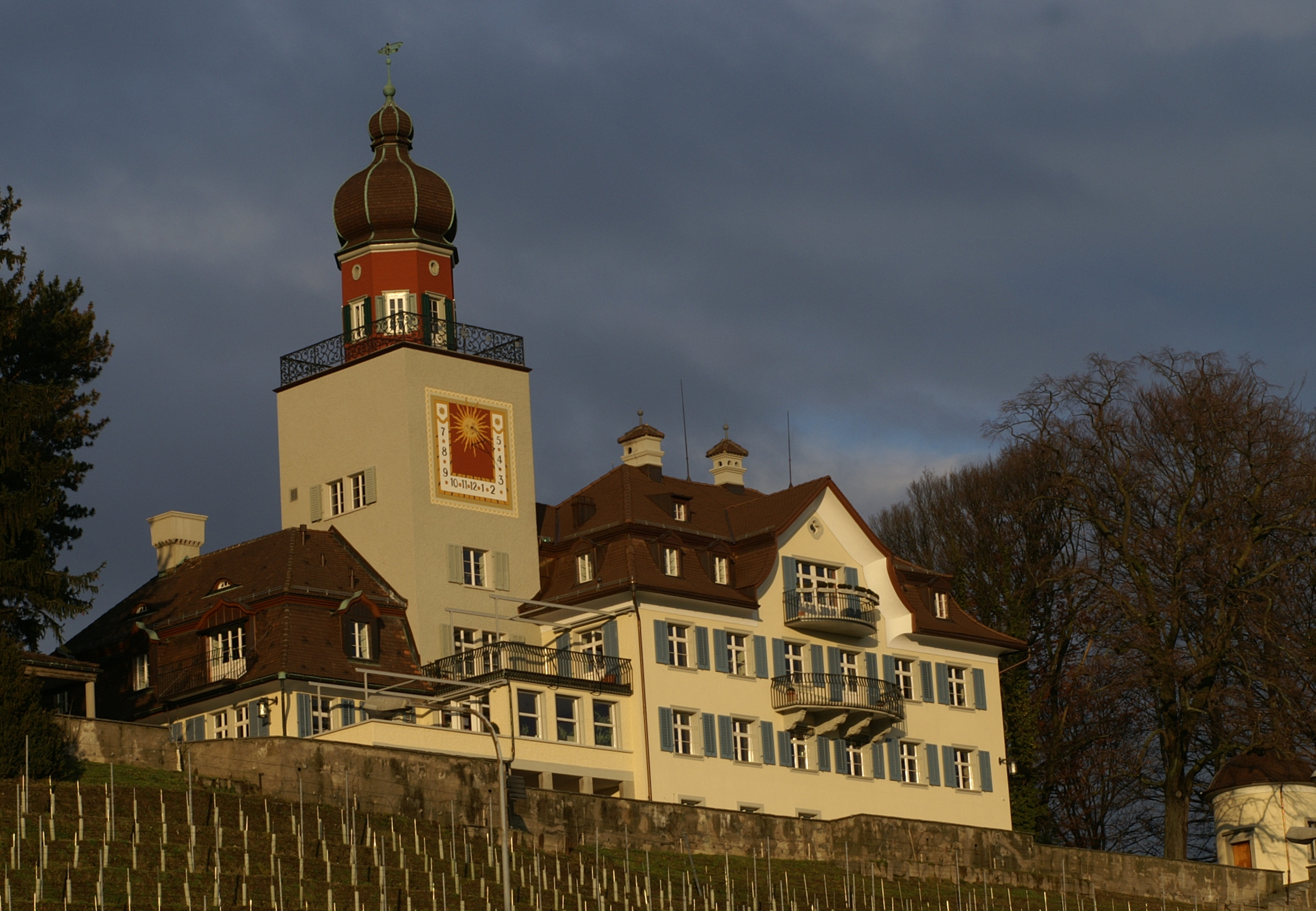
Heerbrugg castle

Au has an area, as of 2006, of 4.7 km^{2} (1.8 sq mi). Of this area, 42% is used for agricultural purposes, while 4.2% is forested. Of the rest of the land, 47.8% is settled (buildings or roads) and the remainder (5.9%) is non-productive (rivers or lakes).

The municipality was part of the Unterrheintal district until the creation of the Rheintal Wahlkreis. It is located in a narrow pass between Heldsberg and the Rhein river. It consists of the village of Au and the hamlets of Haslach, Hard and Monstein as well as a portion of the village of Heerbrugg.

== Demographics ==
Au has a population (as of 31 December 2020) of 7,984. As of 2007, about 33.3% of the population was made up of foreign nationals. Of the foreign population, (as of 2000), 192 are from Germany, 398 are from Italy, 580 are from ex-Yugoslavia, 334 are from Austria, 121 are from Turkey, and 307 are from another country. Over the last 10 years the population has grown at a rate of 5.7%. Most of the population (as of 2000) speaks German (87.0%), with Italian being second most common (3.0%) and Albanian being third (2.5%). Of the Swiss national languages (as of 2000), 5,577 speak German, 21 people speak French, 190 people speak Italian, and 7 people speak Romansh.

The age distribution, as of 2000, in Au is: 750 children or 11.7% of the population are between 0 and 9 years old and 792 teenagers or 12.4% are between 10 and 19. Of the adult population, 829 people or 12.9% of the population are between 20 and 29 years old. 1,066 people or 16.6% are between 30 and 39, 928 people or 14.5% are between 40 and 49, and 769 people or 12.0% are between 50 and 59. The senior population distribution is 656 people or 10.2% of the population are between 60 and 69 years old, 398 people or 6.2% are between 70 and 79, there are 193 people or 3.0% who are between 80 and 89, and there are 28 people or 0.4% who are between 90 and 99.

In 2000 there were 879 persons (or 13.7% of the population) who were living alone in a private dwelling. There were 1,458 (or 22.7%) persons who were part of a couple (married or otherwise committed) without children, and 3,475 (or 54.2%) who were part of a couple with children. There were 400 (or 6.2%) people who lived in single parent home, while there are 31 persons who were adult children living with one or both parents, 16 persons who lived in a household made up of relatives, 33 who lived household made up of unrelated persons, and 117 who are either institutionalized or live in another type of collective housing.

In the 2007 federal election the most popular party was the SVP which received 39.6% of the vote. The next three most popular parties were the CVP (24.9%), the FDP (12.9%) and the SP (10.8%).

The entire Swiss population is generally well educated. In Au about 69% of the population (between age 25–64) have completed either non-mandatory upper secondary education or additional higher education (either university or a Fachhochschule). Out of the total population in Au, as of 2000, the highest education level completed by 1,459 people (22.8% of the population) was Primary, while 2,500 (39.0%) have completed Secondary, 683 (10.7%) have attended a Tertiary school, and 243 (3.8%) are not in school. The remainder did not answer this question.

The historical population is given in the following table:

year	population
1837	917
1850	875
1900	1,314
1910	2,437
1950	2,636
1970	4,944
1990	5,778^{a}

^a without Heerbrugg population was 3,370

== Economy ==
As of 2007, Au had an unemployment rate of 2.84%. As of 2005, there were 39 people employed in the primary economic sector and about 15 businesses involved in this sector. 2,228 people are employed in the secondary sector and there are 93 businesses in this sector. 2,013 people are employed in the tertiary sector, with 288 businesses in this sector.

As of October 2009 the average unemployment rate was 5.6%. There were 424 businesses in the municipality of which 103 were involved in the secondary sector of the economy while 307 were involved in the third.

As of 2000 there were 1,254 residents who worked in the municipality, while 2,127 residents worked outside Au and 3,720 people commuted into the municipality for work.

== Religion ==
From the 2000 census, 3,589 or 56.0% are Roman Catholic, while 1,406 or 21.9% belonged to the Swiss Reformed Church. Of the rest of the population, there is 1 individual who belongs to the Christian Catholic faith, there are 113 individuals (or about 1.76% of the population) who belong to the Orthodox Church, and there are 121 individuals (or about 1.89% of the population) who belong to another Christian church. There is 1 individual who is Jewish, and 529 (or about 8.25% of the population) who are Islamic. There are 38 individuals (or about 0.59% of the population) who belong to another church (not listed on the census), 411 (or about 6.41% of the population) belong to no church, are agnostic or atheist, and 200 individuals (or about 3.12% of the population) did not answer the question.

== Sights ==
The shared, urbanized village of Balgach/Herrbrugg, which is shared between Au (SG), Balgach and Berneck, is designated as part of the Inventory of Swiss Heritage Sites.

== See also ==
- Au SG railway station
