= Munich School of Philosophy =

Jesuit higher education college in Munich, Bavaria, Germany

- Hochschule für Philosophie München
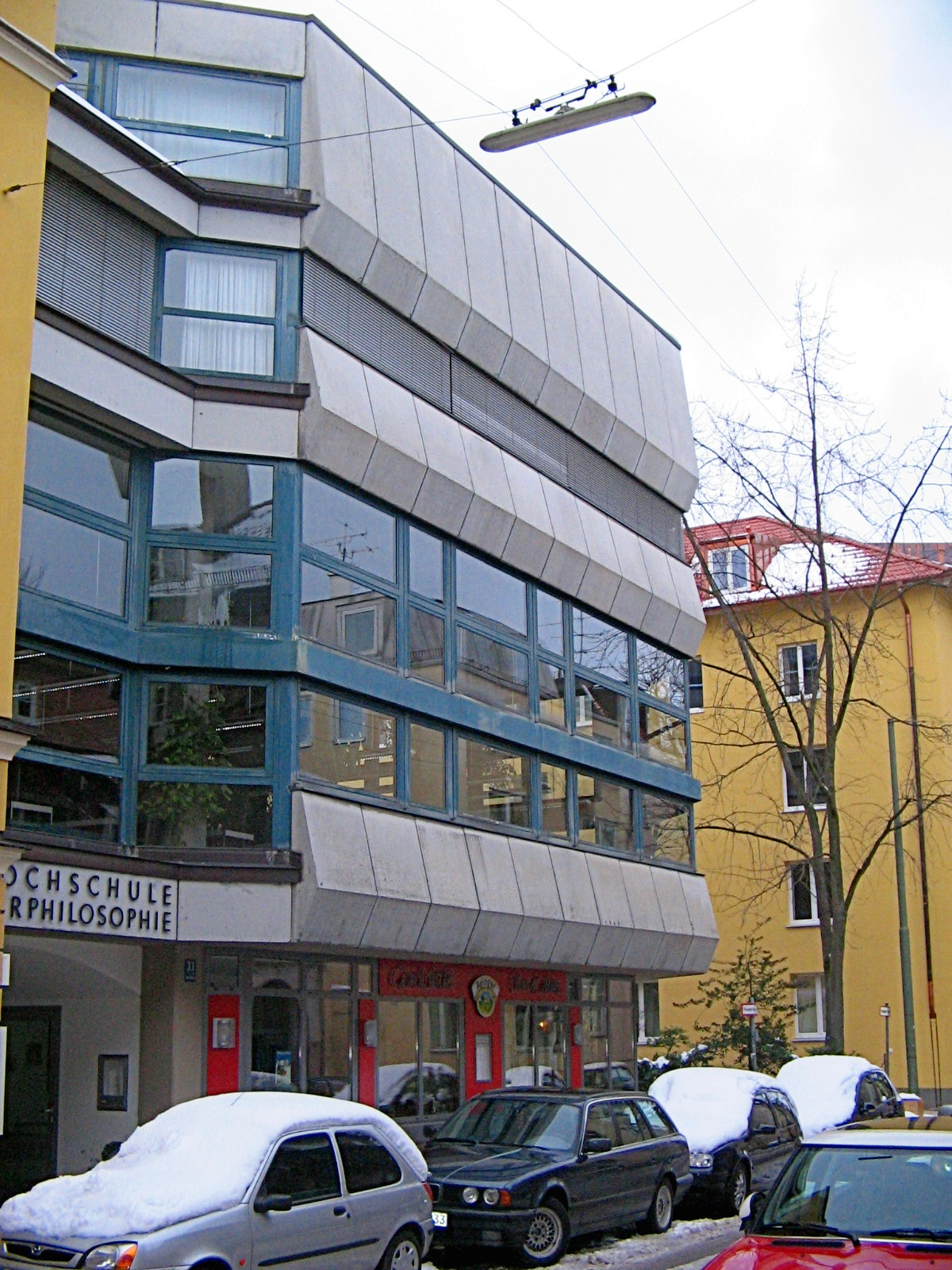
- Type: Private
- Established: 1925
- Affiliations: Roman Catholic (Jesuits)
- President: Johannes Wallacher
- Academic staff: 54
- Students: 560
- Location: Munich, Germany
- Website: www.hfph.de
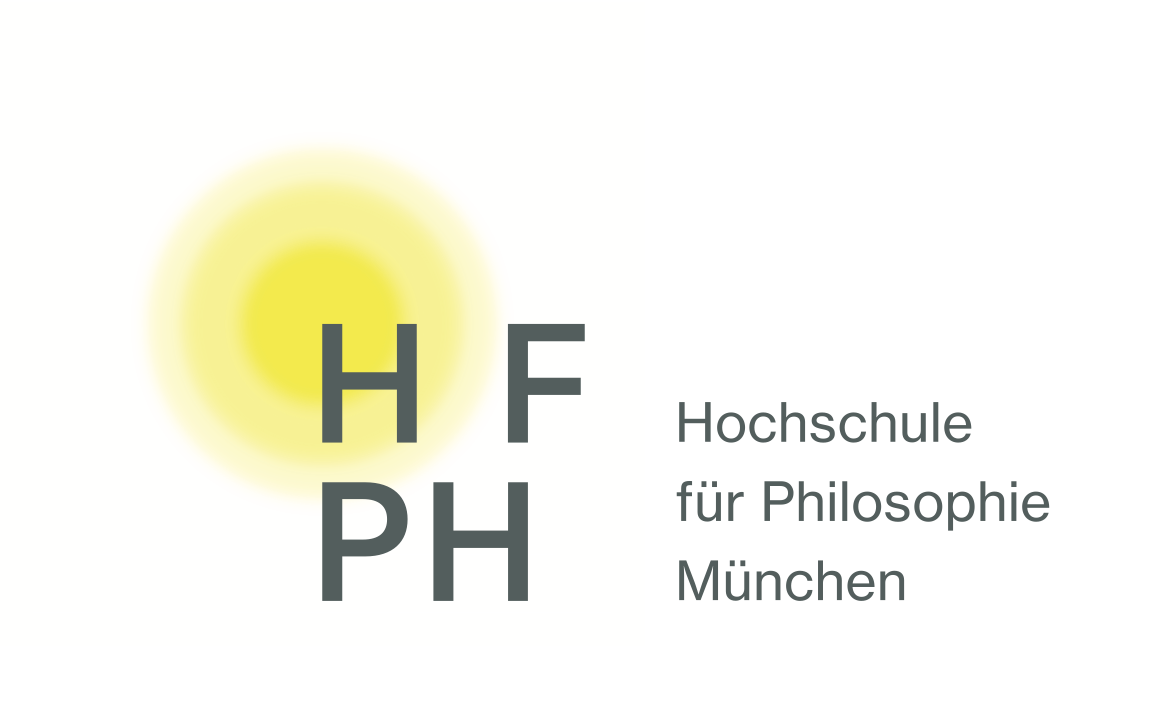

Munich School of Philosophy (German: Hochschule für Philosophie München) is a small Jesuit higher education college in Munich, Germany founded in 1925.

== History ==
Founded as a seminary at Pullach in 1925 by Augustin Bea, first named the Berchmanskolleg, it obtained the ability to issue a doctorate in 1932. In 1971 the school moved to central Munich and opened to non-Jesuit students. The majority of students are not members of the Jesuit Order, and now include women and international students. It is accredited by the Bavarian State Ministry of Sciences, Research and the Arts (in German: Bayerisches Staatsministerium für Wissenschaft, Forschung und Kunst).

Since 2009, the Munich School of Philosophy hosts the yearly Rahner Lecture in memory of the German Jesuit and theologian Karl Rahner.

== Philosophical tradition ==
Most faculty members are Jesuits. The school has long stood in the tradition of Neo-Scholasticism. Only since the 1970s, when the school opened to non-Jesuit students, contemporary philosophy such as marxism, phenomenology and analytic philosophy have gained more prominence in the undergraduate and postgraduate education. To date, the undergraduate curriculum at the Munich School of Philosophy places much emphasis on the history of philosophy and issues pertaining to the study of religion.

As a Jesuit school, its objectives and purpose must be in accord with the apostolic constitution Sapientia Christiana, Art. 79 and 80 in research and teaching:

1. to promote the study of philosophy and its history;
2. to reflect systematically on fundamental issues of religious faith and to elucidate the affiliation between philosophy and theology;
3. to analyze and develop the contributions of other sciences towards philosophy;
4. to apply the insights gained from these theoretical endeavors to practical concerns of human and social life.

== Notable alumni and faculty members ==
=== Faculty ===
Harald Lesch is a German physicist, astronomer, natural philosopher, author, television presenter, and professor of physics at LMU Munich and lecturer of natural philosophy at the Munich School of Philosophy.

=== Alumni ===
==== Politics ====
- Erwin Teufel, former minister-president of Baden-Württemberg
- Heiner Geißler, German politician and former federal minister from 1982 to 1985

==== Clergy ====
- Alfred Delp
- Rudolf Voderholzer
- Albert Ziegler SJ, Swiss theologian, ethicist and author

== Research centers ==
The Munich School of Philosophy has six distinctive research centers:

- Institute for Social and Development Studies (German: Institut für Gesellschaftspolitik/IGP)
- Institute for Communications and Media Research (German: Institut für Kommunikationswissenschaft und Erwachsenenpädagogik/IKE)
- Institute for Philosophy of Religion (German: Institut für Religionsphilosophie/IRP)
- Institute for Scientific Issues related to Philosophy and Theology (German: Institut für naturwissenschaftliche Grenzfragen zur Philosophie und Theologie/ING)
- Institute for Philosophy and Leadership (German: Institut für Philosophie und Leadership)
- Rottendorf Project (German: Rottendorf Projekt)

== Rankings ==
The Munich School of Philosophy is currently not ranked in any major university web rankings due to its specialization in philosophy. It frequently cooperates with faculty members of two Munich universities, the Technical University of Munich and LMU Munich which are both consistently ranked among Germany's foremost universities.

== See also ==
- Sankt Georgen Graduate School of Philosophy and Theology
- Catholic University of Eichstätt-Ingolstadt
- Heythrop College
- European College of Liberal Arts (ECLA)
- List of Jesuit sites
