= Rheintal (Wahlkreis) =

Coordinates: 47.4667°N 9.48333°E

Wahlkreis Rheintal
- Constituency
- Country: Switzerland
- Canton: St. Gallen

Area
  - Total: 138.37 km^{2} (53.42 sq mi)

Population (December 2020)
  - Total: 74,372
  - Density: 537.49/km^{2} (1,392.1/sq mi)
- Time zone: UTC+1 (CET)
  - Summer (DST): UTC+2 (CEST)
- Municipalities: 13

The Wahlkreis Rheintal (English: Rhine Valley) is a constituency (Wahlkreis) of the canton of St. Gallen, Switzerland, formed under the new constitution of the canton on 10 June 2001. It consists largely of the former districts of Oberrheintal and Unterrheintal.

The Wahlrkreis covers almost all the region of Vogtei Rheintal and later Rheintal District.

== Demographics ==
Rheintal has a population of 74,372 (as of 31 December 2020). Of the foreign population, (as of 2000), 1,118 are from Germany, 1,978 are from Italy, 6,222 are from ex-Yugoslavia, 1,684 are from Austria, 850 are from Turkey, and 1,925 are from another country. Of the Swiss national languages (as of 2000), 54,669 speak German, 146 people speak French, 1,226 people speak Italian, and 80 people speak Romansh.

The age distribution, as of 2000, in the Rheintal Wahlkreis is; 8,065 children or 13.1% of the population are between 0 and 9 years old and 8,469 teenagers or 13.7% are between 10 and 19. Of the adult population, 7,630 people or 12.4% of the population are between 20 and 29 years old. 10,289 people or 16.7% are between 30 and 39, 8,619 people or 14.0% are between 40 and 49, and 7,303 people or 11.8% are between 50 and 59. The senior population distribution is 5,310 people or 8.6% of the population are between 60 and 69 years old, 3,786 people or 6.1% are between 70 and 79, there are 1,883 people or 3.1% who are between 80 and 89, and there are 289 people or 0.5% who are between 90 and 99, and 1 person who is 100 or more.

In 2000 there were 6,996 persons (or 11.3% of the population) who were living alone in a private dwelling. There were 13,031 (or 21.1%) persons who were part of a couple (married or otherwise committed) without children, and 35,575 (or 57.7%) who were part of a couple with children. There were 3,384 (or 5.5%) people who lived in single parent home, while there are 431 persons who were adult children living with one or both parents, 255 persons who lived in a household made up of relatives, 364 who lived household made up of unrelated persons, and 1,608 who are either institutionalized or live in another type of collective housing.

Out of the total population in the Rheintal region, as of 2000, the highest education level completed by 14,056 people (22.8% of the population) was Primary, while 22,279 (36.1%) have completed Secondary, 5,708 (9.3%) have attended a Tertiary school, and 2,739 (4.4%) are not in school. The remainder did not answer this question.

As of October 2009 the average unemployment rate was 4.2%.

From the 2000 census, 35,215 or 57.1% are Roman Catholic, while 13,723 or 22.3% belonged to the Swiss Reformed Church. Of the rest of the population, there are 27 individuals (or about 0.04% of the population) who belong to the Christian Catholic faith, there are 1,202 individuals (or about 1.95% of the population) who belong to the Orthodox Church, and there are 1,066 individuals (or about 1.73% of the population) who belong to another Christian church. There are 14 individuals (or about 0.02% of the population) who are Jewish, and 5,155 (or about 8.36% of the population) who are Islamic. There are 344 individuals (or about 0.56% of the population) who belong to another church (not listed on the census), 2,976 (or about 4.83% of the population) belong to no church, are agnostic or atheist, and 1,922 individuals (or about 3.12% of the population) did not answer the question.

== Municipalities ==
The population has a population of 74,372 (as of 31 December 2020), living within 13 municipalities:

Municipality	Population 31 December 2020	Area (km^{2})	BFS
Altstätten	11,938	39.11	3251
Au	7,984	4.69	3231
Balgach	4,942	6.52	3232
Berneck	3,928	5.63	3233
Diepoldsau	6,479	11.23	3234
Eichberg	1,554	5.43	3252
Marbach	2,139	4.42	3253
Oberriet	8,996	34.51	3254
Rebstein	4,640	4.26	3255
Rheineck	3,404	2.18	3235
Rüthi	2,445	9.34	3256
St. Margrethen	5,991	6.85	3236
Widnau	9,932	4.20	3238
Total (13)	74,372	138.37	1723
