= Cantonal Council of St. Gallen =

Parliament of the Canton of Sankt Gallen, Switzerland

Cantonal Council of St. Gallen St. Galler Kantonsrat

Type
- Type: Unicameral

Leadership
- President: Walter Freund, SVP

Structure
- Seats: 120
- Political groups: SVP (41) The Centre (27) FDP (19) SP (18) GLP (6) Greens (6) EVP (2) EDU (1)

Elections
- Last election: 3 March 2024
- Next election: 2028

Meeting place
- Abbey of Saint Gall, St. Gallen

Website
- Official website

The Cantonal Council of St. Gallen (German: St. Galler Kantonsrat) is the legislature of the Canton of St. Gallen in Switzerland. St. Gallen has a unicameral legislature. The Cantonal Council has 120 seats which are elected every three years.

== See also ==
- List of cantonal legislatures of Switzerland
