= Balgach =

- Municipality
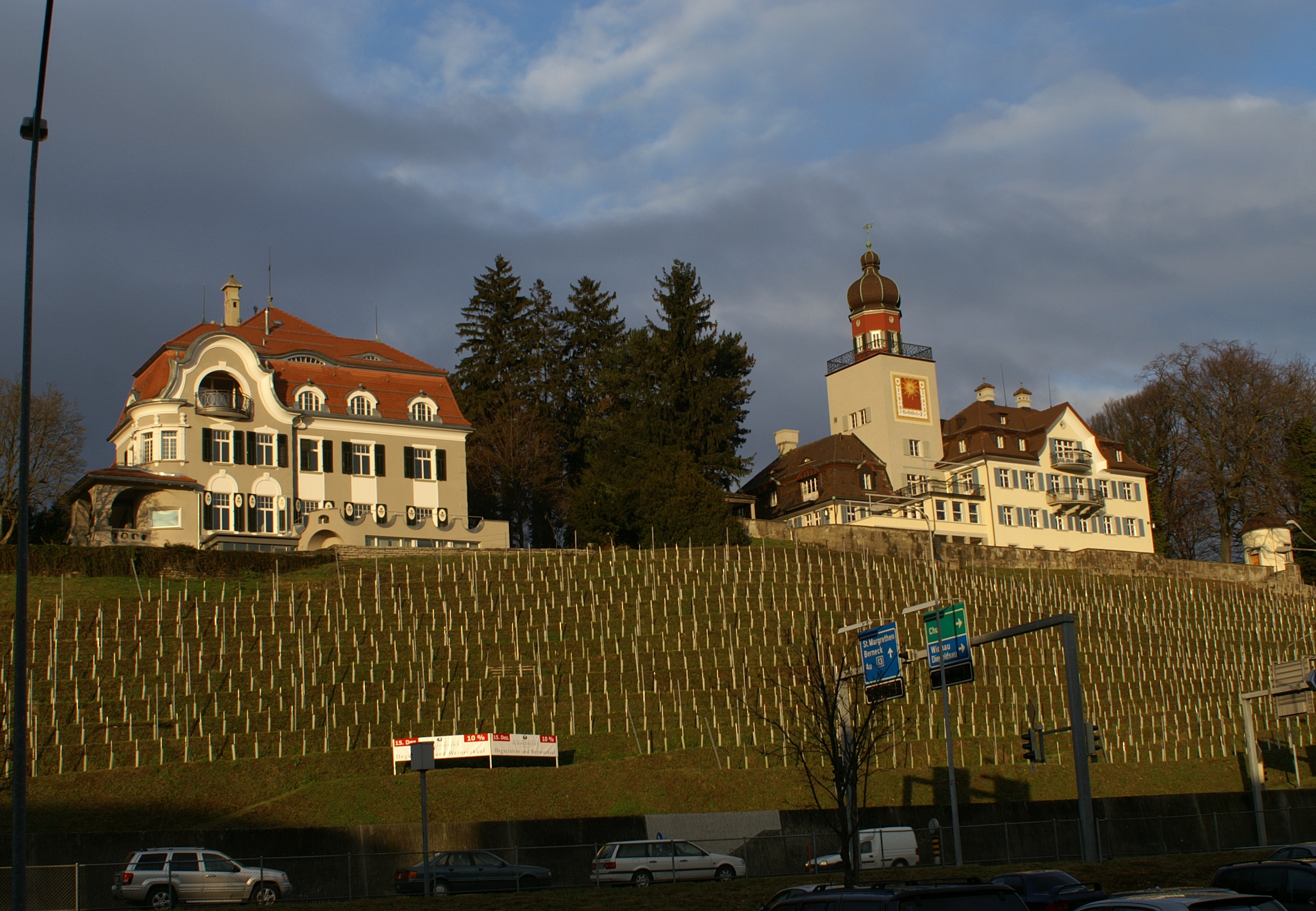

- Coat of arms
- Location of Balgach
- Location within Switzerland Location within Canton of St. Gallen
- Coordinates: 47°24′N 9°36′E
- Country: Switzerland
- Canton: St. Gallen
- District: Rheintal

Government
  - Mayor: Silvia Troxler

Area
  - Total: 6.52 km^{2} (2.52 sq mi)
- Elevation: 404 m (1,325 ft)

Population (December 2020)
  - Total: 4,942
  - Density: 758/km^{2} (1,960/sq mi)
- Time zone: UTC+01:00 (CET)
  - Summer (DST): UTC+02:00 (CEST)
- Postal code: 9436
- SFOS number: 3232
- ISO 3166 code: CH-SG
- Surrounded by: Au, Berneck, Diepoldsau, Oberegg (AI), Oberriet, Rebstein, Reute (AR), Widnau
- Website: www.balgach.ch

Balgach (Alemannic: Balge) is a municipality in the Wahlkreis (constituency) of Rheintal in the canton of St. Gallen in Switzerland.

== History ==
Balgach is first mentioned about 890-91 as Palgaa.

== Coat of arms ==
The blazon of the municipal coat of arms is Per fess Or a Semi Lion rampant issuant Gules and Vert two Bars Argent.

== Geography ==
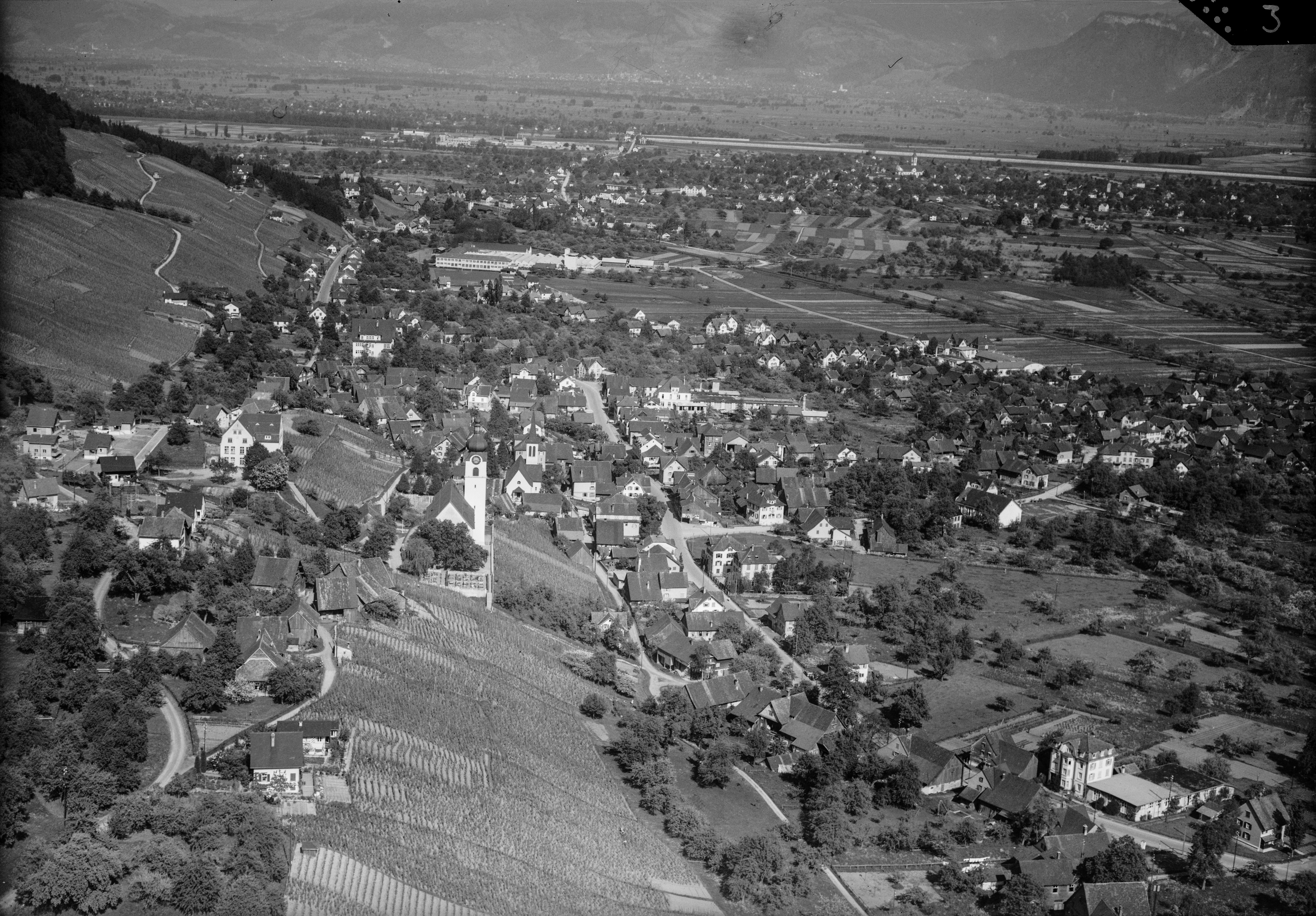
Aerial view (1947)

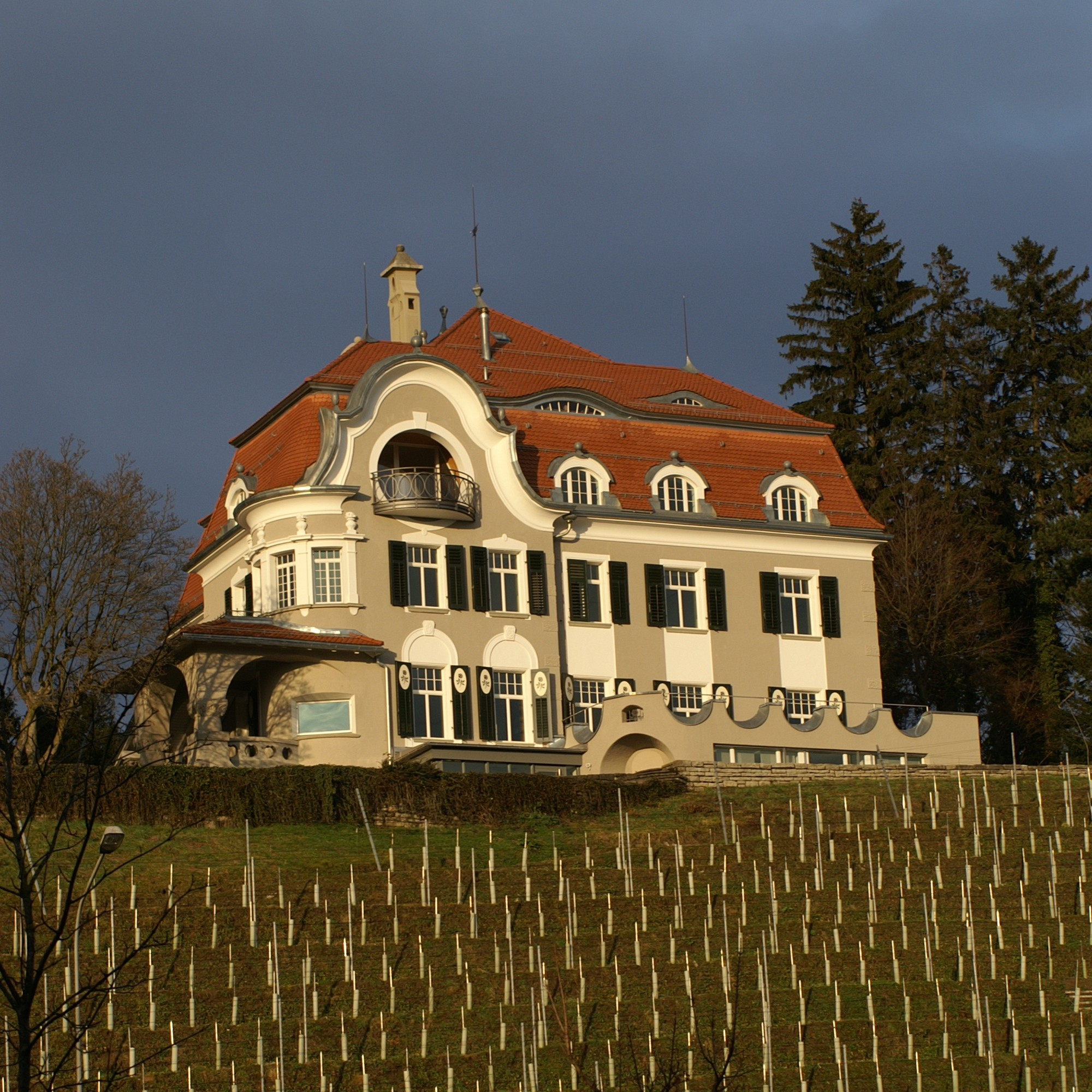
Balgach villa, a 17th-century Art Nouveau villa near Balgach

Balgach has an area, as of 2006, of 6.5 km^{2} (2.5 sq mi). Of this area, 56.1% is used for agricultural purposes, while 19.7% is forested. Of the rest of the land, 23.2% is settled (buildings or roads) and the remainder (0.9%) is non-productive (rivers or lakes).

The municipality was part of the former Unterrheintal district before the creation of the Rheintal Wahlkreis. It is located at the base of the Appenzell hill country and along the main road between St. Margrethen and Altstätten. It consists of the village of Balgach and a portion of the village of Heerbrugg.

== Demographics ==
Balgach has a population (as of 31 December 2020) of 4,942. As of 2007, about 21.8% of the population was made up of foreign nationals. Of the foreign population, (as of 2000), 77 are from Germany, 96 are from Italy, 374 are from ex-Yugoslavia, 104 are from Austria, 102 are from Turkey, and 130 are from another country. Over the last 10 years the population has grown at a rate of 3.7%. Most of the population (as of 2000) speaks German (89.1%), with Serbo-Croatian being second most common ( 2.9%) and Albanian being third ( 1.8%). Of the Swiss national languages (as of 2000) 3,584 speak German, 15 people speak French, 65 people speak Italian, and 4 people speak Romansh.

The age distribution, as of 2000, in Balgach is; 513 children or 12.7% of the population are between 0 and 9 years old and 528 teenagers or 13.1% are between 10 and 19. Of the adult population, 457 people or 11.4% of the population are between 20 and 29 years old. 720 people or 17.9% are between 30 and 39, 539 people or 13.4% are between 40 and 49, and 439 people or 10.9% are between 50 and 59. The senior population distribution is 381 people or 9.5% of the population are between 60 and 69 years old, 279 people or 6.9% are between 70 and 79, there are 151 people or 3.8% who are between 80 and 89, and there are 17 people or 0.4% who are between 90 and 99.

In 2000 there were 422 persons (or 10.5% of the population) who were living alone in a private dwelling. There were 940 (or 23.4%) persons who were part of a couple (married or otherwise committed) without children, and 2,224 (or 55.3%) who were part of a couple with children. There were 199 (or 4.9%) people who lived in single parent home, while there are 14 persons who were adult children living with one or both parents, 16 persons who lived in a household made up of relatives, 41 who lived household made up of unrelated persons, and 168 who are either institutionalized or live in another type of collective housing.

In the 2007 federal election the most popular party was the SVP which received 33% of the vote. The next three most popular parties were the CVP (23.7%), the FDP (17.9%) and the SP (12%).

The entire Swiss population is generally well educated. In Balgach about 72.8% of the population (between age 25-64) have completed either non-mandatory upper secondary education or additional higher education (either university or a Fachhochschule). Out of the total population in Balgach, as of 2000, the highest education level completed by 804 people (20.0% of the population) was Primary, while 1,495 (37.2%) have completed Secondary, 495 (12.3%) have attended a Tertiary school, and 150 (3.7%) are not in school. The remainder did not answer this question.

The historical population is given in the following table:

| year | population |
|---|---|
| 1850 | 1,435 |
| 1900 | 1,733 |
| 1910 | 2,200 |
| 1950 | 2,644 |
| 1990 | 3,538 |

== Heritage sites of national significance ==
The old Town Hall (Altes Rathaus) at Steigstrasse 17 is listed as a Swiss heritage site of national significance. Additionally, there are two regions which are designated as part of the Inventory of Swiss Heritage Sites. The first is the Schlosslandschaft Ober/Unterrheintal, a concentration of castles that spans Altstätten, Balgach, Berneck and Marbach. The second is the shared, urbanized village of Balgach/Herrbrugg, which is shared between Au (SG), Balgach and Berneck.

== Economy ==
As of 2007, Balgach had an unemployment rate of 1.83%. As of 2005, there were 82 people employed in the primary economic sector and about 26 businesses involved in this sector. 2,350 people are employed in the secondary sector and there are 70 businesses in this sector. 919 people are employed in the tertiary sector, with 115 businesses in this sector.

As of October 2009 the average unemployment rate was 3.6%. There were 226 businesses in the municipality of which 75 were involved in the secondary sector of the economy while 128 were involved in the third.

As of 2000 there were 806 residents who worked in the municipality, while 1,225 residents worked outside Balgach and 2,123 people commuted into the municipality for work.

== Religion ==
From the 2000 census, 1,953 or 48.5% are Roman Catholic, while 1,322 or 32.9% belonged to the Swiss Reformed Church. Of the rest of the population, there are 3 individuals (or about 0.07% of the population) who belong to the Christian Catholic faith, there are 62 individuals (or about 1.54% of the population) who belong to the Orthodox Church, and there are 92 individuals (or about 2.29% of the population) who belong to another Christian church. There is 1 individual who is Jewish, and 292 (or about 7.26% of the population) who are Islamic. There are 5 individuals (or about 0.12% of the population) who belong to another church (not listed on the census), 204 (or about 5.07% of the population) belong to no church, are agnostic or atheist, and 90 individuals (or about 2.24% of the population) did not answer the question.
