= Municipalities of the canton of St. Gallen =

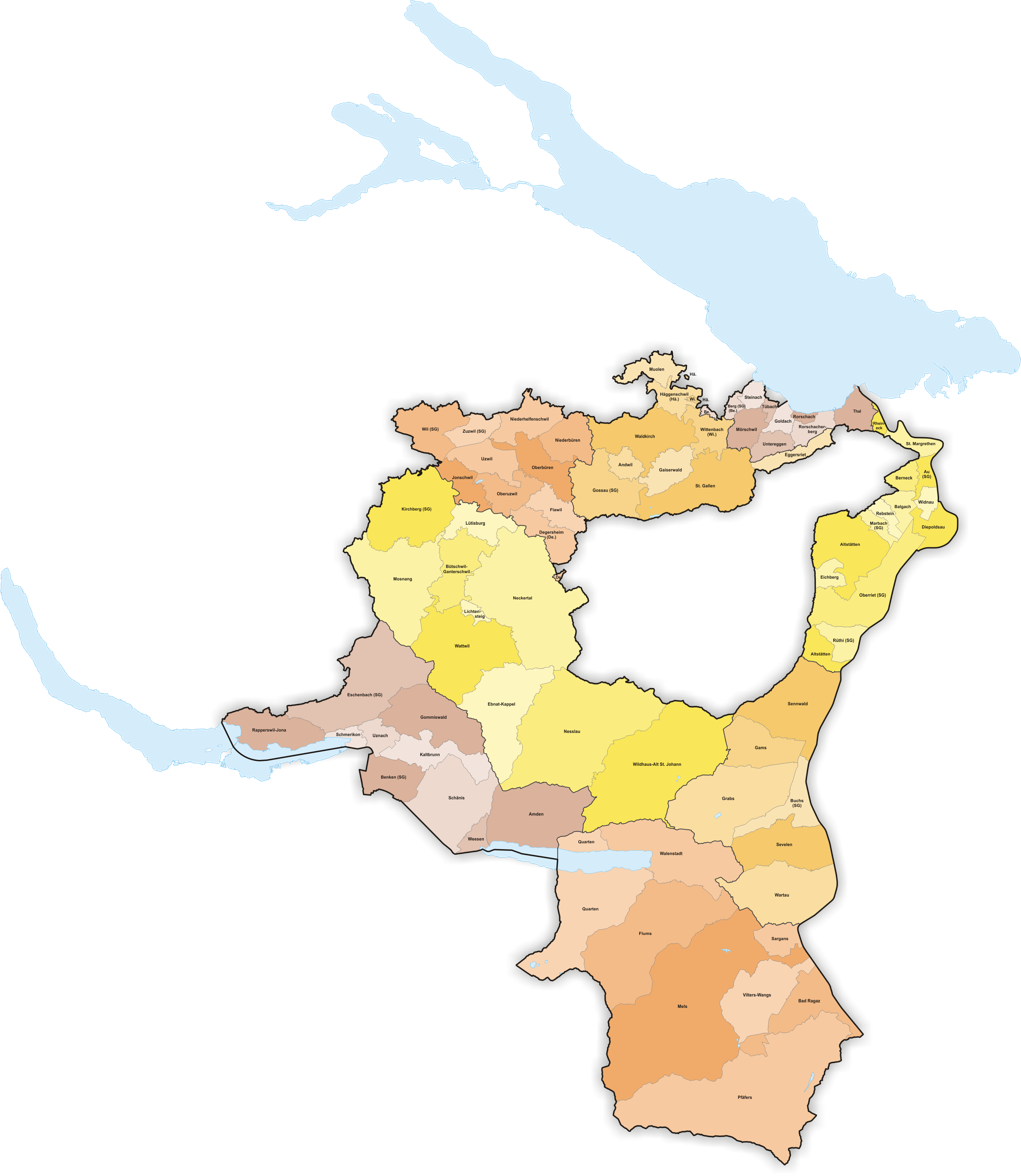
Municipalities in the canton of St. Gallen

The following are the 75 municipalities of the canton of St. Gallen, (as of January 2023).

== List ==
- Altstätten
- Amden
- Andwil
- Au, St. Gallen
- Bad Ragaz
- Balgach
- Benken, St. Gallen
- Berg, St. Gallen
- Berneck
- Buchs, St. Gallen
- Bütschwil-Ganterschwil
- Degersheim
- Diepoldsau
- Ebnat-Kappel
- Eggersriet
- Eichberg
- Eschenbach, St. Gallen
- Flawil
- Flums
- Gaiserwald
- Gams
- Goldach
- Gommiswald
- Gossau, St. Gallen
- Grabs
- Häggenschwil
- Jonschwil
- Kaltbrunn
- Kirchberg, St. Gallen
- Lichtensteig
- Lütisburg
- Marbach, St. Gallen
- Mels
- Mörschwil
- Mosnang
- Muolen
- Neckertal
- Nesslau
- Niederbüren
- Niederhelfenschwil
- Oberbüren
- Oberriet
- Oberuzwil
- Pfäfers
- Quarten
- Rapperswil-Jona
- Rebstein
- Rheineck
- Rorschach
- Rorschacherberg
- Rüthi
- Sargans
- Schänis
- Schmerikon
- Sennwald
- Sevelen
- St. Gallen
- St. Margrethen
- Steinach
- Thal
- Tübach
- Untereggen
- Uznach
- Uzwil
- Vilters-Wangs
- Waldkirch
- Walenstadt
- Wartau
- Wattwil
- Weesen
- Widnau
- Wil, St. Gallen
- Wildhaus-Alt St. Johann
- Wittenbach
- Zuzwil, St. Gallen
