= Wartegg =

Wartegg may refer to:

== People ==
- Ernst von Hesse-Wartegg (1851–1918), Austrian-American writer

== Places ==
- Kapelle Wilen Wartegg, a church in Rorschacherberg, Switzerland
- Wartegg Castle, a castle in Rorschacherberg, Switzerland
- Villa Wartegg, a mansion in Goldach, Switzerland
