= Erat =

Erat or ERAT may be:

- Martin Erat, Czech hockey player
- Roman Erat, Czech hockey player
- Ruth Erat, Swiss teacher, author, painter, and politician
- Tuğrul Erat, Azerbaijani association footballer
- Acronym for environmentally responsible air transport; see aviation and the environment
