= Rorschach (Wahlkreis) =

Coordinates: 47°28′42″N 9°29′33″E

Rorschach Wahlkreis Rorschach
- Constituency
- Country: Switzerland
- Canton: St. Gallen

Area
  - Total: 50.37 km^{2} (19.45 sq mi)

Population (December 2020)
  - Total: 43,928
  - Density: 872.1/km^{2} (2,259/sq mi)
- Time zone: UTC+1 (CET)
  - Summer (DST): UTC+2 (CEST)
- Municipalities: 9

Rorschach is a constituency (Wahlkreis) in the canton of St. Gallen, in Switzerland, which (SFOS number 1722) was established on June 10, 2001. It has 40,454 inhabitants on an area of 50.37 km^{2}, and Rorschach is its capital.

== Demographics ==
Rorschach Wahlkreis has a population of 43,928 (as of 31 December 2020). Of the foreign population, (as of 2000), 764 are from Germany, 2,057 are from Italy, 2,910 are from ex-Yugoslavia, 553 are from Austria, 677 are from Turkey, and 1,570 are from another country. Of the Swiss national languages (as of 2000), 33,615 speak German, 132 people speak French, 1,195 people speak Italian, and 52 people speak Romansh.

The age distribution, as of 2000, in Rorschach Wahlkreis is; 4,566 children or 11.9% of the population are between 0 and 9 years old and 4,854 teenagers or 12.6% are between 10 and 19. Of the adult population, 4,415 people or 11.5% of the population are between 20 and 29 years old. 6,228 people or 16.2% are between 30 and 39, 5,589 people or 14.6% are between 40 and 49, and 4,927 people or 12.8% are between 50 and 59. The senior population distribution is 3,531 people or 9.2% of the population are between 60 and 69 years old, 2,697 people or 7.0% are between 70 and 79, there are 1,368 people or 3.6% who are between 80 and 89, and there are 205 people or 0.5% who are between 90 and 99, and 2 people who are 100 or more.

In 2000 there were 5,628 persons (or 14.7% of the population) who were living alone in a private dwelling. There were 9,045 (or 23.6%) persons who were part of a couple (married or otherwise committed) without children, and 20,134 (or 52.5%) who were part of a couple with children. There were 2,018 (or 5.3%) people who lived in single parent home, while there are 229 persons who were adult children living with one or both parents, 191 persons who lived in a household made up of relatives, 277 who lived household made up of unrelated persons, and 860 who are either institutionalized or live in another type of collective housing.

Out of the total population in Rorschach Wahlkreis, as of 2000, the highest education level completed by 8,565 people (22.3% of the population) was Primary, while 14,783 (38.5%) have completed Secondary, 4,367 (11.4%) have attended a Tertiary school, and 1,548 (4.0%) are not in school. The remainder did not answer this question.

== Economy ==
As of October 2009 the average unemployment rate was 4.1%.

== Religion ==
From the 2000 census, 19,463 or 50.7% are Roman Catholic, while 10,700 or 27.9% belonged to the Swiss Reformed Church. Of the rest of the population, there are 25 individuals (or about 0.07% of the population) who belong to the Christian Catholic faith, there are 1,054 individuals (or about 2.75% of the population) who belong to the Orthodox Church, and there are 1,031 individuals (or about 2.69% of the population) who belong to another Christian church. There are 13 individuals (or about 0.03% of the population) who are Jewish, and 2,177 (or about 5.67% of the population) who are Islamic. There are 152 individuals (or about 0.40% of the population) who belong to another church (not listed on the census), 2,978 (or about 7.76% of the population) belong to no church, are agnostic or atheist, and 789 individuals (or about 2.06% of the population) did not answer the question.

== Municipalities ==
has a population of 43,928 (as of 31 December 2020).

Coat of arms	Municipality	Inhabitants (31 December 2020)	Area in km^{2}	SFOS number
Berg	Berg	866	3.74	3211
Goldach	Goldach	9,476	4.68	3213
Mörschwil	Mörschwil	3,676	9.83	3214
Rorschach	Rorschach	9,646	1.78	3215
Rorschacherberg	Rorschacherberg	7,465	7.11	3216
Steinach	Steinach	3,549	4.52	3217
Thal	Thal	6,722	9.58	3237
Tübach	Tübach	1,494	1.99	3218
Untereggen	Untereggen	1,034	7.14	3219
	Total (9)	43,928	50.37	1722

== See also ==
- Municipalities of the canton of St. Gallen
