= Kleiner Hahnberg Castle =

Castle in Berg, Switzerland

Coordinates: 47°29′41″N 9°24′57″E

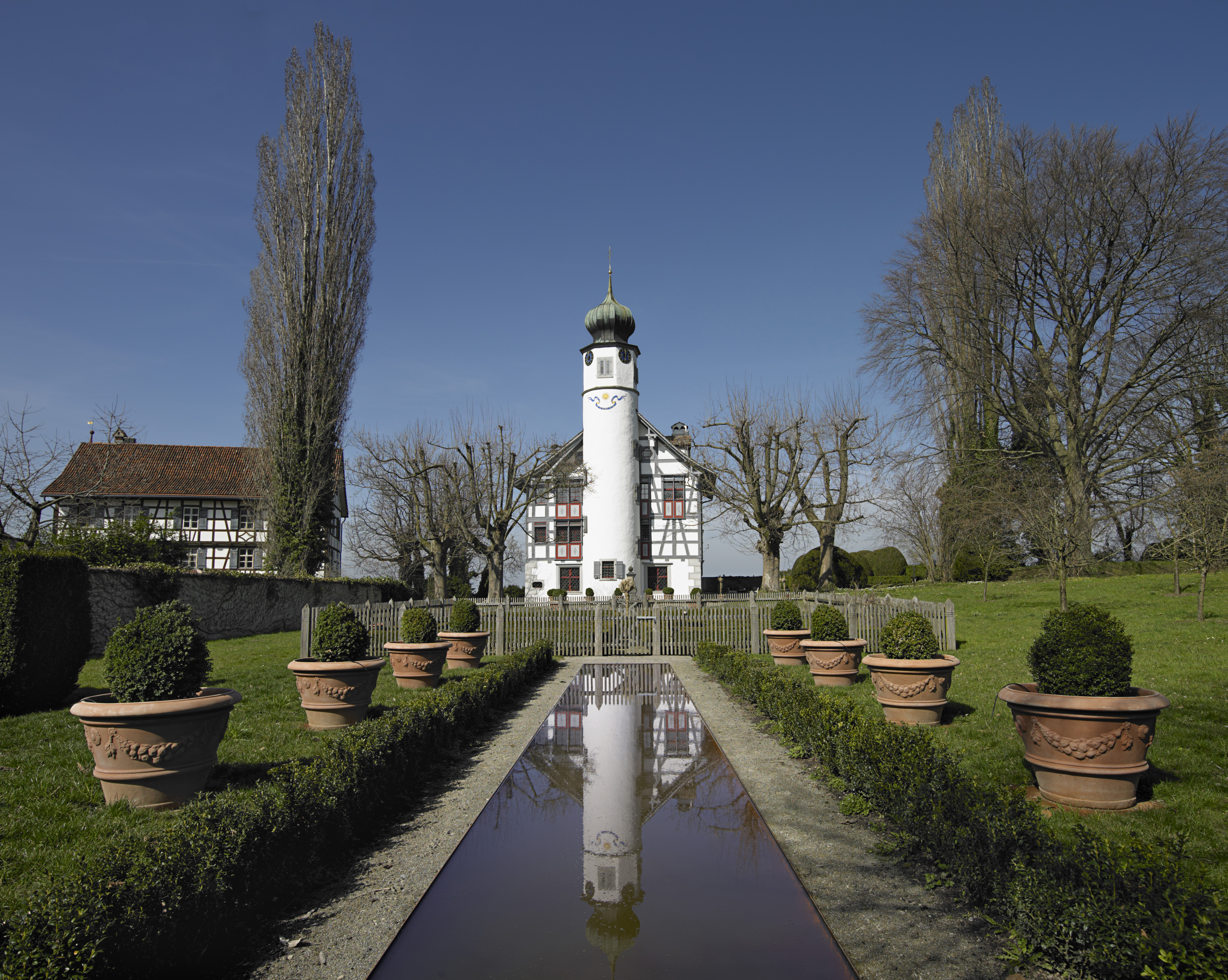

Kleiner Hahnberg Castle is a castle in the municipality of Berg of the Canton of St. Gallen in Switzerland. It is a Swiss heritage site of national significance.

== See also ==
- List of castles in Switzerland
