= Rheineck =

- Municipality
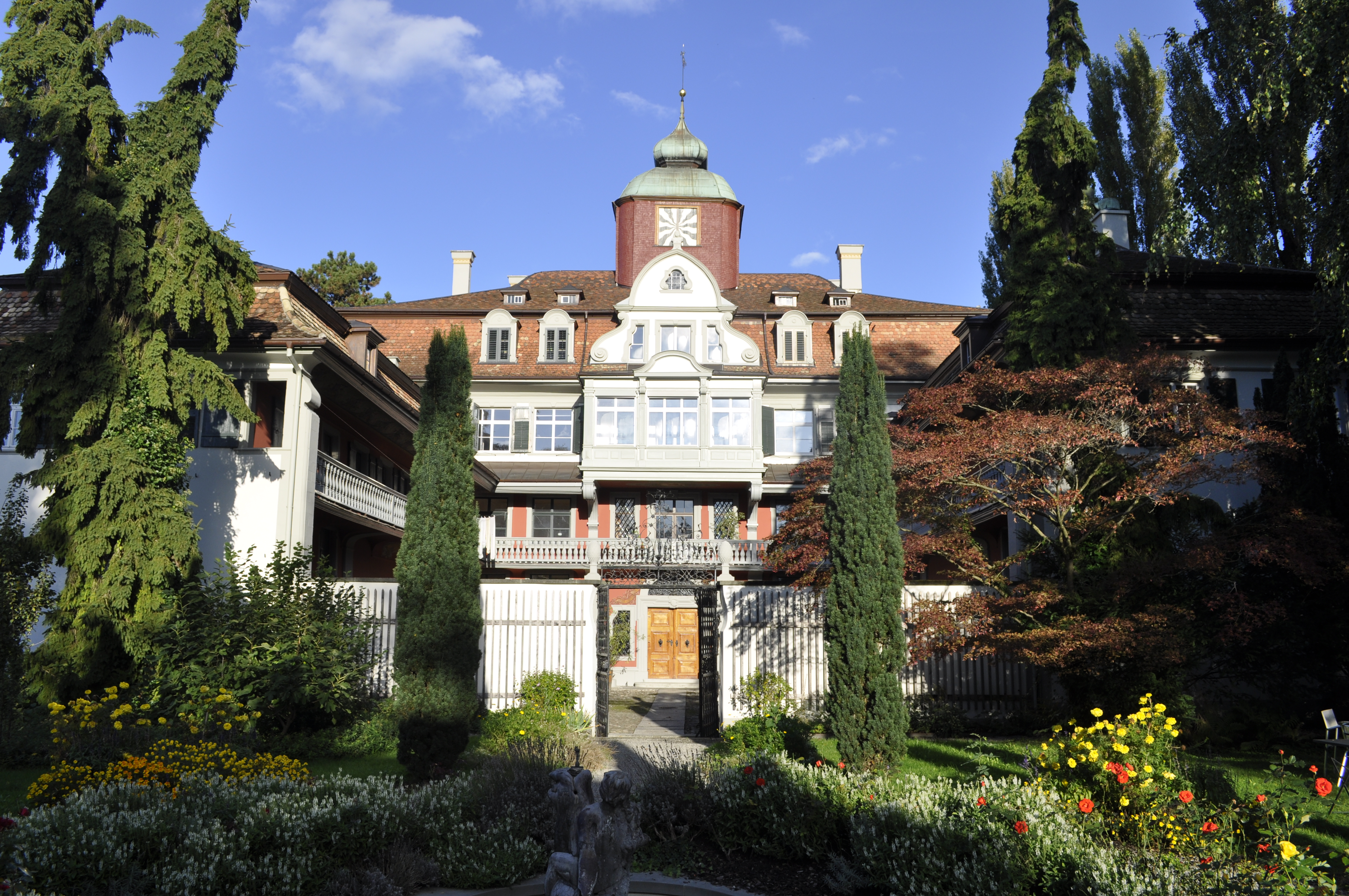

- Coat of arms
- Location of Rheineck
- Location within Switzerland Location within Canton of St. Gallen
- Coordinates: 47°28′N 9°35′E
- Country: Switzerland
- Canton: St. Gallen
- District: Rheintal

Government
  - Mayor: Urs Müller

Area
  - Total: 2.18 km^{2} (0.84 sq mi)
- Elevation: 400 m (1,300 ft)

Population (December 2020)
  - Total: 3,404
  - Density: 1,560/km^{2} (4,040/sq mi)
- Time zone: UTC+01:00 (CET)
  - Summer (DST): UTC+02:00 (CEST)
- Postal code: 9424
- SFOS number: 3235
- ISO 3166 code: CH-SG
- Surrounded by: Gaißau (AT-8), Lutzenberg (AR), Sankt Margrethen, Thal, Walzenhausen (AR)
- Website: rheineck.ch

Rheineck is a municipality in the Wahlkreis (constituency) of Rheintal in the canton of St. Gallen in Switzerland.

== History ==
Rheineck is first mentioned about 1163 as castellum Rinegge. In 1218 it was mentioned as Rinegg. An older reference from the Tabula Peutingeriana which mentioned Ad Rhenum is now considered to refer to St Margrethen.

== Geography ==
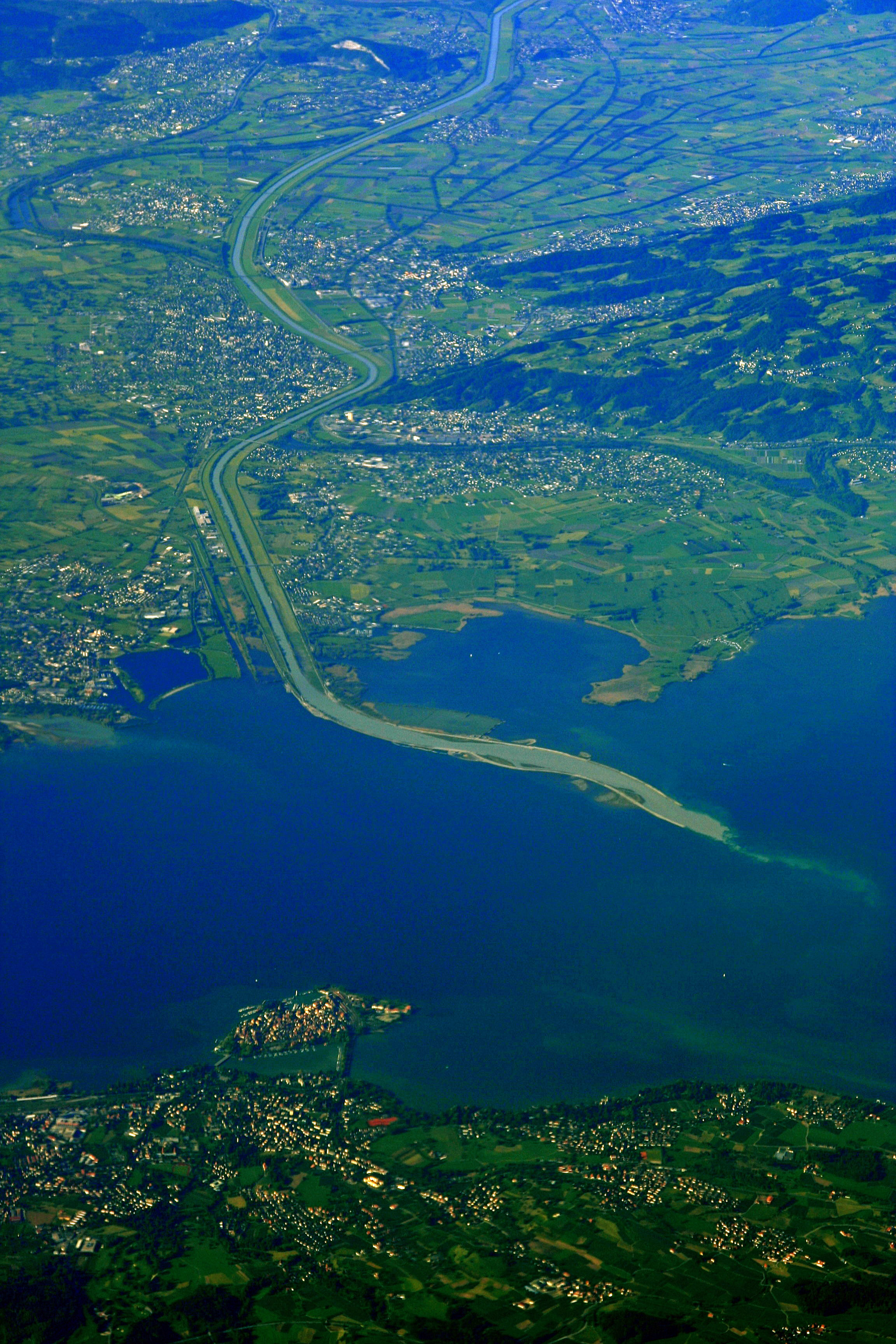
Mouth of the Rhine in Lake Constance

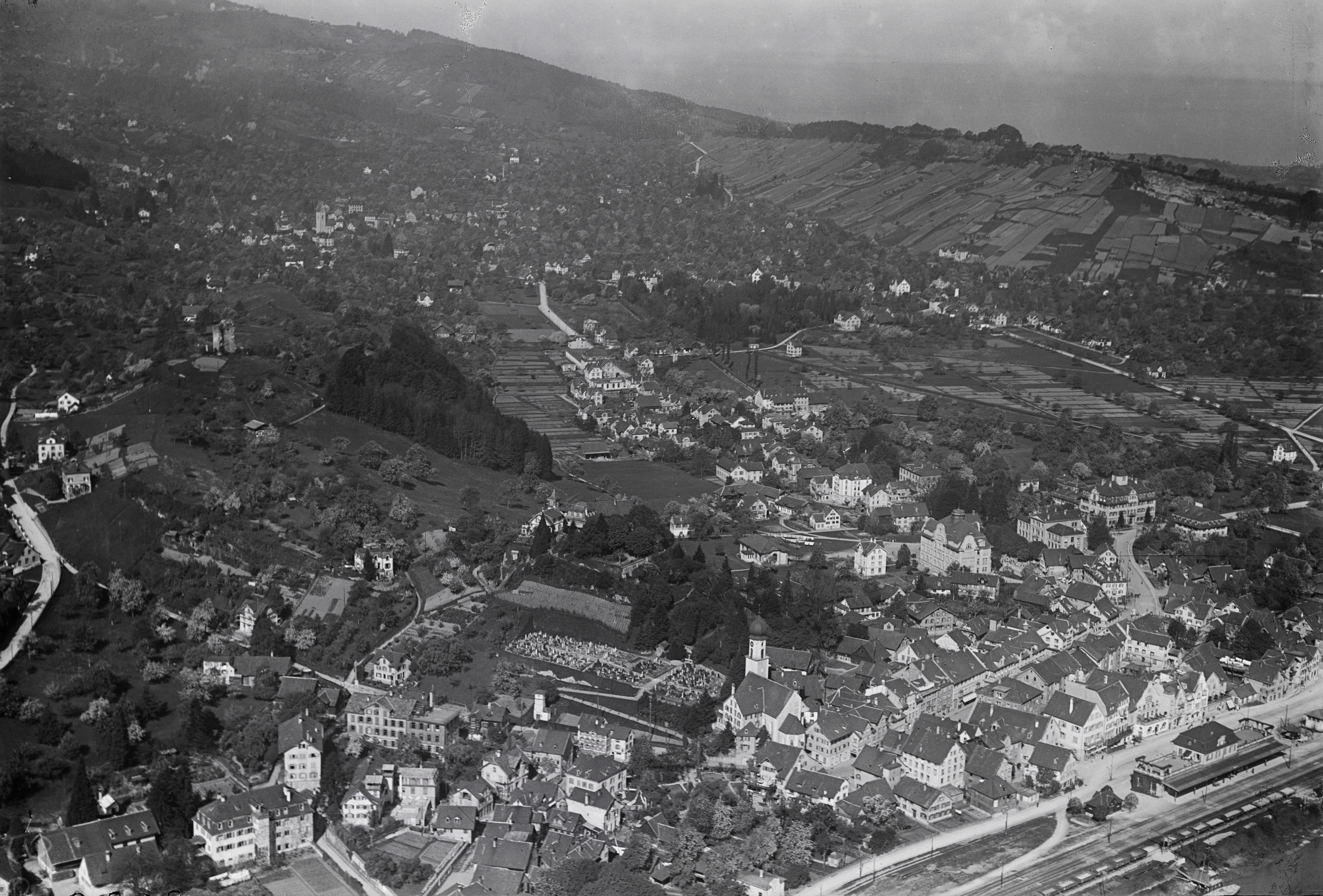
Aerial view from 400 m by Walter Mittelholzer (1923)

Rheineck has an area, as of 2006, of 2.2 km^{2} (0.85 sq mi). Of this area, 34.8% is used for agricultural purposes, while 7.7% is forested. Of the rest of the land, 51.1% is settled (buildings or roads) and the remainder (6.3%) is non-productive (rivers or lakes).

The municipality is located in the Rorschach region on the left bank of the Alter Rhein, an old channel of the Rhine, which is also the Austrian border. It is about 4 km (2.5 mi) south of Lake Constance. It is a regional center for the Appenzeller foothills and the lower Rhine valley. As it is located in the narrows between the hills and the Rhine, it has been strategically important for centuries.

== Coat of arms ==
The blazon of the municipal coat of arms is Gules three Fishes Azure nainaint in band on a Bend wavy Argent

== Demographics ==
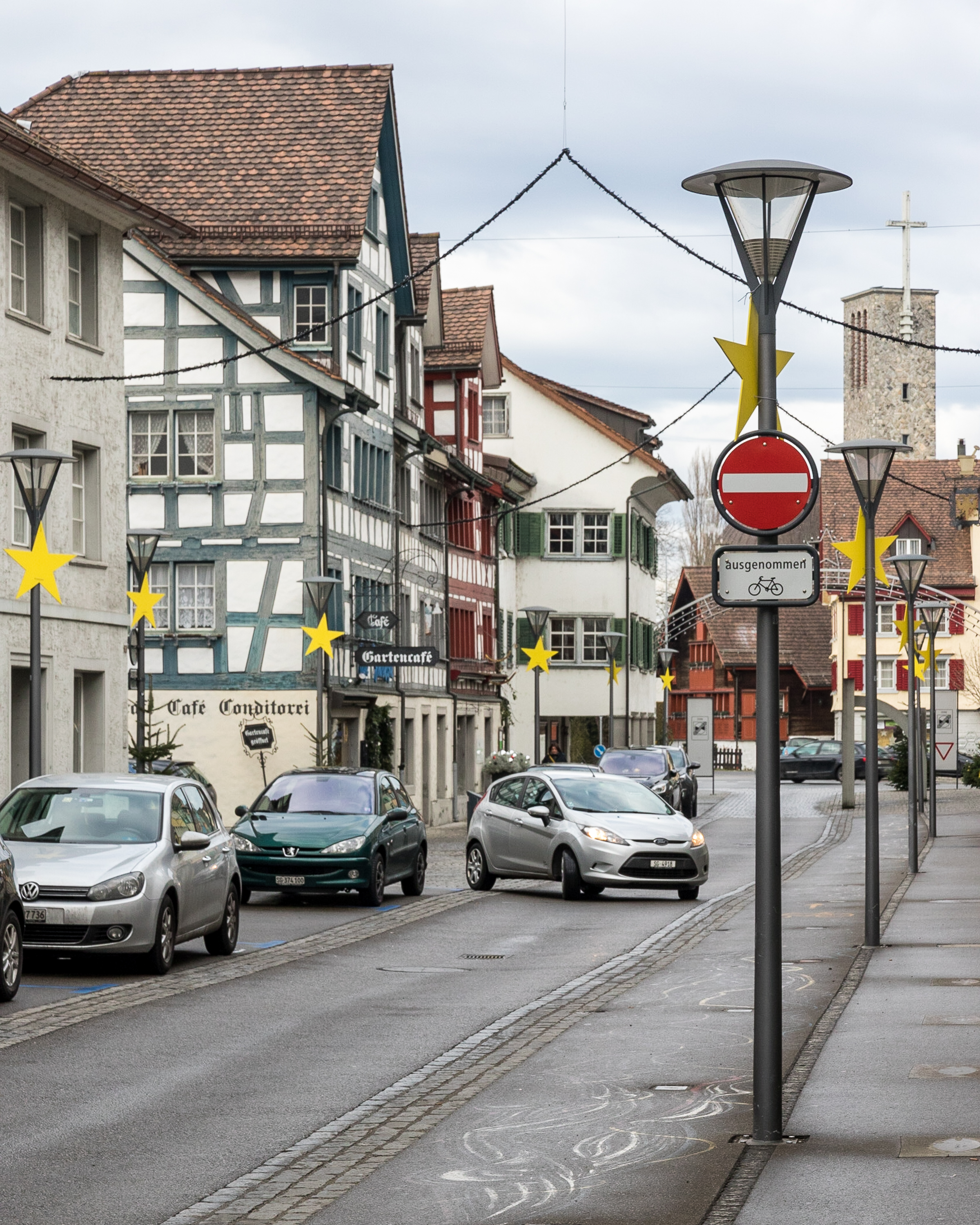
Hauptstrasse in Rheineck

Rheineck has a population (as of 31 December 2020) of 3,404. As of 2007, about 34.7% of the population was made up of foreign nationals. Of the foreign population, (as of 2000), 49 are from Germany, 318 are from Italy, 460 are from ex-Yugoslavia, 101 are from Austria, 42 are from Turkey, and 111 are from another country. Over the last 10 years the population has decreased at a rate of -1.6%. Most of the population (as of 2000) speaks German (82.2%), with Italian being second most common ( 6.1%) and Serbo-Croatian being third ( 4.1%). Of the Swiss national languages (as of 2000), 2,655 speak German, 7 people speak French, 196 people speak Italian, and 7 people speak Romansh.

The age distribution, as of 2000, in Rheineck is; 389 children or 12.0% of the population are between 0 and 9 years old and 405 teenagers or 12.5% are between 10 and 19. Of the adult population, 383 people or 11.9% of the population are between 20 and 29 years old. 492 people or 15.2% are between 30 and 39, 463 people or 14.3% are between 40 and 49, and 409 people or 12.7% are between 50 and 59. The senior population distribution is 316 people or 9.8% of the population are between 60 and 69 years old, 225 people or 7.0% are between 70 and 79, there are 123 people or 3.8% who are between 80 and 89, and there are 26 people or 0.8% who are between 90 and 99.

In 2000 there were 493 persons (or 15.3% of the population) who were living alone in a private dwelling. There were 756 (or 23.4%) persons who were part of a couple (married or otherwise committed) without children, and 1,691 (or 52.3%) who were part of a couple with children. There were 170 (or 5.3%) people who lived in single parent home, while there are 16 persons who were adult children living with one or both parents, 9 persons who lived in a household made up of relatives, 11 who lived household made up of unrelated persons, and 85 who are either institutionalized or live in another type of collective housing.

In the 2007 federal election the most popular party was the SVP which received 41.1% of the vote. The next three most popular parties were the CVP (17.1%), the FDP (15.3%) and the SP (13.7%).

In Rheineck about 62.2% of the population (between age 25–64) have completed either non-mandatory upper secondary education or additional higher education (either university or a Fachhochschule). Out of the total population in Rheineck, as of 2000, the highest education level completed by 813 people (25.2% of the population) was Primary, while 1,171 (36.2%) have completed their secondary education, 267 (8.3%) have attended a Tertiary school, and 167 (5.2%) are not in school. The remainder did not answer this question.

The historical population is given in the following table:

year	population
1634	548
1850	1,177
1900	2,094
1950	2,600
1970	3,275
1990	3,101
2000	3,231

== Heritage sites of national significance ==
The Löwenhof at Rorschacherstrasse 15 is listed as a Swiss heritage site of national significance.

The village of Rheineck is designated as part of the Inventory of Swiss Heritage Sites. Additionally, the Schlosslandschaft Rorschach / Alter Rhein, a number of castles in a region along the Rhine river, is also a designated as part of the inventory. The Schlosslandschaft is shared between Berg, Goldach, Mörschwil, Rheineck, Rorschacherberg, St. Margrethen, Steinach, Thal and Tübach.

== Economy ==
As of 2007, Rheineck had an unemployment rate of 2.87%. As of 2005, there were 9 people employed in the primary economic sector and about 4 businesses involved in this sector. 591 people are employed in the secondary sector and there are 58 businesses in this sector. 805 people are employed in the tertiary sector, with 144 businesses in this sector.

As of October 2009 the average unemployment rate was 4.6%. There were 203 businesses in the municipality of which 54 were involved in the secondary sector of the economy while 147 were involved in the third.

As of 2000 there were 606 residents who worked in the municipality, while 1,038 residents worked outside Rheineck and 1,080 people commuted into the municipality for work.

== Transport ==
Rheineck railway station is situated on the St. Margrethen–Rorschach railway line, which is served by St. Gallen S-Bahn services S2, S4 and S5 providing several trains per hour to the city of St. Gallen. Additionally, the Rheineck–Walzenhausen mountain railway links the station to Walzenhausen, 272 m (892 ft) above Rheineck, once or twice an hour. It is also connected to the lines 222 and 242 of the postal bus service and the lines 304 and 305 of Rheintal Bus (RTB).

Rheineck is the easterly end of the Swiss shipping services (Schweizerische Bodensee-Schifffahrt) on Lake Constance, and the town's landing stages are located behind the railway station on the Alter Rhein channel.

== Religion ==
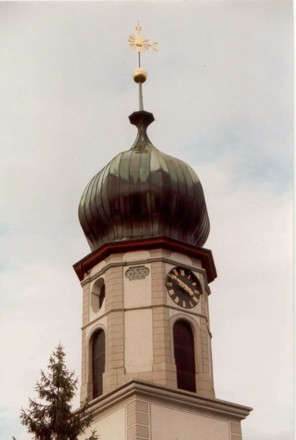
Church tower of the Swiss Reformed Church in Rheineck

From the 2000 census, 1,421 or 44.0% are Roman Catholic, while 982 or 30.4% belonged to the Swiss Reformed Church. Of the rest of the population, there are 88 individuals (or about 2.72% of the population) who belong to the Orthodox Church, and there are 105 individuals (or about 3.25% of the population) who belong to another Christian church. There are 340 (or about 10.52% of the population) who are Islamic. There are 28 individuals (or about 0.87% of the population) who belong to another church (not listed on the census), 187 (or about 5.79% of the population) belong to no church, are agnostic or atheist, and 80 individuals (or about 2.48% of the population) did not answer the question.

== Notable people ==
- Johann Rudolf Tschiffeli (1716–1780) a Swiss agronomist, a wealthy merchant, economist and lawyer; spent much of his youth in Rheineck
- Anna Indermaur (1894–1980), Swiss artist; born in Rheineck
- Karl Eckstein (born 1949) professor, Doctor of Law, lawyer, honorary Consul of the Russian Federation in Switzerland; went to school in Rheineck.
- Ruth Erat (born 1951) a Swiss teacher, author, painter and politician; lives in Rheineck.
