= Karl Eckstein (lawyer) =

German lawyer (born 1949)

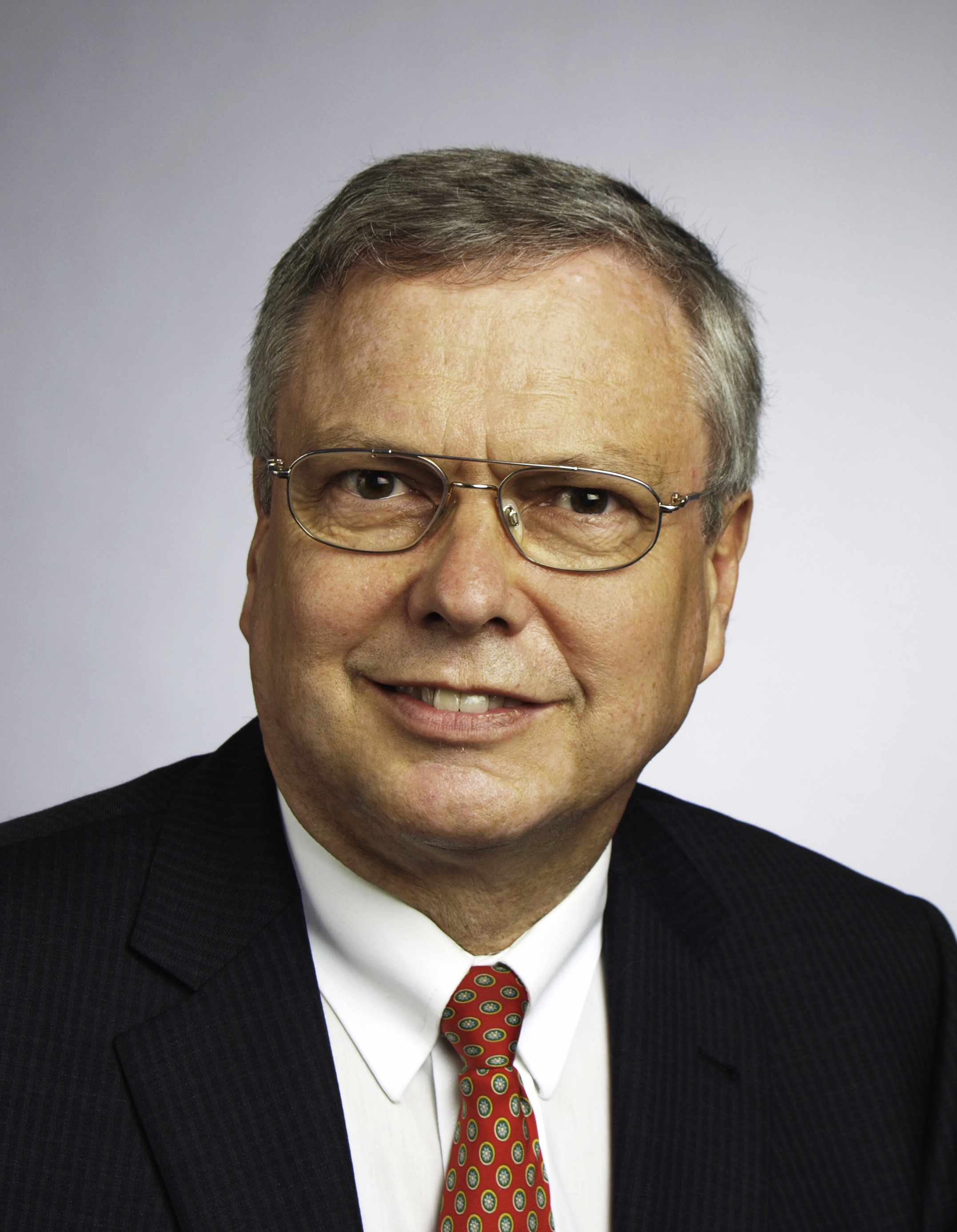
- Born: April 16, 1949 (age 76); Wahlwies, Germany
- Citizenship: Swiss, Russian
- Occupations: Director of "Eckstein & Partner", attorney of law, honorary Consul of the Russian Federation in Switzerland
- Children: Alexander, Alina
- Website: www.eckstein.ru www.echr.ch

Karl Eckstein (born 16 April 1949, Wahlwies, Germany) – professor, Doctor of Law, lawyer, honorary Consul of the Russian Federation in Switzerland.

== Youth and Student years ==
Karl Eckstein was born on the 16th of April in Wahlwies, Germany (FRG). In 1965 he finished secondary school in Rheineck, St. Gallen (Switzerland) and entered the Teacher-training institute in Rorschach, St. Gallen, which he graduated in 1969 to become a certified teacher. Thereafter in 1971–1975 he pursued his studies at the faculty of law in the University of Basel (Switzerland).

== Teaching and academic career ==
From 1969 until 1971, Eckstein worked as an elementary grade schoolteacher in Dicken, St. Gallen. Subsequently, in 1975 he received a degree in Law at the University of Basel, where he successfully defended his doctoral thesis in 1979 and acquired the certificate of Doctor of Law. The qualification of Swiss lawyer was given to him by the Supreme Court of Basel in 1980. Since 1995 until now Eckstein has worked in the Moscow State Institute of International Relations (MGIMO-University) as a professor of constitutional and administrative law. In 2001 he received a professor’s certificate according to the decision of the attestation commission in Moscow.

== Professional activity ==
While writing the doctoral thesis, Eckstein worked in the legal department of the St. Gallen Ministry of Education (1976–1977). After having received the certificate of Doctor of Law, he began working in the legal department of the federal energy department in Bern and was responsible for matters of international law concerning the use of the atomic energy and admission for the construction of a nuclear power plant in Leibstadt.

Since 1982, Eckstein has provided support and advice of western business owners in their activities in Russia and former republics of the USSR. Even during the Cold War, Doctor of Law, Professor Eckstein was at the head of Moscow office of the largest Swiss industrial consortium, where he represented the interests of such Swiss enterprises as Nestle, Sulzer, SIG, Bührle Oerlikon, Andre Lausanne, Bühler Uzwil etc.

At dawn of the Perestroika in 1986 when there was a prospect of access to the large soviet market, Professor Eckstein founded his own consulting company “Eckstein & Partner” primarily responsible for legal and accounting services, as well as trust management. In 2000 the firm’s practice expanded to include the protection of business interests in the European Court of Human Rights and representation of clients' interests at Interpol, hence specialising in providing legal advice to lawyers and companies by using the European Convention to protect their rights and interests, by either assisting them in successfully using the Court’s case law before national authorities, or by helping them lodge an application with the Court. Eckstein's legal practice covers a wide range of violations of companies' Convention rights, such as violations taking place in the framework of criminal investigations, corporate raiding, failure of the state to protect against interferences by third parties, searches and seizures, asset freezing orders, tax disputes, shareholders disputes, licenses and permits procedures, expropriations, bankruptcy proceedings, and investment protection.

During 1992–1993, Eckstein gave legal advice to the commission on issues of school reform in the Parliament of the Russian Federation.

Through 1992–1994, he was the counsellor of the government of Tajikistan and managed the project "Economic reform of Tajikistan" on the instructions of the government (together with St.Gallen University professors Franz Eger and Bernd Ships).

In 2000, together with R.Shafhauser and S.Vershinin, he issued the book "How to arrange relations between a citizen and an official?". Eckstein was one of the first who suggested creating a single code of administrative-procedural rules at the federal level given the present regulation of administrative procedures in Russia as being fragmentary, although the significance of a single regulation in this sphere was recognized indisputable in many democratic legal states long ago. Such as principles that regulate the administrative procedures in Switzerland as the country with firm democratic traditions are presented and commented in the book.

In 2007, Eckstein became the first honorary Consul of the Russian Federation in Switzerland. On 5 June 2007 in Zürich the official opening of the Honorary Consulate of the Russian Federation. More than 300 people took part in the opening ceremony. Among them there were ex- ambassador of the Russian Federation in Switzerland Dmitry Cherkashin, the mayor of Zurich, Elmar Ledergerber and representatives of the local authorities, the business community, politicians and cultural figures. As the main goals Karl Eckstein as the Honorary consul of the Russian Federation sees the development and strengthening of business, economic and cultural relations between Russia and Switzerland. Office in Zurich should become a starting point, first of all, for businesspeople, Swiss and Russian, who wish to establish good bilateral relations and business in Russia and Switzerland.

== Publications ==
- 2007 - Geschäftserfolg in Russland Orell Füssli Verlag, Zürich 2007
- 2007 - A right to be left in peace Karl Eckstein / Mjriana Visentin in Human Rights, Democracy and the Rule of Law: Liber amicorum Luzius Wildhaber, Basel 2007
- 2005 - Doktrin des öffentlichen Rechts in Russland in: Wirtschaftsrecht zu Beginn des 21. Jahrhunderts, Festschrift für Peter Nobel zum 60. Geburtstag, Stämpfli Verlag Bern, 2005, S. 893-908
- 2005 - Business mit Russland Verlag Paul Haupt, mit einem Vorwort von Nationalrat Ernst Muehlemann, Hauptreferent des Europarates für die Aufnahme Russlands
- 2003 - Markteintritt: Reibungsloser Einstieg Der Wirtschaftswegweiser für den Mittelstand "So kommen Sie nach Russland", Primeverlag 2003 (S. 194 - 198)
- 2002 - Fundamental rights and freedoms: according to Russian Constitution and European Convention on Human Rights and Fundamental Freedoms Moscow, Nota Bene publishing house, the foreword of the European Court of human rights president in Strasbourg, prof. Dr. Luzius Wildhaber, Moscow (in Russian)
- 2001 - Commentary on the draft law "On administrative procedures" Moscow, Publishers Progress Complex (in Russian)
- 2000 - How to arrange relations between a citizen and an official? Administrative procedures on the example of Switzerland laws Moscow, Publishers EKON (in Russian)
- 2000 - Commentary on the second chapter of Russian Constitution Moscow State Institute of International Relations (MGIMO), issue 2, Moscow, Publishers EKON (in Russian)
