= Thal, St. Gallen =

Thal
- Municipality
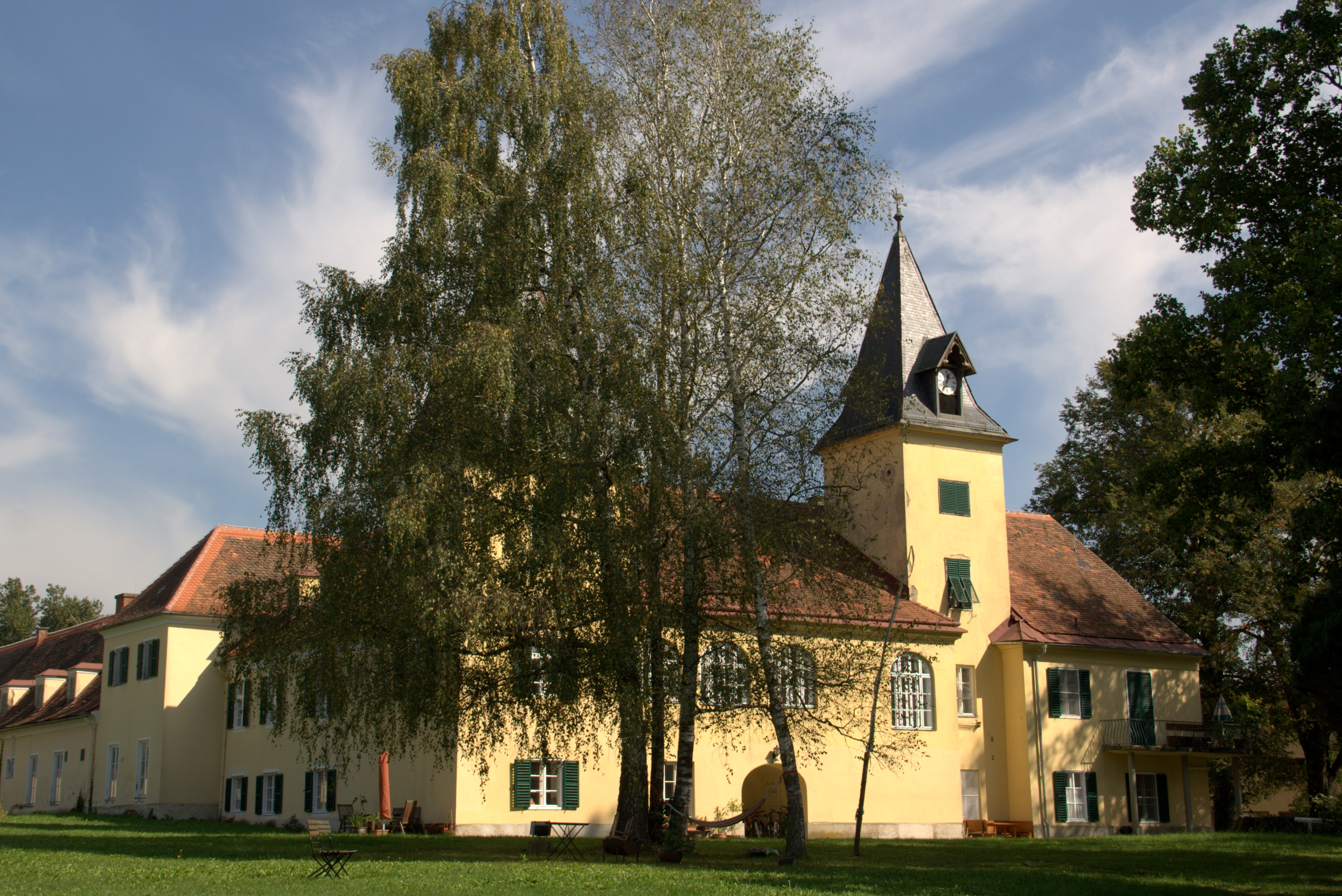

- Coat of arms
- Location of Thal
- Location within Switzerland Location within Canton of St. Gallen
- Coordinates: 47°28′N 9°34′E
- Country: Switzerland
- Canton: St. Gallen
- District: Wahlkreis Rorschach

Government
  - Mayor: Robert Raths

Area
  - Total: 9.58 km^{2} (3.70 sq mi)
- Elevation: 415 m (1,362 ft)

Population (December 2020)
  - Total: 6,722
  - Density: 702/km^{2} (1,820/sq mi)
- Time zone: UTC+01:00 (CET)
  - Summer (DST): UTC+02:00 (CEST)
- Postal code: 9425
- SFOS number: 3237
- ISO 3166 code: CH-SG
- Surrounded by: Fußach (AT-8), Gaißau (AT-8), Heiden (AR), Höchst (AT-8), Horn (TG), Lutzenberg (AR), Nonnenhorn (DE-BY), Rheineck, Rorschacherberg, Wasserburg (Bodensee) (DE-BY), Wolfhalden (AR)
- Website: thal.ch

Thal (German pronunciation: [ˈtaːl]) is a village and municipality in the Wahlkreis (constituency) of Rorschach in the canton of St. Gallen in Switzerland. Besides the village of Thal itself, the municipality also includes the villages of Altenrhein, Buechen, Buriet and Staad.

== History ==
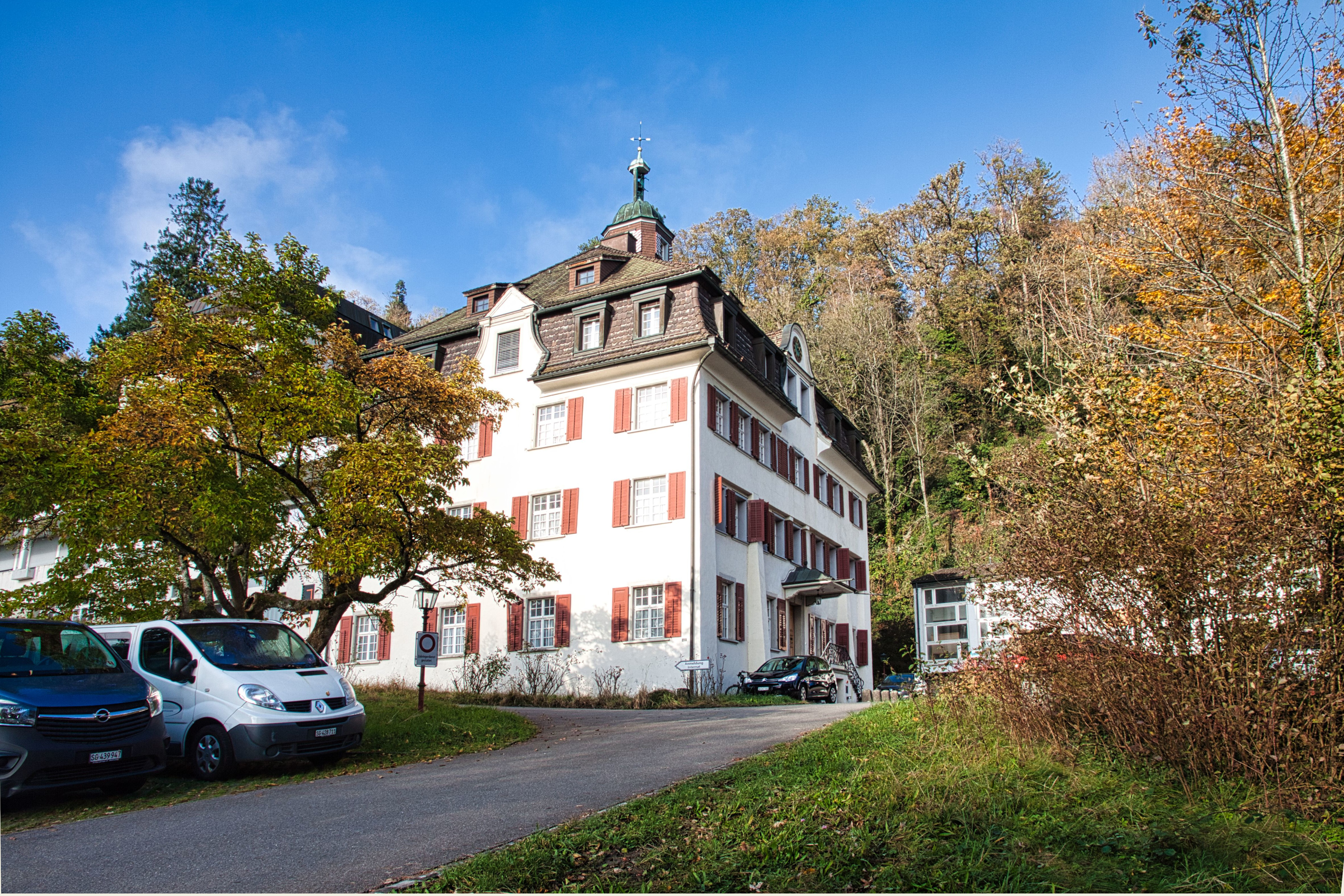
Marienburg in Thal

Thal is first mentioned in 1163 as curtis tale.

The Weinburg was of regional importance as the seat of noble dynasties (1419–1686), of federal importance as a county recorder's office (1686–1772) and of European importance as the seat of the Prince of Hohenzollern-Sigmaringen (1817–1929). After the First World War, the House of Hohenzollern-Sigmaringen was impoverished and Prince Friedrich von Hohenzollern (1891–1965) was forced to sell the Weinburg estate. The Steyler Mission Society (Societas Verbi Divini, SVD) was found as the buyer. On 2 December 1929, the contract of sale was concluded. One year later, the Weinburg could be opened under the new name Gymnasium Marienburg, first as a mission school. The secondary school was followed by a theological seminary and finally a high school. In the summer of 2012, the high school closed its doors.

The 1983 UCI Road World Championships (cycling) took place in Altenrhein, a village in the municipality.

== Geography ==
Thal has an area, as of 2006, of 9.6 km^{2} (3.7 sq mi). Of this area, 44% is used for agricultural purposes, while 13.1% is forested. Of the rest of the land, 35.8% is settled (buildings or roads) and the remainder (7.2%) is non-productive (rivers or lakes).

The municipality was part of the Unterrheintal District, but in 2004 became part of the Rorschach Wahlkreis. It is located between the Appenzell foothills, the Buchberg and Lake Constance. It consists of the haufendorf village (an irregular, unplanned and quite closely packed village, built around a central square) of Thal and (since 1803) the villages of Altenrhein, Buechen, Buriet, Staad and a number of scattered hamlets.

In the North and East, the municipality borders the old bed of the Rhine river (Alter Rhein) and Austria.

Aerial view from 200 m by Walter Mittelholzer (1923)

== Coat of arms ==
The blazon of the municipal coat of arms is Argent a Grape Azure slipped embowed and leaved Vert.

== Demographics ==
Thal has a population (as of 31 December 2020) of 6,722. As of 2007, about 18.9% of the population was made up of foreign nationals. Of the foreign population, (as of 2000), 112 are from Germany, 188 are from Italy, 417 are from ex-Yugoslavia, 93 are from Austria, 42 are from Turkey, and 181 are from another country. Over the last 10 years the population has grown at a rate of 5.5%. Most of the population (as of 2000) speaks German (91.3%), with Albanian being second most common ( 2.0%) and Italian being third ( 1.8%). Of the Swiss national languages (as of 2000), 5,475 speak German, 23 people speak French, 110 people speak Italian, and 9 people speak Romansh.

The age distribution, as of 2000, in Thal is; 803 children or 13.4% of the population are between 0 and 9 years old and 798 teenagers or 13.3% are between 10 and 19. Of the adult population, 682 people or 11.4% of the population are between 20 and 29 years old. 986 people or 16.4% are between 30 and 39, 906 people or 15.1% are between 40 and 49, and 734 people or 12.2% are between 50 and 59. The senior population distribution is 524 people or 8.7% of the population are between 60 and 69 years old, 315 people or 5.3% are between 70 and 79, there are 210 people or 3.5% who are between 80 and 89, and there are 37 people or 0.6% who are between 90 and 99, and 1 person who is 100 or more.

In 2000 there were 707 persons (or 11.8% of the population) who were living alone in a private dwelling. There were 1,350 (or 22.5%) persons who were part of a couple (married or otherwise committed) without children, and 3,345 (or 55.8%) who were part of a couple with children. There were 319 (or 5.3%) people who lived in single parent home, while there are 30 persons who were adult children living with one or both parents, 12 persons who lived in a household made up of relatives, 29 who lived household made up of unrelated persons, and 204 who are either institutionalized or live in another type of collective housing.

In the 2007 federal election the most popular party was the SVP which received 41.4% of the vote. The next three most popular parties were the CVP (16.1%), the SP (14.2%) and the FDP (12.1%).

In Thal about 72.9% of the population (between age 25–64) have completed either non-mandatory upper secondary education or additional higher education (either university or a Fachhochschule). Out of the total population in Thal, as of 2000, the highest education level completed by 1,150 people (19.2% of the population) was Primary, while 2,324 (38.8%) have completed their secondary education, 663 (11.1%) have attended a Tertiary school, and 220 (3.7%) are not in school. The remainder did not answer this question.

The historical population is given in the following table:

year	population
1850	2,748
1900	3,546
1910	3,888
1930	3,625
1950	4,025
1970	4,919
1990	5,399

== Transportation ==
Staad railway station, Wartensee railway station and Altenrhein airport are located in the municipality.

Stadler Rail has a factory at Altenrhein, which constructs railway rolling stock for Switzerland and other countries. Orders have including new trains in 2019-2021 for the Glasgow Subway in Scotland and the Class 777 in England.

== Economy ==
As of 2007, Thal had an unemployment rate of 2.27%. As of 2005, there were 95 people employed in the primary economic sector and about 31 businesses involved in this sector. 1,717 people are employed in the secondary sector and there are 101 businesses in this sector. 1,327 people are employed in the tertiary sector, with 226 businesses in this sector.

As of October 2009 the average unemployment rate was 4.9%. There were 371 businesses in the municipality of which 98 were involved in the secondary sector of the economy while 246 were involved in the third.

As of 2000 there were 1,139 residents who worked in the municipality, while 2,004 residents worked outside Thal and 2,074 people commuted into the municipality for work.

== Religion ==
From the 2000 census, 2,539 or 42.3% are Roman Catholic, while 2,221 or 37.0% belonged to the Swiss Reformed Church. Of the rest of the population, there is 1 individual who belongs to the Christian Catholic faith, there are 106 individuals (or about 1.77% of the population) who belong to the Orthodox Church, and there are 190 individuals (or about 3.17% of the population) who belong to another Christian church. There are 4 individuals (or about 0.07% of the population) who are Jewish, and 296 (or about 4.94% of the population) who are Islamic. There are 21 individuals (or about 0.35% of the population) who belong to another church (not listed on the census), 455 (or about 7.59% of the population) belong to no church, are agnostic or atheist, and 163 individuals (or about 2.72% of the population) did not answer the question.

== Sights ==
The Schlosslandschaft Rorschach / Alter Rhein, a number of castles in a region along the Rhine river, is designated as part of the Inventory of Swiss Heritage Sites. The Schlosslandschaft is shared between Berg, Goldach, Mörschwil, Rheineck, Rorschacherberg, St. Margrethen, Steinach, Thal and Tübach.
