= St. Margrethen =

- Municipality
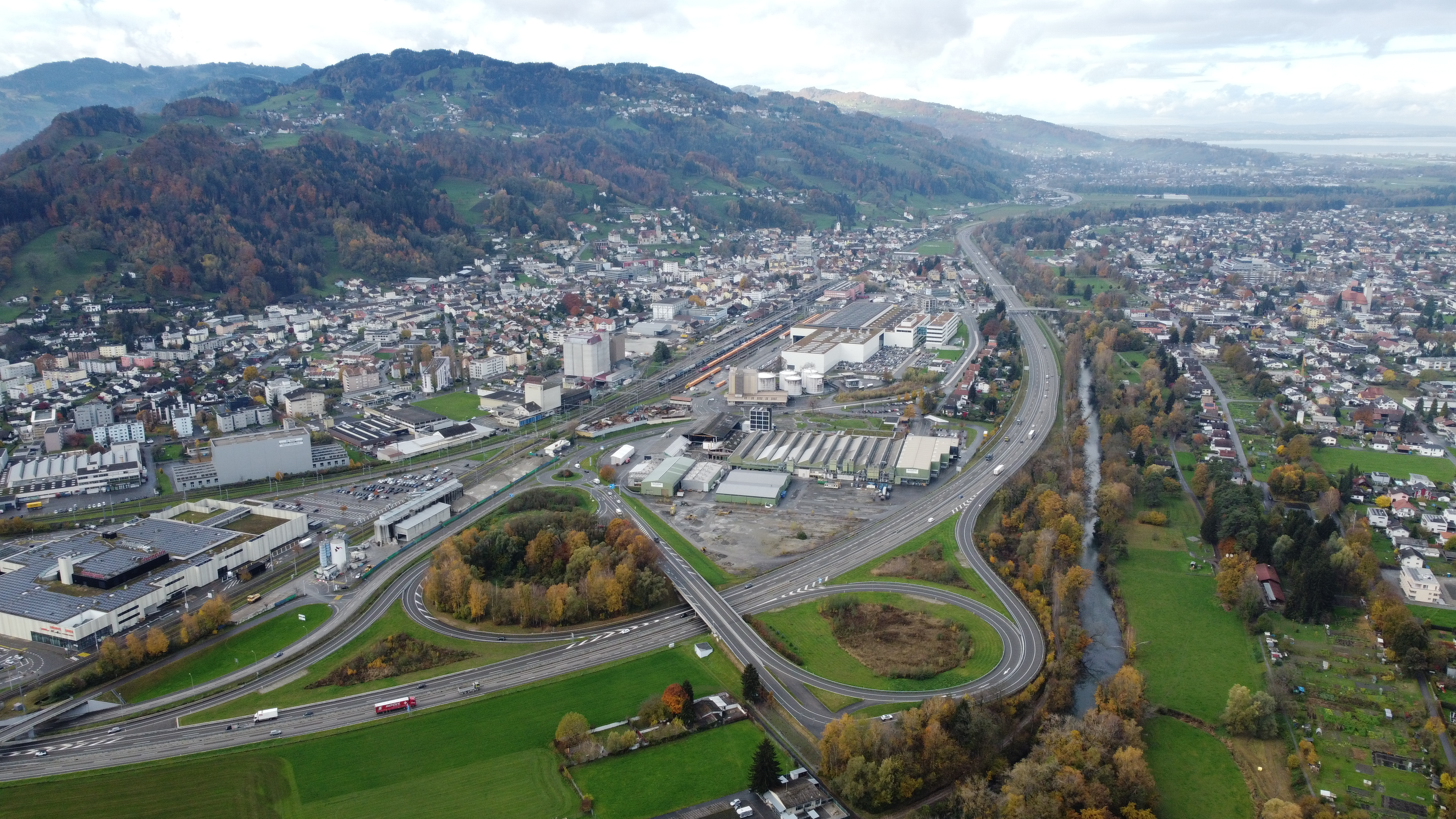
- St. Margrethen (left), Alter Rhein and Höchst (right)

- Flag Coat of arms
- Location of St. Margrethen
- Location within Switzerland Location within Canton of St. Gallen
- Coordinates: 47°27′N 9°38′E
- Country: Switzerland
- Canton: St. Gallen
- District: Wahlkreis Rheintal

Government
  - Mayor: Reto Friedauer

Area
  - Total: 6.85 km^{2} (2.64 sq mi)
- Elevation: 402 m (1,319 ft)

Population (December 2020)
  - Total: 5,991
  - Density: 875/km^{2} (2,270/sq mi)
- Time zone: UTC+01:00 (CET)
  - Summer (DST): UTC+02:00 (CEST)
- Postal code: 9430
- SFOS number: 3236
- ISO 3166 code: CH-SG
- Surrounded by: Au, Gaißau (AT-8), Höchst (AT-8), Lustenau (AT-8), Lutzenberg (AR), Rheineck, Walzenhausen (AR)
- Website: stmargrethen.ch (in German)

St. Margrethen (Sankt Margrethen, German pronunciation: [zaŋkt maʁˈɡʁeːtən], lit. 'Saint Margrethen') is a municipality in the Wahlkreis (constituency) of Rheintal in the canton of St. Gallen in Switzerland. It is located on the Swiss–Austrian border.

== Geography ==
Aerial view by Walter Mittelholzer (between 1918 and 1937)

St. Margrethen has an area, as of 2006, of 6.9 km^{2} (2.7 sq mi). Of this area, 28.3% is used for agricultural purposes, while 31.5% is forested. Of the rest of the land, 34.8% is settled (buildings or roads) and the remainder (5.4%) is non-productive (rivers or lakes).

It is located west of the Alpine Rhine, south of the Alter Rhein (old Rhine), and close to Lake Constance (Bodensee). The municipality borders the Swiss canton of Appenzell Ausserrhoden to the south, and Austria to the north and east. It is also relatively close to the border with Germany. St. Margrethen acts as a border town with the Austrian state of Vorarlberg.

Ad Rhenum, a Roman settlement shown in the Tabula Peutingeriana, was probably located near present-day St. Margrethen. It was situated on a road along the southern coast of Lake Constance and left side of the Alpine Rhine Valley.

== Coat of arms ==
The blazon of the municipal coat of arms is Argent a Grape Azure slipped palewise and leaved Vert.

== Demographics ==
St. Margrethen has a population (as of 31 December 2020) of 5,991. As of 2007, about 43.2% of the population was made up of foreign nationals. Of the foreign population, (as of 2000), 83 are from Germany, 280 are from Italy, 1,028 are from ex-Yugoslavia, 235 are from Austria, 170 are from Turkey, and 197 are from another country. Over the last 10 years the population has grown at a rate of 0.5%. Most of the population (as of 2000) speaks German (81.2%), with Serbo-Croatian being second most common (5.7%) and Albanian being third (4.0%). Of the Swiss national languages (as of 2000), 4,289 speak German, 12 people speak French, 175 people speak Italian, and 12 people speak Romansh.

The age distribution, as of 2000, in St. Margrethen is; 612 children or 11.6% of the population are between 0 and 9 years old and 724 teenagers or 13.7% are between 10 and 19. Of the adult population, 661 people or 12.5% of the population are between 20 and 29 years old. 822 people or 15.6% are between 30 and 39, 737 people or 13.9% are between 40 and 49, and 660 people or 12.5% are between 50 and 59. The senior population distribution is 486 people or 9.2% of the population are between 60 and 69 years old, 357 people or 6.8% are between 70 and 79, there are 190 people or 3.6% who are between 80 and 89, and there are 36 people or 0.7% who are between 90 and 99.

In 2000 there were 754 persons (or 14.3% of the population) who were living alone in a private dwelling. There were 1,141 (or 21.6%) persons who were part of a couple (married or otherwise committed) without children, and 2,872 (or 54.3%) who were part of a couple with children. There were 326 (or 6.2%) people who lived in single parent home, while there are 32 persons who were adult children living with one or both parents, 14 persons who lived in a household made up of relatives, 37 who lived household made up of unrelated persons, and 109 who are either institutionalized or live in another type of collective housing.

In the 2007 federal election the most popular party was the SVP which received 44.9% of the vote. The next three most popular parties were the CVP (16.7%), the FDP (15.4%) and the SP (13.9%).

In St. Margrethen about 58.5% of the population (between age 25–64) have completed either non-mandatory upper secondary education or additional higher education (either university or a Fachhochschule). Out of the total population in St. Margrethen, as of 2000, the highest education level completed by 1,336 people (25.3% of the population) was Primary, while 1,822 (34.5%) have completed their secondary education, 354 (6.7%) have attended a Tertiary school, and 311 (5.9%) are not in school. The remainder did not answer this question.

== Economy ==
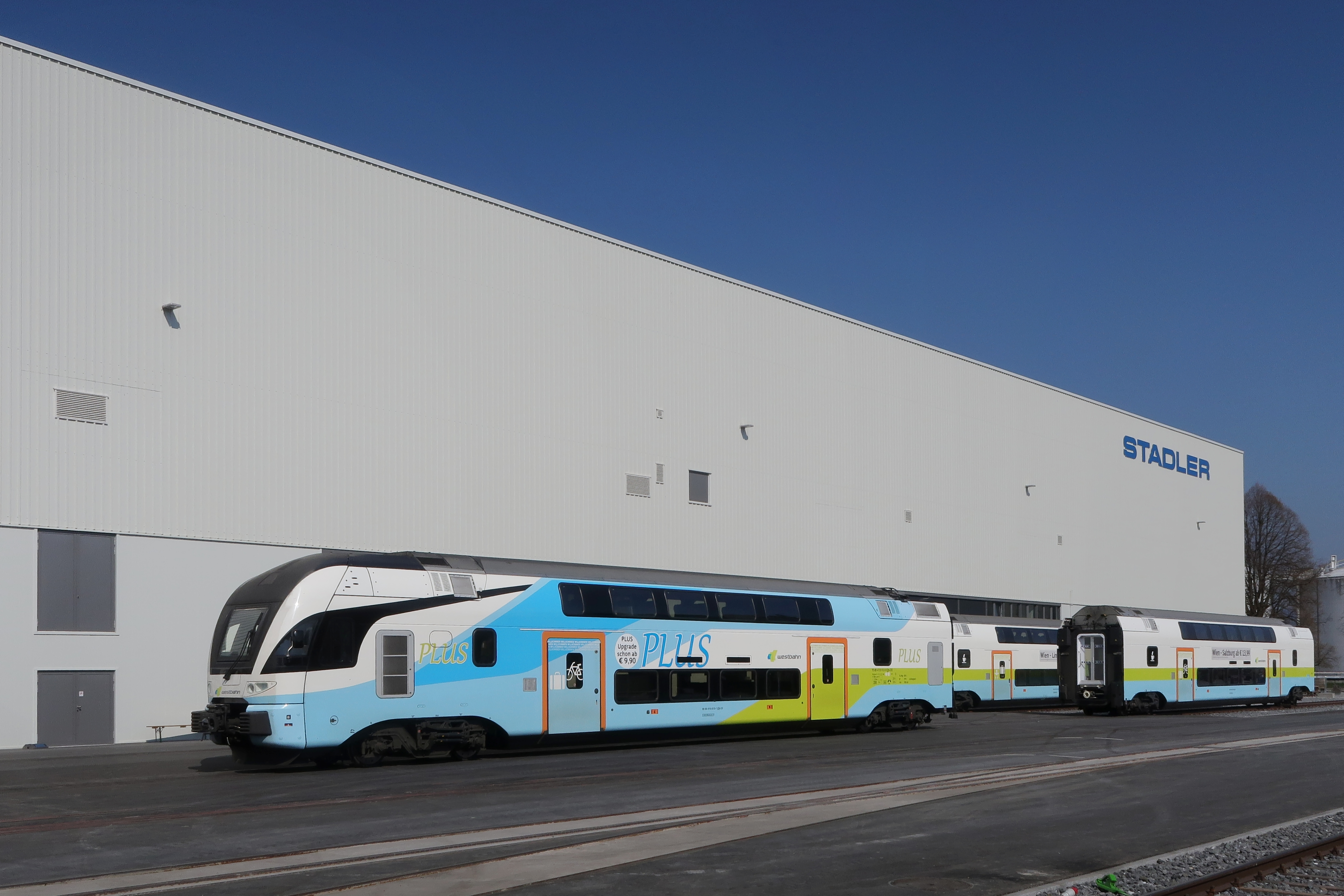
Stadler Rail AG

As of 2007, St. Margrethen had an unemployment rate of 2.79%. As of 2005, there were 71 people employed in the primary economic sector and about 17 businesses involved in this sector. 1,165 people are employed in the secondary sector and there are 66 businesses in this sector. 2,066 people are employed in the tertiary sector, with 273 businesses in this sector. As of October 2009 the average unemployment rate was 6.3%. There were 352 businesses in the municipality of which 73 were involved in the secondary sector of the economy while 263 were involved in the third. As of 2000 there were 1,365 residents who worked in the municipality, while 1,346 residents worked outside St. Margrethen and 2,161 people commuted into the municipality for work.

In 2019, the Stadler Rheintal AG opened next to St. Margrethen railway station.

== Transport ==
At St. Margrethen, the A1 motorway becomes the A13 motorway. Currently only a normal road links St. Margrethen with Höchst, Austria, which crosses the Alter Rhein. As a result, the town is at times clogged up with traffic before the customs posts. A motorway connector has long been projected, to link the pathways to Zurich and Munich.

St. Margrethen railway station is on the junction of the Chur–Rorschach railway line and St. Margrethen–Lauterach line to Austria (and towards Germany). The station is served by regional trains of St. Gallen S-Bahn and Vorarlberg S-Bahn, which are also part of the Bodensee S-Bahn. Long-distance trains (EuroCity, InterRegio) also call at the station, linking it, among others, with Bregenz (Austria), Chur, St. Gallen, München Hauptbahnhof (Germany) and Zürich HB.

The nearest airport is St. Gallen-Altenrhein Airport.

== Religion ==
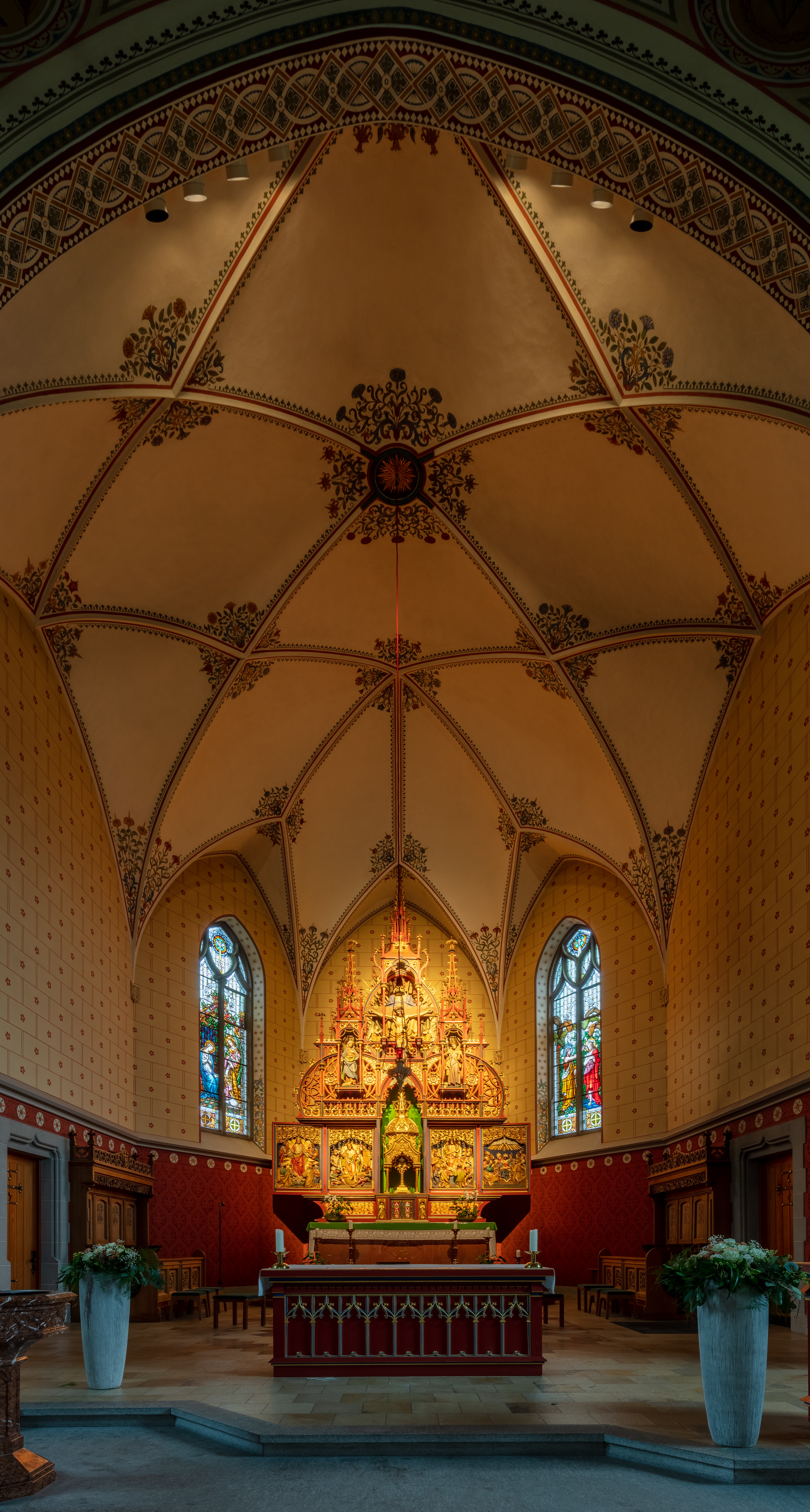
Catholic church St. Margrethen

From the 2000 census, 2,138 or 40.5% are Roman Catholic, while 1,406 or 26.6% belonged to the Swiss Reformed Church. Of the rest of the population, there are 4 individuals (or about 0.08% of the population) who belong to the Christian Catholic faith, there are 190 individuals (or about 3.60% of the population) who belong to the Orthodox Church, and there are 74 individuals (or about 1.40% of the population) who belong to another Christian church. There is 1 individual who is Jewish, and 881 (or about 16.67% of the population) who are Islamic. There are 75 individuals (or about 1.42% of the population) who belong to another church (not listed on the census), 332 (or about 6.28% of the population) belong to no church, are agnostic or atheist, and 184 individuals (or about 3.48% of the population) did not answer the question.

== Heritage sites of national significance ==
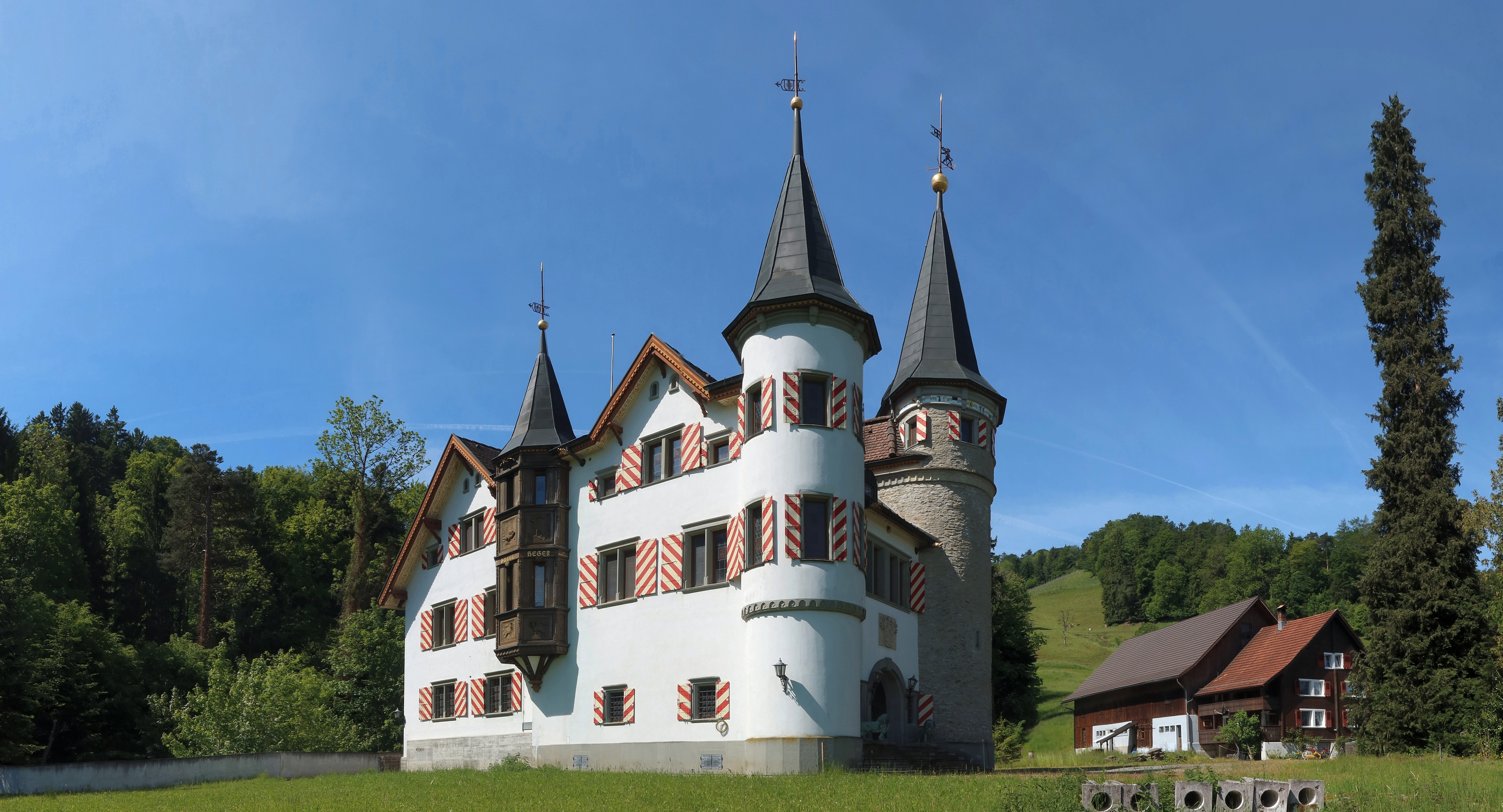
Vorburg Castle

The Old Church of St. Margaretha is listed as a Swiss heritage site of national significance. Additionally, the Schlosslandschaft Rorschach / Alter Rhein (lit. 'castle landscape Rorschach / Alter Rhein'), a number of castles in a region along the Rhine river, is designated as part of the Inventory of Swiss Heritage Sites. The Schlosslandschaft is shared between Berg, Goldach, Mörschwil, Rheineck, Rorschacherberg, St. Margrethen, Steinach, Thal and Tübach.

== People ==
- Roland Zöffel, born 17 August 1938, cyclist.
- Sepp Zellweger, born 19 September 1963, gymnast.

== See also ==
- Fort Heldsberg – Historical museum in St. Margrethen (Switzerland)
