= Villa Wartegg =

Historic mansion in Goldach, Switzerland

- Villa Hautle
- The villa in 2008
- Location: St. Gallerstrasse 98; Goldach, St. Gallen, Switzerland

History
- Built: 1903

Site notes
- Website: villawartegg.ch

Villa Wartegg, also known as Villa Hautle, is a historic mansion in Goldach, Switzerland. It was built for Franz Josef Hättenschwiler in 1903.

== History ==
The mansion was built in 1903 for Franz Josef Hättenschwiler, the owner of the Bruggmühle mill. Around 1907, his daughter and son-in-law, Josefina Sophie Hättenschwiler and Dr. Albert Hautle, took over the house. It remained in the family until 1999. It was later purchased and renovated by Irène Kellenberger.

The grounds include the villa, a garden, and washhouse. It is located at the corner of St. Gallerstrasse and Warteggweg in Goldach.
