= Mörschwil =

- Municipality
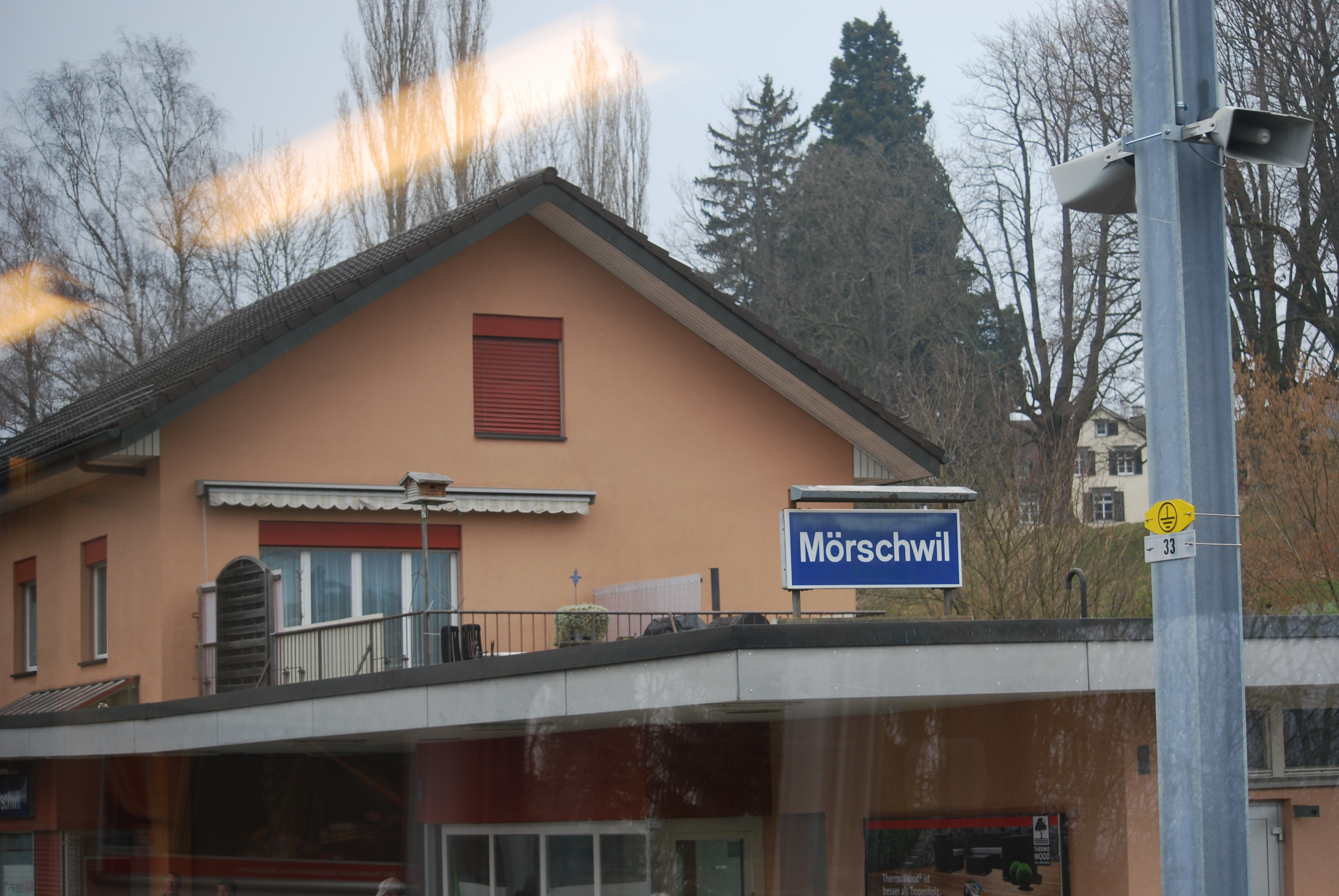

- Coat of arms
- Location of Mörschwil
- Location within Switzerland Location within Canton of St. Gallen
- Coordinates: 47°28′N 9°25′E
- Country: Switzerland
- Canton: St. Gallen
- District: Rorschach

Government
  - Mayor: Paul Bühler

Area
  - Total: 9.83 km^{2} (3.80 sq mi)
- Elevation: 550 m (1,800 ft)

Population (December 2020)
  - Total: 3,676
  - Density: 374/km^{2} (969/sq mi)
- Time zone: UTC+01:00 (CET)
  - Summer (DST): UTC+02:00 (CEST)
- Postal code: 9402
- SFOS number: 3214
- ISO 3166 code: CH-SG
- Surrounded by: Berg, Goldach, St. Gallen, Steinach, Tübach, Untereggen, Wittenbach
- Website: moerschwil.ch

Mörschwil is a municipality in the Wahlkreis (constituency) of Rorschach in the canton of St. Gallen in Switzerland.

== History ==
Mörschwil is first mentioned in 811 as Maurini vilare. In 1389 it was mentioned as Mörswile.

== Geography ==
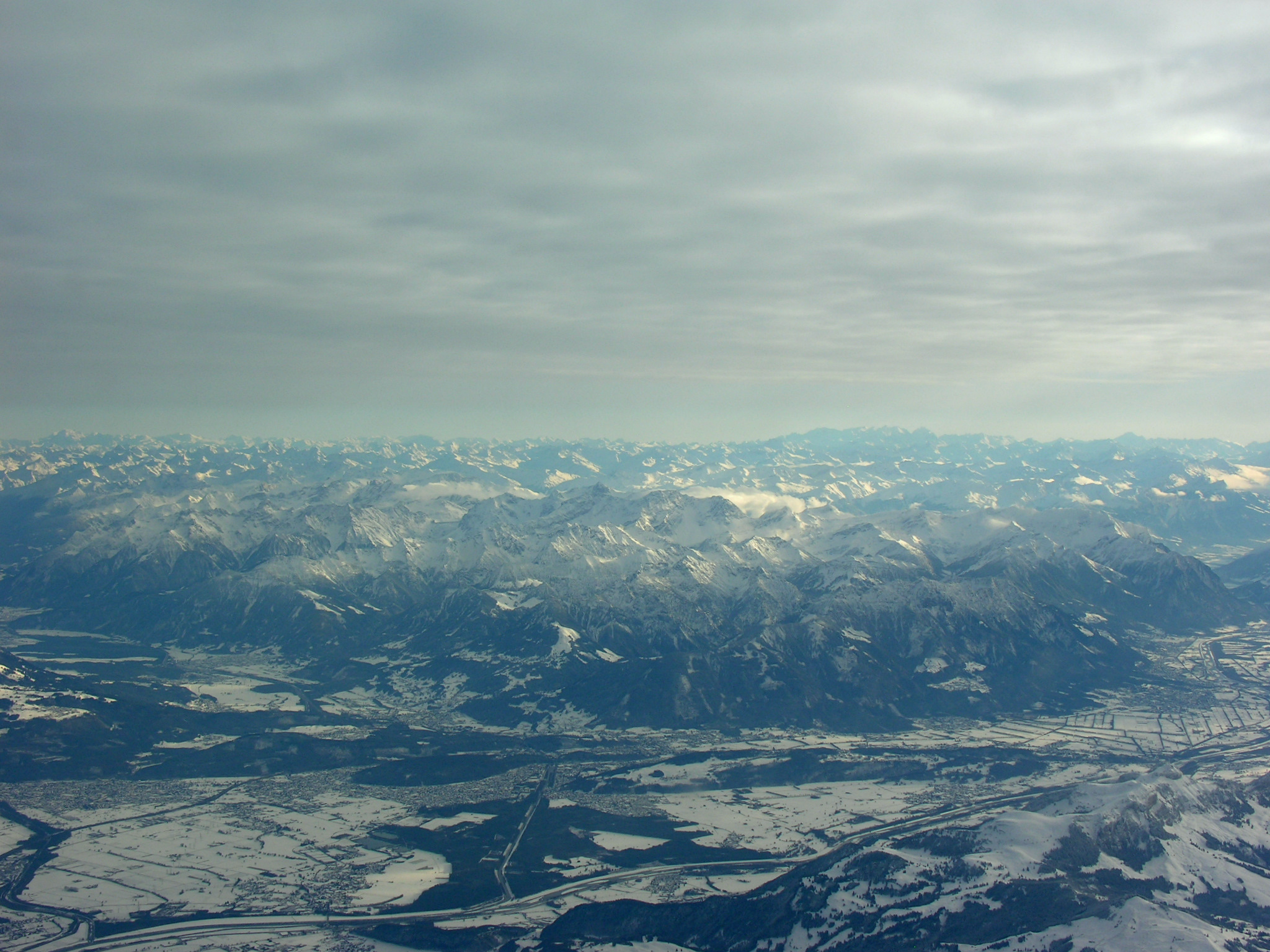
Aerial View of Rhine Valley and Austrial Alps from overhead Mörschwil (2008)

Aerial view from 400 m by Walter Mittelholzer (1923)

Mörschwil has an area, as of 2006, of 9.9 km^{2} (3.8 sq mi). Of this area, 59.2% is used for agricultural purposes, while 22% is forested. Of the rest of the land, 18.2% is settled (buildings or roads) and the remainder (0.6%) is non-productive (rivers or lakes).

The municipality is located in the Rorschach Wahlkreis. It is located on the cantonal road from Rorschach to St. Gallen between the Steinach and Goldach rivers. It consists of the village of Mörschwil and many scattered hamlets and individual houses.

== Coat of arms ==
The blazon of the municipal coat of arms is Gules a Griffin passant Or.

== Demographics ==
Mörschwil has a population (as of 31 December 2020) of 3,676. As of 2007, about 7.2% of the population was made up of foreign nationals. Of the foreign population, (as of 2000), 66 are from Germany, 32 are from Italy, 40 are from ex-Yugoslavia, 20 are from Austria, and 55 are from another country. Over the last 10 years the population has grown at a rate of 13.4%. Most of the population (as of 2000) speaks German (96.7%), with Albanian being second most common ( 0.6%) and French being third ( 0.4%). Of the Swiss national languages (as of 2000), 3,013 speak German, 14 people speak French, 12 people speak Italian, and 3 people speak Romansh.

The age distribution, as of 2000, in Mörschwil is; 427 children or 13.7% of the population are between 0 and 9 years old and 472 teenagers or 15.1% are between 10 and 19. Of the adult population, 323 people or 10.4% of the population are between 20 and 29 years old. 512 people or 16.4% are between 30 and 39, 498 people or 16.0% are between 40 and 49, and 430 people or 13.8% are between 50 and 59. The senior population distribution is 223 people or 7.2% of the population are between 60 and 69 years old, 163 people or 5.2% are between 70 and 79, there are 62 people or 2.0% who are between 80 and 89, and there are 6 people or 0.2% who are between 90 and 99.

In 2000 there were 278 persons (or 8.9% of the population) who were living alone in a private dwelling. There were 655 (or 21.0%) persons who were part of a couple (married or otherwise committed) without children, and 1,951 (or 62.6%) who were part of a couple with children. There were 105 (or 3.4%) people who lived in single parent home, while there are 24 persons who were adult children living with one or both parents, 31 persons who lived in a household made up of relatives, 13 who lived household made up of unrelated persons, and 59 who are either institutionalized or live in another type of collective housing.

In the 2007 federal election the most popular party was the SVP which received 32.6% of the vote. The next three most popular parties were the CVP (26.3%), the FDP (17.3%) and the SP (9.2%).

In Mörschwil about 86.1% of the population (between age 25–64) have completed either non-mandatory upper secondary education or additional higher education (either university or a Fachhochschule). Out of the total population in Mörschwil, as of 2000, the highest education level completed by 457 people (14.7% of the population) was Primary, while 1,171 (37.6%) have completed their secondary education, 616 (19.8%) have attended a Tertiary school, and 72 (2.3%) are not in school. The remainder did not answer this question.

The historical population is given in the following table:

year	population
1809	1,324
1850	1,249
1900	1,584
1950	1,649
2000	3,116

== Economy ==
As of 2007, Mörschwil had an unemployment rate of 0.68%. As of 2005, there were 124 people employed in the primary economic sector and about 45 businesses involved in this sector. 432 people are employed in the secondary sector and there are 32 businesses in this sector. 459 people are employed in the tertiary sector, with 93 businesses in this sector.

As of October 2009 the average unemployment rate was 1.3%. There were 165 businesses in the municipality of which 30 were involved in the secondary sector of the economy while 95 were involved in the third.

As of 2000 there were 426 residents who worked in the municipality, while 1,228 residents worked outside Mörschwil and 509 people commuted into the municipality for work.

== Religion ==
From the 2000 census, 1,912 or 61.4% are Roman Catholic, while 817 or 26.2% belonged to the Swiss Reformed Church. Of the rest of the population, there are 10 individuals (or about 0.32% of the population) who belong to the Orthodox Church, and there are 48 individuals (or about 1.54% of the population) who belong to another Christian church. There are 7 individuals (or about 0.22% of the population) who are Jewish, and 14 (or about 0.45% of the population) who are Islamic. There are 4 individuals (or about 0.13% of the population) who belong to another church (not listed on the census), 235 (or about 7.54% of the population) belong to no church, are agnostic or atheist, and 69 individuals (or about 2.21% of the population) did not answer the question.

== Sights ==
The Schlosslandschaft Rorschach / Alter Rhein, a number of castles in a region along the Rhine river, is designated as part of the Inventory of Swiss Heritage Sites. The Schlosslandschaft is shared between Berg, Goldach, Mörschwil, Rheineck, Rorschacherberg, St. Margrethen, Steinach, Thal and Tübach.
