= Ruth Erat =

Swiss teacher, author, painter and politician

Ruth Erat (born 3 August 1951 in Herisau, Switzerland) is a Swiss teacher, author, painter, and politician.

== Life ==
Erat grew up in Bern and Arbon and holds a degree from the University of Zurich. She obtained her PhD in 1985 after completing a thesis on Mechthild of Magdeburg. After completing her education, she began work as a teacher and as a district school superintendent at the teacher training college in Rorschach.

She has also worked as a painter and writer. In 1999 she participated in the Ingeborg Bachmann Competition in Klagenfurt.

Erat resides in Rheineck, where she also served from 1991 to 2001 as a council member. Her party affiliation was with the Social Democratic Party of Switzerland.

Ruth Erat is an author of narrative works and a member of the Association of Authors in Switzerland, the artists' professional association Visarte and the Swiss Werkbund. Visarte represents the interests of professional visual artists in Switzerland.

== Works ==
- Do sprach dú ellende Sele, Zürich 1985
- Moosbrand, Suhrkamp Verlag, Frankfurt am Main 1999

== Awards ==
- 1990 Workers' Literature Prize (Arbeiter Literaturpreis)
- 1995 Recognition Price by Culture Departement St. Gallen
- 2000 Book Award Canton Berne
- 2021 Main Award Akademie für gesprochenes Wort, Stuttgart
