= Berg, St. Gallen =

Berg
- Municipality
- Coat of arms
- Location of Berg
- Location within Switzerland Location within Canton of St. Gallen
- Coordinates: 47°14.5′N 8°57.5′E
- Country: Switzerland
- Canton: St. Gallen
- District: Rorschach

Government
  - Mayor: Sandro Parissenti

Area
  - Total: 3.74 km^{2} (1.44 sq mi)
- Elevation: 500 m (1,600 ft)

Population (December 2020)
  - Total: 866
  - Density: 232/km^{2} (600/sq mi)
- Time zone: UTC+01:00 (CET)
  - Summer (DST): UTC+02:00 (CEST)
- Postal code: 9305
- SFOS number: 3211
- ISO 3166 code: CH-SG
- Surrounded by: Arbon (TG), Mörschwil, Roggwil (TG), Steinach, Wittenbach
- Website: bergsg.ch

Berg (Swiss Standard German pronunciation: [bɛrɡ]) is a municipality in the Wahlkreis (constituency) of Rorschach in the canton of St. Gallen in Switzerland.

== History ==
Berg is first mentioned in 796 as ad Berga. In 837 it was mentioned as in villa nominata Perc.

== Geography ==
Aerial view from 800 m by Walter Mittelholzer (1923)

Berg has an area, as of 2006, of 3.8 km^{2} (1.5 sq mi). Of this area, 67.2% is used for agricultural purposes, while 19.8% is forested. Of the rest of the land, 12.4% is settled (buildings or roads) and the remainder (0.5%) is non-productive (rivers or lakes).

The municipality is located in the Rorschach Wahlkreis. The village is on the road between St. Gallen and Arbon and between Lake Constance and the hills that rise to the south and west of the lake. It consists of the villages of Ober and Unterberg since the Middle Ages.

== Coat of arms ==
The blazon of the municipal coat of arms is Azure issuant from Coupeaux Vert five branches Or three of them flowered and in chief two fleurs de lis of the same.

== Demographics ==
Berg has a population (as of 31 December 2020) of 866. As of 2007, about 10.7% of the population comprised foreign nationals. Of the foreign population, (as of 2000), 19 are from Germany, 8 are from Italy, 13 are from ex-Yugoslavia, 18 are from Austria, 4 are from Turkey, and 26 are from another country. Over the last 10 years the population has grown at a rate of 5.4%. Most of the population (as of 2000) speak German (94.3%), with Portuguese being second most common (1.3%) and Serbo-Croatian being third (0.8%). Of the Swiss national languages (as of 2000), 798 speak German, 2 people speak French, 4 people speak Italian, and 3 people speak Romansh.

The age distribution, as of 2000, in Berg is; 117 children or 13.8% of the population are between 0 and 9 years old and 133 teenagers or 15.7% are between 10 and 19. Of the adult population, 62 people or 7.3% of the population are between 20 and 29 years old. 137 people or 16.2% are between 30 and 39, 143 people or 16.9% are between 40 and 49, and 114 people or 13.5% are between 50 and 59. The senior population distribution is 88 people or 10.4% of the population are between 60 and 69 years old, 40 people or 4.7% are between 70 and 79, there are 12 people or 1.4% who are between 80 and 89.

In 2000 there were 66 persons (or 7.8% of the population) who were living alone in a private dwelling. There were 207 (or 24.5%) persons who were part of a couple (married or otherwise committed) without children, and 515 (or 60.9%) who were part of a couple with children. There were 34 (or 4.0%) people who lived in single parent home, while there are 8 persons who were adult children living with one or both parents, 6 persons who lived in a household made up of relatives, 4 who lived household made up of unrelated persons, and 6 who are either institutionalized or live in another type of collective housing.

In the 2007 federal election the most popular party was the SVP which received 35.2% of the vote. The next three most popular parties were the CVP (22.8%), the SP (12.5%) and the FDP (9.1%).

The entire Swiss population is generally well educated. In Berg about 82.9% of the population (between age 25–64) have completed either non-mandatory upper secondary education or additional higher education (either university or a Fachhochschule). Out of the total population in Berg, as of 2000, the highest education level completed by 146 people (17.3% of the population) was Primary, while 338 (40.0%) have completed Secondary, 124 (14.7%) have attended a Tertiary school, and 22 (2.6%) are not in school. The remainder did not answer this question.

The historical population is given in the following table:

year	population
1685	461
1850	528
1880	454
1900	497
1950	510
2000	846

== Economy ==
As of 2007, Berg had an unemployment rate of 1.4%. As of 2005, there were 76 people employed in the primary economic sector and about 21 businesses involved in this sector. 39 people are employed in the secondary sector and there are 6 businesses in this sector. 85 people are employed in the tertiary sector, with 23 businesses in this sector.

As of October 2009 the average unemployment rate was 1.8%. There were 52 businesses in the municipality of which 8 were involved in the secondary sector of the economy while 24 were involved in the third.

As of 2000 there were 114 residents who worked in the municipality, while 326 residents worked outside Berg and 34 people commuted into the municipality for work.

== Religion ==
From the 2000 census, 450 or 53.2% are Roman Catholic, while 219 or 25.9% belonged to the Swiss Reformed Church. Of the rest of the population, there are 8 individuals (or about 0.95% of the population) who belong to the Orthodox Church, and there are 49 individuals (or about 5.79% of the population) who belong to another Christian church. There is 1 individual who is Jewish, and 13 (or about 1.54% of the population) who are Islamic. 87 (or about 10.28% of the population) belong to no church, are agnostic or atheist, and 19 individuals (or about 2.25% of the population) did not answer the question.

== Transport ==
Berg sits on the Bodensee–Toggenburg line between Romanshorn and St. Gallen and is served by the St. Gallen S-Bahn at Roggwil-Berg railway station.

== Heritage sites of national significance ==
Kleiner Hahnberg Castle at Hahnberg 177 is listed as a Swiss heritage site of national significance.

There are three sites in the municipality that are part of the Inventory of Swiss Heritage Sites. The first is the hamlet of Zwingensteinhueb, while the second is the Hahnberg. The third is a shared site, the Schlosslandschaft Rorschach / Alter Rhein, a number of castles in a region along the Rhine river. The Schlosslandschaft is shared between Berg, Goldach, Mörschwil, Rheineck, Rorschacherberg, St. Margrethen, Steinach, Thal and Tübach.

== Personalities ==
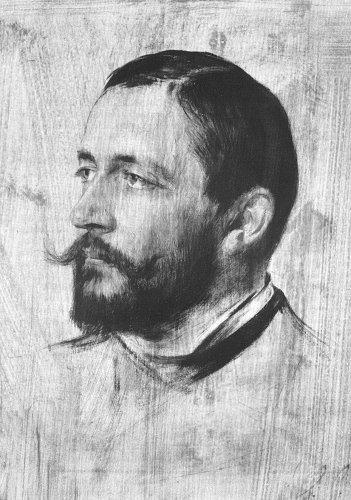
Cornelius Wilhelm von Heyl

- Jakob Schurtanner (c. 1450–1526), Catholic parish priest in Berg 1505–1507, Protestant-Reformed pastor in Teufen and reformer in Appenzellland
- Cornelius Wilhelm von Heyl to Herrnsheim (1843-1923), German politician and industrialist, died in Berg
- Vincent de Paul Wehrle (1855-1941), Benedictine and first bishop of Bismarck, North Dakota, USA, born in Berg
