= Tübach =

- Municipality
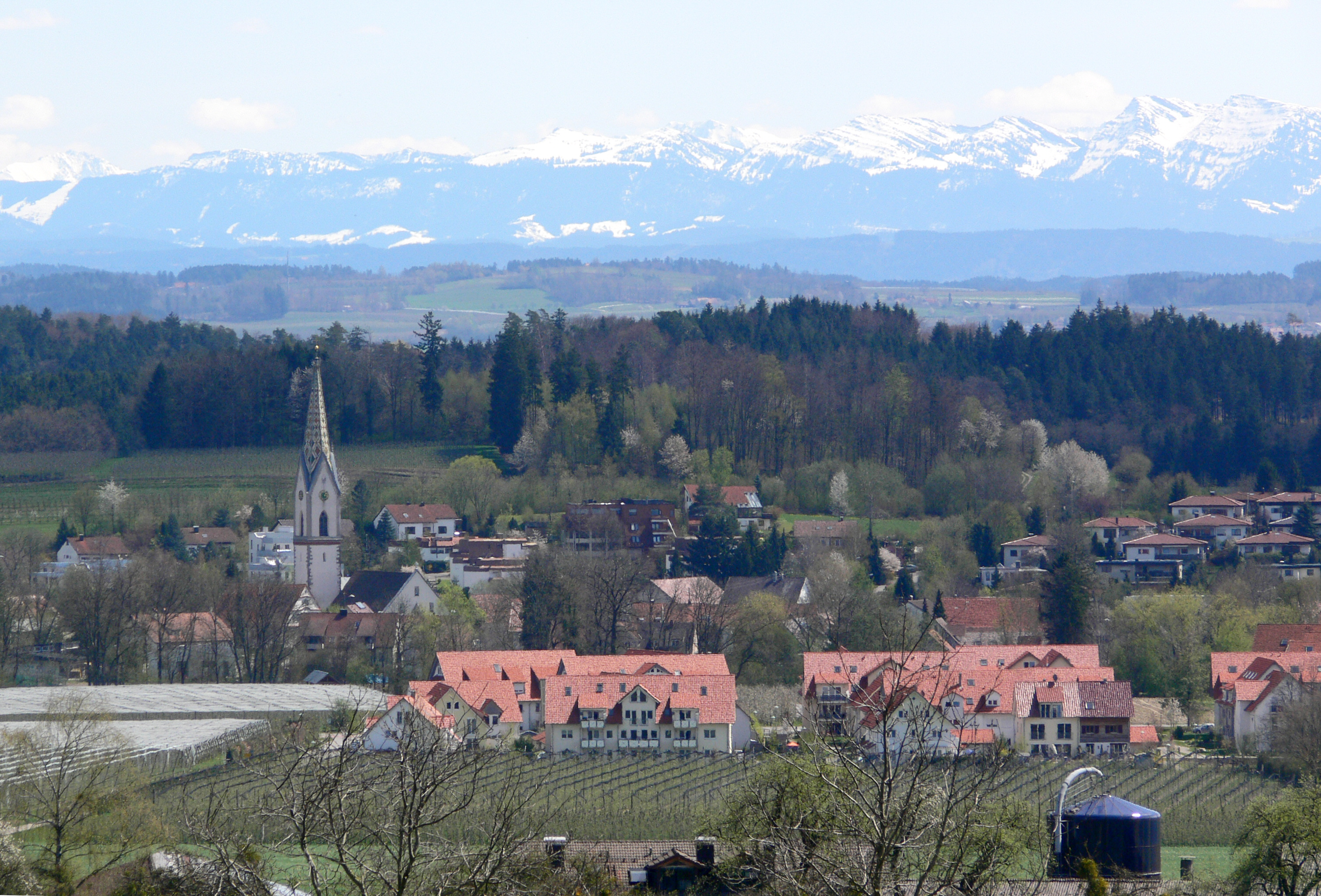

- Coat of arms
- Location of Tübach
- Location within Switzerland Location within Canton of St. Gallen
- Coordinates: 47°29′N 9°27′E
- Country: Switzerland
- Canton: St. Gallen
- District: Rorschach

Government
  - Mayor: Michael Götte

Area
  - Total: 1.99 km^{2} (0.77 sq mi)
- Elevation: 415 m (1,362 ft)

Population (December 2020)
  - Total: 1,494
  - Density: 751/km^{2} (1,940/sq mi)
- Time zone: UTC+01:00 (CET)
  - Summer (DST): UTC+02:00 (CEST)
- Postal code: 9327
- SFOS number: 3218
- ISO 3166 code: CH-SG
- Surrounded by: Goldach, Horn (TG), Mörschwil, Steinach
- Twin towns: Oberteuringen (Germany)
- Website: tuebach.ch

Tübach is a municipality in the Wahlkreis (constituency) of Rorschach in the canton of St. Gallen in Switzerland.

== Geography ==
Tübach has an area, as of 2006, of 2 km^{2} (0.77 sq mi). Of this area, 60.5% is used for agricultural purposes, while 7.7% is forested. The rest of the land, (31.8%) is settled.

Aerial view from 400 m by Walter Mittelholzer (1923)

== Coat of arms ==
The blazon of the municipal coat of arms is Argent a Bend wavy Azure and in chief sinister a letter T Gules.

== Demographics ==
Tübach has a population (as of 31 December 2020) of 1,494. As of 2007, about 10.9% of the population was made up of foreign nationals. Of the foreign population, (as of 2000), 31 are from Germany, 21 are from Italy, 15 are from ex-Yugoslavia, 23 are from Austria, 7 are from Turkey, and 27 are from another country. Over the last 10 years the population has grown at a rate of 8.6%. Most of the population (as of 2000) speaks German (95.9%), with Italian being second most common ( 1.1%) and Spanish being third ( 0.7%). Of the Swiss national languages (as of 2000), 1,014 speak German, 5 people speak French, 12 people speak Italian,

The age distribution, as of 2000, in Tübach is; 121 children or 11.4% of the population are between 0 and 9 years old and 134 teenagers or 12.7% are between 10 and 19. Of the adult population, 105 people or 9.9% of the population are between 20 and 29 years old. 171 people or 16.2% are between 30 and 39, 176 people or 16.7% are between 40 and 49, and 161 people or 15.2% are between 50 and 59. The senior population distribution is 109 people or 10.3% of the population are between 60 and 69 years old, 56 people or 5.3% are between 70 and 79, there are 23 people or 2.2% who are between 80 and 89, and there is 1 person who is between 90 and 99.

In 2000 there were 135 persons (or 12.8% of the population) who were living alone in a private dwelling. There were 285 (or 27.0%) persons who were part of a couple (married or otherwise committed) without children, and 556 (or 52.6%) who were part of a couple with children. There were 39 (or 3.7%) people who lived in single parent home, while there are 3 persons who were adult children living with one or both parents, 4 persons who lived in a household made up of relatives, 10 who lived household made up of unrelated persons, and 25 who are either institutionalized or live in another type of collective housing.

In the 2007 federal election the most popular party was the SVP which received 34.7% of the vote. The next three most popular parties were the CVP (22.8%), the SP (14.9%) and the FDP (13.9%).

In Tübach about 82.9% of the population (between age 25–64) have completed either non-mandatory upper secondary education or additional higher education (either university or a Fachhochschule). Out of the total population in Tübach, as of 2000, the highest education level completed by 192 people (18.2% of the population) was Primary, while 460 (43.5%) have completed their secondary education, 168 (15.9%) have attended a Tertiary school, and 21 (2.0%) are not in school. The remainder did not answer this question.

== Economy ==
As of 2007, Tübach had an unemployment rate of 1.06%. As of 2005, there were 18 people employed in the primary economic sector and about 9 businesses involved in this sector. 263 people are employed in the secondary sector and there are 25 businesses in this sector. 335 people are employed in the tertiary sector, with 55 businesses in this sector. As of October 2009 the average unemployment rate was 2.1%. There were 94 businesses in the municipality of which 26 were involved in the secondary sector of the economy while 58 were involved in the third. As of 2000 there were 170 residents who worked in the municipality, while 445 residents worked outside Tübach and 453 people commuted into the municipality for work.

== Religion ==
From the 2000 census, 636 or 60.2% are Roman Catholic, while 276 or 26.1% belonged to the Swiss Reformed Church. Of the rest of the population, there is 1 individual who belongs to the Christian Catholic faith, there are 6 individuals (or about 0.57% of the population) who belong to the Orthodox Church, and there are 12 individuals (or about 1.14% of the population) who belong to another Christian church. There are 16 (or about 1.51% of the population) who are Islamic. 103 (or about 9.74% of the population) belong to no church, are agnostic or atheist, and 7 individuals (or about 0.66% of the population) did not answer the question.

== Heritage sites of national significance ==
The Capuchin Abbey of St. Scholastika at Schulstrasse 38 is listed as a Swiss heritage site of national significance.

Additionally, the Schlosslandschaft Rorschach / Alter Rhein, a number of castles in a region along the Rhine river, is designated as part of the Inventory of Swiss Heritage Sites. The Schlosslandschaft is shared between Berg, Goldach, Mörschwil, Rheineck, Rorschacherberg, St. Margrethen, Steinach, Thal and Tübach.
