= Rorschacherberg =

- Municipality
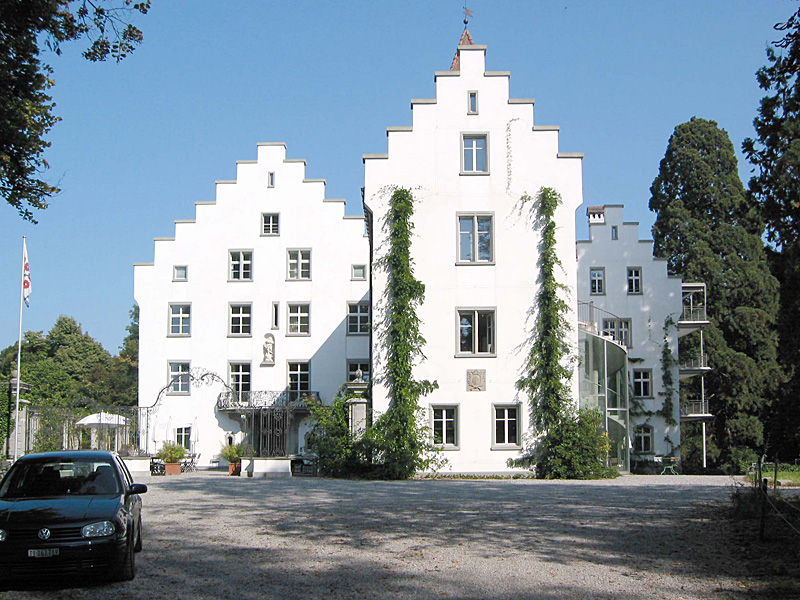
- Wartegg Castle in Rorschacherberg

- Coat of arms
- Location of Rorschacherberg
- Location within Switzerland Location within Canton of St. Gallen
- Coordinates: 47°28′N 9°30′E
- Country: Switzerland
- Canton: St. Gallen
- District: Rorschach

Government
  - Mayor: Beat Hirs

Area
  - Total: 7.11 km^{2} (2.75 sq mi)
- Elevation: 570 m (1,870 ft)

Population (December 2020)
  - Total: 7,465
  - Density: 1,050/km^{2} (2,720/sq mi)
- Time zone: UTC+01:00 (CET)
  - Summer (DST): UTC+02:00 (CEST)
- Postal code: 9404
- SFOS number: 3216
- ISO 3166 code: CH-SG
- Surrounded by: Eggersriet, Goldach, Horn (TG), Lutzenberg (AR), Rorschach, Thal, Untereggen
- Website: www.rorschacherberg.ch

Rorschacherberg is a municipality in the Wahlkreis (constituency) of Rorschach in the canton of St. Gallen in Switzerland.

== History ==
While some of the hamlets that make up Rorschacherberg are mentioned in the 13th and 14th centuries. The region known as Ro(r)schacherberg is first mentioned in the 15th century.

== Geography ==
Rorschacherberg has an area, as of 2006, of 7.1 km^{2} (2.7 sq mi). Of this area, 46.1% is used for agricultural purposes, while 26.3% is forested. Of the rest of the land, 27.2% is settled (buildings or roads) and the remainder (0.4%) is non-productive (rivers or lakes).

The municipality is located in the Rorschach Wahlkreis. It is an agglomeration of several settlements without a true village center. It is located above Rorschach in the hills, and near Unterstaad (which is east of Rorschach) it reaches Lake Constance. It consists of the a number of hamlets such as Rorschacherberg, Koblen, Eschlen and Hüttenmoos.

== Coat of arms ==
The blazon of the municipal coat of arms is Azure five Roses Gules barbed and seeded proper slipped Vert and conjoined issuant from Coupeaux Or on a Base Azure two bars of the first.

== Demographics ==
Rorschacherberg has a population (as of 31 December 2020) of 7,465. As of 2007, about 23.9% of the population was made up of foreign nationals. Of the foreign population, (as of 2000), 172 are from Germany, 303 are from Italy, 379 are from ex-Yugoslavia, 118 are from Austria, 163 are from Turkey, and 244 are from another country. Over the last 10 years the population has grown at a rate of 6.9%. Most of the population (as of 2000) speaks German (88.0%), with Serbo-Croatian being second most common ( 3.0%) and Italian being third ( 2.9%). Of the Swiss national languages (as of 2000), 5,708 speak German, 19 people speak French, 186 people speak Italian, and 5 people speak Romansh.

The age distribution, as of 2000, in Rorschacherberg is; 766 children or 11.8% of the population are between 0 and 9 years old and 853 teenagers or 13.2% are between 10 and 19. Of the adult population, 668 people or 10.3% of the population are between 20 and 29 years old. 970 people or 15.0% are between 30 and 39, 982 people or 15.1% are between 40 and 49, and 898 people or 13.9% are between 50 and 59. The senior population distribution is 574 people or 8.9% of the population are between 60 and 69 years old, 462 people or 7.1% are between 70 and 79, there are 260 people or 4.0% who are between 80 and 89, and there are 50 people or 0.8% who are between 90 and 99.

In 2000 there were 941 persons (or 14.5% of the population) who were living alone in a private dwelling. There were 1,504 (or 23.2%) persons who were part of a couple (married or otherwise committed) without children, and 3,344 (or 51.6%) who were part of a couple with children. There were 383 (or 5.9%) people who lived in single parent home, while there are 34 persons who were adult children living with one or both parents, 39 persons who lived in a household made up of relatives, 39 who lived household made up of unrelated persons, and 199 who are either institutionalized or live in another type of collective housing.

In the 2007 federal election the most popular party was the SVP which received 34.4% of the vote. The next three most popular parties were the CVP (20.7%), the SP (17.6%) and the FDP (13.9%).

In Rorschacherberg about 73.1% of the population (between age 25 and 64) have completed either non-mandatory upper secondary education or additional higher education (either university or a Fachhochschule). Out of the total population in Rorschacherberg, as of 2000, the highest education level completed by 1,553 people (24.0% of the population) was Primary, while 2,541 (39.2%) have completed their secondary education, 753 (11.6%) have attended a Tertiary school, and 207 (3.2%) are not in school. The remainder did not answer this question.

The historical population is given in the following table:

year	population
1468	21 H
1831	1,108
1850	1,075
1900	1,785
1950	2,705
2000	6,483

== Economy ==
As of 2007, Rorschacherberg had an unemployment rate of 2.41%. As of 2005, there were 60 people employed in the primary economic sector and about 24 businesses involved in this sector. 334 people are employed in the secondary sector and there are 49 businesses in this sector. 905 people are employed in the tertiary sector, with 115 businesses in this sector.

As of October 2009 the average unemployment rate was 3.8%. There were 192 businesses in the municipality of which 51 were involved in the secondary sector of the economy while 118 were involved in the third.

As of 2000 there were 667 residents who worked in the municipality, while 2,697 residents worked outside Rorschacherberg and 863 people commuted into the municipality for work.

== Religion ==
From the 2000 census, 3,122 or 48.2% are Roman Catholic, while 1,974 or 30.4% belonged to the Swiss Reformed Church. Of the rest of the population, there are 6 individuals (or about 0.09% of the population) who belong to the Christian Catholic faith, there are 200 individuals (or about 3.08% of the population) who belong to the Orthodox Church, and there are 234 individuals (or about 3.61% of the population) who belong to another Christian church. There are 286 (or about 4.41% of the population) who are Islamic. There are 27 individuals (or about 0.42% of the population) who belong to another church (not listed on the census), 588 (or about 9.07% of the population) belong to no church, are agnostic or atheist, and 46 individuals (or about 0.71% of the population) did not answer the question.

== Sights ==
The Schlosslandschaft Rorschach / Alter Rhein, a number of castles in a region along the Rhine river, is designated as part of the Inventory of Swiss Heritage Sites. The Schlosslandschaft is shared between Berg, Goldach, Mörschwil, Rheineck, Rorschacherberg, St. Margrethen, Steinach, Thal and Tübach.

== Transportation ==
There are two railway stations within the municipality, Seebleiche and Sandbüchel, both of which are located on the Rorschach–Heiden railway line and served by an hourly S-Bahn service (S25 of St. Gallen S-Bahn).
