= Goldach =

- Municipality
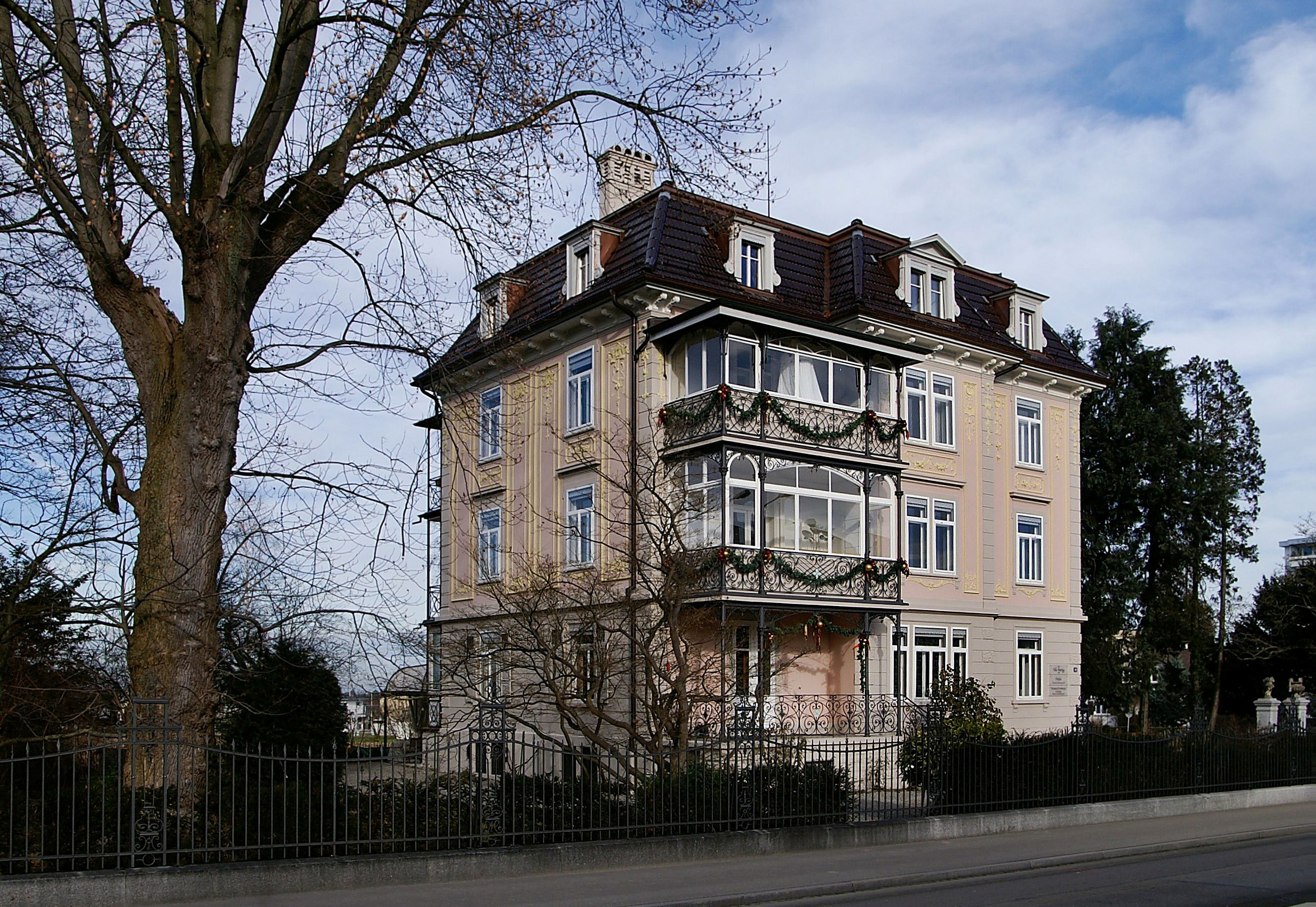
- Villa Wartegg in Goldach

- Coat of arms
- Location of Goldach
- Location within Switzerland Location within Canton of St. Gallen
- Coordinates: 47°28′43″N 9°28′11″E
- Country: Switzerland
- Canton: St. Gallen
- District: Rorschach

Government
  - Mayor: Thomas Würth

Area
  - Total: 4.68 km^{2} (1.81 sq mi)
- Elevation: 450 m (1,480 ft)

Population (December 2020)
  - Total: 9,476
  - Density: 2,020/km^{2} (5,240/sq mi)
- Time zone: UTC+01:00 (CET)
  - Summer (DST): UTC+02:00 (CEST)
- Postal code: 9403
- SFOS number: 3213
- ISO 3166 code: CH-SG
- Surrounded by: Horn (TG), Mörschwil, Rorschach, Rorschacherberg, Tübach, Untereggen
- Website: goldach.ch

Goldach is a municipality and a village in the Wahlkreis (constituency) of Rorschach in the canton of St. Gallen in Switzerland.

== History ==
Goldach is first mentioned in 789 as Goldaha, though this comes from a later copy of the original document. In 847 it was mentioned as Coldaun.

== Geography ==
Aerial view from 600 m by Walter Mittelholzer (1927)

Goldach has an area, as of 2006, of 4.7 km^{2} (1.8 sq mi). Of this area, 33.1% is used for agricultural purposes, while 12.7% is forested. Of the rest of the land, 51.9% is settled (buildings or roads) and the remainder (2.3%) is non-productive (rivers or lakes).

It is located on the southern coast of Lake Constance and extends the town Rorschach to the west. It consists of the village sections of Ober-Goldach, Unter-Goldach and Riet. The Goldach flows along the village‘s western border from that it derives its name. The main railway line to the eastern Swiss border runs through it and connects St. Gallen with Rorschach. There is also a local railway stop in Goldach. The A1 runs along its southern hill side.

== Coat of arms ==
The blazon of the municipal coat of arms is Azure two Bars wavy Or.

== Demographics ==
Goldach has a population (as of 31 December 2020) of 9,476. As of 2007, about 20.6% of the population was made up of foreign nationals. Of the foreign population, (as of 2000), 128 are from Germany, 625 are from Italy, 481 are from ex-Yugoslavia, 129 are from Austria, 69 are from Turkey, and 218 are from another country. Over the last 10 years the population has grown at a rate of 8.5%. Most of the population (as of 2000) speaks German (89.5%), with Italian being second most common ( 4.0%) and Serbo-Croatian being third ( 2.2%). Of the Swiss national languages (as of 2000), 7,552 speak German, 19 people speak French, 337 people speak Italian, and 12 people speak Romansh.

The age distribution, as of 2000, in Goldach is; 935 children or 11.1% of the population are between 0 and 9 years old and 1,029 teenagers or 12.2% are between 10 and 19. Of the adult population, 951 people or 11.3% of the population are between 20 and 29 years old. 1,395 people or 16.5% are between 30 and 39, 1,178 people or 14.0% are between 40 and 49, and 1,098 people or 13.0% are between 50 and 59. The senior population distribution is 862 people or 10.2% of the population are between 60 and 69 years old, 657 people or 7.8% are between 70 and 79, there are 289 people or 3.4% who are between 80 and 89, and there are 46 people or 0.5% who are between 90 and 99, and 1 person who is 100 or more.

In 2000 there were 1,176 persons (or 13.9% of the population) who were living alone in a private dwelling. There were 2,169 (or 25.7%) persons who were part of a couple (married or otherwise committed) without children, and 4,446 (or 52.7%) who were part of a couple with children. There were 390 (or 4.6%) people who lived in single parent home, while there are 49 persons who were adult children living with one or both parents, 40 persons who lived in a household made up of relatives, 59 who lived household made up of unrelated persons, and 112 who are either institutionalized or live in another type of collective housing.

In the 2007 federal election the most popular party was the SVP which received 36.1% of the vote. The next three most popular parties were the CVP (21.7%), the SP (18.4%) and the FDP (12.7%).

The entire Swiss population is generally well educated. In Goldach about 73.8% of the population (between age 25–64) have completed either non-mandatory upper secondary education or additional higher education (either university or a Fachhochschule). Out of the total population in Goldach, as of 2000, the highest education level completed by 1,939 people (23.0% of the population) was Primary, while 3,516 (41.7%) have completed Secondary, 939 (11.1%) have attended a Tertiary school, and 291 (3.4%) are not in school. The remainder did not answer this question.

The historical population is given in the following table:

year	population
1850	785
1880	1,388
1900	2,278
1910	4,007
1950	3,849
1960	6,233
2000	8,441

== Economy ==
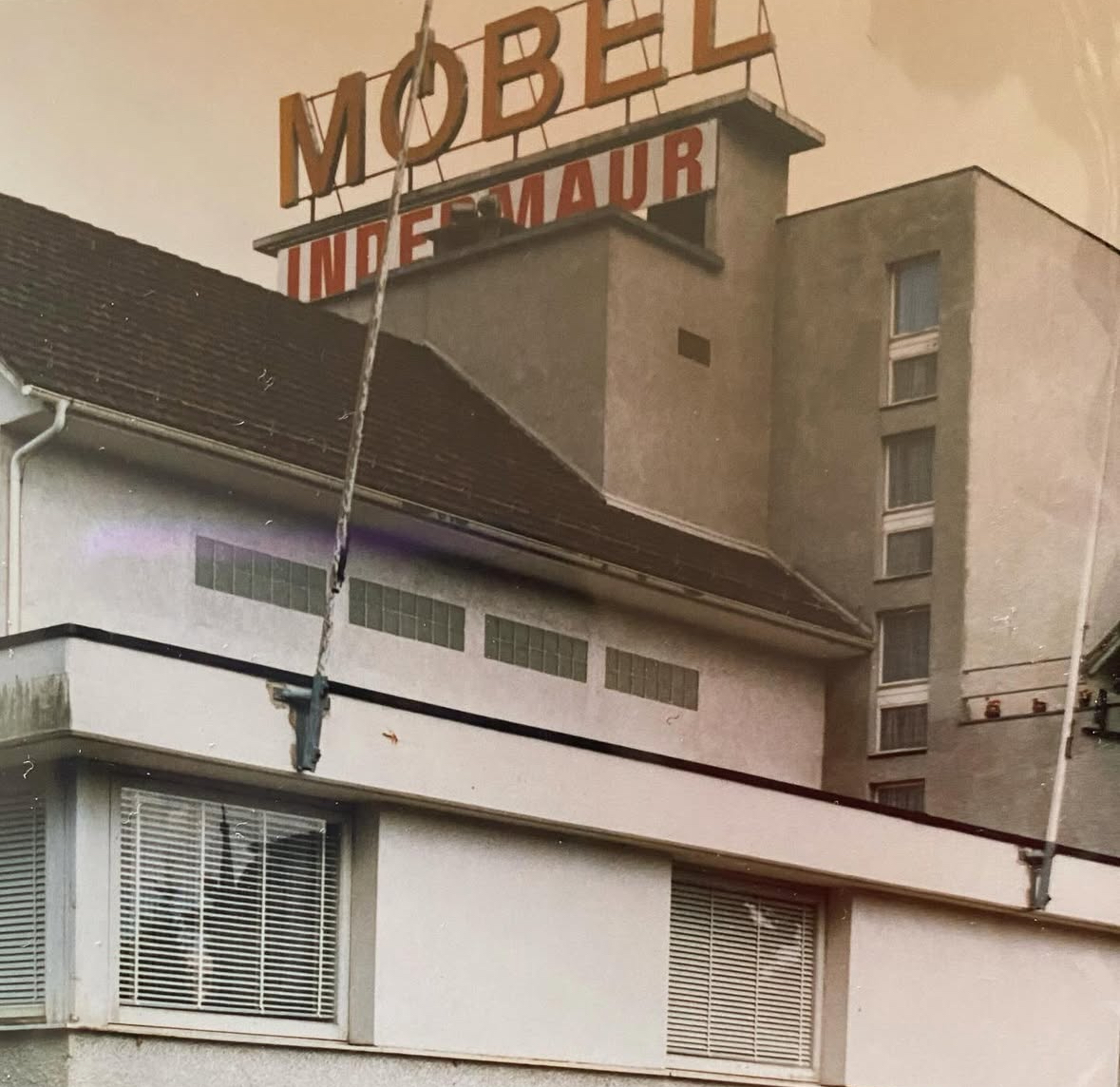
The Indermaur furniture company in 1998

In 2007, Goldach had an unemployment rate of 1.98%. In 2005, there were 65 people employed in the primary economic sector and about 12 businesses involved in this sector. 2,200 people are employed in the secondary sector, comprising 92 businesses. 1,613 people are employed in the tertiary sector, comprising 247 businesses. From 1895 to 2000, the Indermaur family ran Möbelhaus Indermaur, a large furniture building company in Goldach.

As of October 2009 the average unemployment rate was 3.6%. There were 345 businesses in the municipality of which 91 were involved in the secondary sector of the economy while 245 were involved in the third.

As of 2000 there were 1,169 residents who worked in the municipality, while 3,191 residents worked outside Goldach and 1,507 people commuted into the municipality for work.

== Religion ==
From the 2000 census, 4,729 or 56.0% are Roman Catholic, while 2,308 or 27.3% belonged to the Swiss Reformed Church. Of the rest of the population, there are 5 individuals (or about 0.06% of the population) who belong to the Christian Catholic faith, there are 229 individuals (or about 2.71% of the population) who belong to the Orthodox Church, and there are 215 individuals (or about 2.55% of the population) who belong to another Christian church. There are 306 (or about 3.63% of the population) who are Islamic. There are 25 individuals (or about 0.30% of the population) who belong to another church (not listed on the census), 549 (or about 6.50% of the population) belong to no church, are agnostic or atheist, and 75 individuals (or about 0.89% of the population) did not answer the question.

== Notable people ==
- Markus Gier, Olympic rower
- Michael Gier, Olympic rower
- Rudolf Hauser, racing cyclist
- Sebastian Gebhard Messmer, Roman Catholic prelate
- Alexander Zehnder, microbiologist

== Sights ==
The Schlosslandschaft Rorschach / Alter Rhein, a number of castles in a region along the Rhine river, is designated as part of the Inventory of Swiss Heritage Sites. The Schlosslandschaft is shared between Berg, Goldach, Mörschwil, Rheineck, Rorschacherberg, St. Margrethen, Steinach, Thal and Tübach.
