= Gaißau =

- Municipality

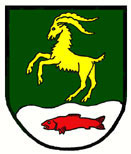
- Coat of arms

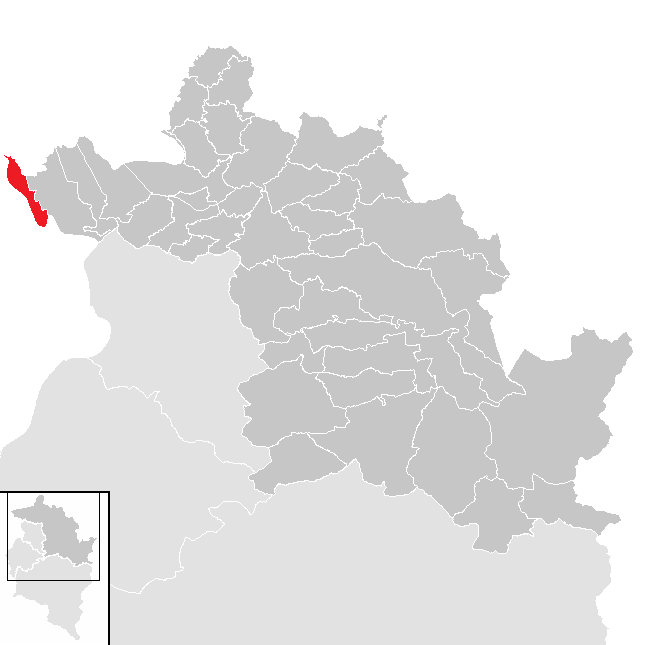
- Location in the district

- Location within Austria
- Coordinates: 47°28′00″N 09°35′00″E
- Country: Austria
- State: Vorarlberg
- District: Bregenz

Government
  - Mayor: Reinhold Eberle

Area
  - Total: 5.32 km^{2} (2.05 sq mi)
- Elevation: 396–400 m (1,299–1,312 ft)

Population (2018-01-01)
  - Total: 1,827
  - Density: 343/km^{2} (889/sq mi)
- Time zone: UTC+1 (CET)
  - Summer (DST): UTC+2 (CEST)
- Postal code: 6974
- Area code: 05578
- Vehicle registration: B
- Website: www.gaissau.at

Gaißau is a municipality in the district of Bregenz in the Austrian state of Vorarlberg.

== Population ==
Historical population
Year	Pop.	±%
1869	378	—
1880	458	+21.2%
1890	454	−0.9%
1900	436	−4.0%
1910	496	+13.8%
1923	500	+0.8%
1934	474	−5.2%
1939	452	−4.6%
1951	562	+24.3%
1961	644	+14.6%
1971	916	+42.2%
1981	1,045	+14.1%
1991	1,160	+11.0%
2001	1,486	+28.1%
2011	1,662	+11.8%
