= 2000–01 Ternana Calcio season =

Ternana Calcio
2000–01 season
- Manager: Andrea Agostinelli
- Stadium: Stadio Libero Liberati
- Serie B: 7th
- Coppa Italia: Group stage
- Top goalscorer: League: Corrado Grabbi (20); All: Corrado Grabbi (21)
- Biggest win: Ternana 4–0 Siena; Ternana 4–0 Ravenna
- Biggest defeat: Piacenza 3–0 Ternana
Home colours	Away colours	Third colours

The 2000–01 season was Ternana Calcio's 76th season in existence and third consecutive in the Serie B, the second division of Italian football. They also competed in the Coppa Italia.

== Players ==
=== First-team squad ===
Note: Flags indicate national team as defined under FIFA eligibility rules; some limited exceptions apply. Players may hold more than one non-FIFA nationality.

No.	Pos.	Nation	Player
—	GK	ITA	Daniele Balli
—	GK	ITA	Paolo Fabbri
—	GK	ITA	Gianmatteo Mareggini
—	DF	ITA	Alessandro Agostini
—	DF	ITA	Alessandro Cibocchi
—	DF	ITA	Marino D'Aloisio
—	DF	ITA	Gianluca Grava
—	DF	ITA	Stefano Lucchini
—	DF	ITA	Vittorio Mero
—	DF	ITA	Roberto Ripa
—	DF	ITA	Cristian Servidei
—	DF	CRO	Dario Smoje

No.	Pos.	Nation	Player
—	MF	ITA	Mirko Benin
—	MF	ITA	Francesco Dell'Anno
—	MF	ITA	Fabrizio Fabris
—	MF	ITA	Riccardo Gissi
—	MF	AUS	Vince Grella
—	MF	ITA	Luigi Riccio
—	MF	ITA	Roberto Romualdi
—	MF	ITA	Marco Schenardi
—	FW	NGR	Saidu Adeshina
—	FW	ITA	Massimo Borgobello
—	FW	ITA	Corrado Grabbi
—	FW	ITA	Fabrizio Miccoli
—	FW	AUS	Nick Rizzo

== Competitions ==
=== Overall record ===
Competition	First match	Last match	Starting round	Final position	Record							
Competition	First match	Last match	Starting round	Final position	Pld	W	D	L	GF	GA	GD	Win %
Serie B	3 September 2000	10 June 2001	Matchday 1	7th	38	16	14	8	59	38	+21	42.11
Coppa Italia	13 August 2000	20 August 2000	Group stage	Group stage	3	1	2	0	5	4	+1	33.33
Total					41	17	16	8	64	42	+22	41.46

Source: Competitions

=== Serie B ===
==== League table ====
Pos	Team	Pld	W	D	L	GF	GA	GD	Pts
5	Empoli	38	18	10	10	52	43	+9	64
6	Sampdoria	38	16	16	6	60	38	+22	64
7	Ternana	38	16	14	8	59	38	+21	62
8	Cosenza	38	17	9	12	49	46	+3	60
9	Crotone	38	15	8	15	47	53	−6	53

Source: Almanacco Illustrato del Calcio - La Storia 1898-2004, Panini Edizioni, Modena, September 2005
Rules for classification: 1) points; 2) head-to-head points; 3) head-to-head goal difference; 4) head-to-head goals scored; 5) goal difference; 6) number of goals scored.

==== Results summary ====
Overall								Home						Away					
Pld	W	D	L	GF	GA	GD	Pts	W	D	L	GF	GA	GD	W	D	L	GF	GA	GD
38	16	14	8	59	38	+21	62	13	4	2	38	12	+26	3	10	6	21	26	−5

==== Results by round ====
Round	1	2	3	4	5	6	7	8	9	10	11	12	13	14	15	16	17	18	19	20	21	22	23	24	25	26	27	28	29	30	31	32	33	34	35	36	37	38
Ground	A	H	A	H	A	H	A	H	H	A	H	A	H	A	H	A	A	H	A	H	A	H	A	H	A	H	A	A	H	A	H	A	H	A	H	H	A	H
Result	L	W	L	W	D	W	D	D	W	L	W	D	W	L	W	D	D	W	W	D	L	W	D	W	D	L	D	D	L	W	W	L	W	W	D	W	D	W
Position	13	9	13	10	12	8	6	9	5	9	6	8	4	7	6	6	6	4	4	4	8	5	6	5	5	7	7	7	8	7	7	7	7	6	6	5	7	7

A = Away; H = Home; W = Win; D = Draw; L = Loss

==== Matches ====
3 September 2000 1	Sampdoria	2–1	Ternana	Genoa
				Stadium: Stadio Luigi Ferraris

10 September 2000 2	Ternana	1–0	Chievo	Terni
				Stadium: Stadio Libero Liberati

17 September 2000 3	Cittadella	3–1	Ternana	Cittadella
				Stadium: Stadio Pier Cesare Tombolato

24 September 2000 4	Ternana	2–0	Empoli	Terni
				Stadium: Stadio Libero Liberati

1 October 2000 5	Siena	0–0	Ternana	Siena
				Stadium: Stadio Artemio Franchi

9 October 2000 6	Ternana	1–0	Genoa	Terni
	Miccoli (red card) 67'; Grabbi 76'		Rossini (yellow card) (yellow-red card) 60'; Boisfer (red card) 67'	Stadium: Stadio Libero Liberati; Referee: Diego Preschern

22 October 2000 7	Torino	1–1	Ternana	Turin
				Stadium: Stadio Delle Alpi

29 October 2000 8	Ternana	0–0	Salernitana	Terni
				Stadium: Stadio Libero Liberati

1 November 2000 8	Ternana	4–1	Monza	Terni
				Stadium: Stadio Libero Liberati

5 November 2000 10	Piacenza	3–0	Ternana	Piacenza
	Caccia 11', 35'; Cristallini 33'		Lucchini (red card) 60'	Stadium: Stadio Leonardo Garilli; Referee: Stefano Farina

12 November 2000 11	Ternana	3–2	Pistoiese	Terni
				Stadium: Stadio Libero Liberati

19 November 2000 12	Ravenna	2–2	Ternana	Ravenna
				Stadium: Stadio Bruno Benelli

26 November 2000 13	Ternana	3–1	Venezia	Terni
				Stadium: Stadio Libero Liberati

3 December 2000 14	Ancona	3–1	Ternana	Ancona
				Stadium: Stadio del Conero

10 December 2000 15	Ternana	3–0	Pescara	Terni
				Stadium: Stadio Libero Liberati

17 December 2000 16	Cosenza	0–0	Ternana	Cosenza
				Stadium: Stadio San Vito

23 December 2000 17	Treviso	1–1	Ternana	Treviso
				Stadium: Stadio Omobono Tenni

12 January 2001 18	Ternana	1–0	Cagliari	Terni
	Ripa 81'			Stadium: Stadio Libero Liberati; Referee: Alfredo Trentalange

22 January 2001 19	Crotone	0–2	Ternana	Crotone
				Stadium: Stadio Ezio Scida

28 January 2001 20	Ternana	1–1	Sampdoria	Terni
				Stadium: Stadio Libero Liberati

4 February 2001 21	Chievo	2–1	Ternana	Verona
				Stadium: Stadio Marcantonio Bentegodi

11 February 2001 22	Ternana	4–1	Cittadella	Terni
				Stadium: Stadio Libero Liberati

19 February 2001 23	Empoli	0–0	Ternana	Empoli
				Stadium: Stadio Carlo Castellani

25 February 2001 24	Ternana	4–0	Siena	Terni
				Stadium: Stadio Libero Liberati

4 March 2001 25	Genoa	2–2	Ternana	Genoa
	Francioso 33', 60' (pen.)		Grabbi 16'; Riccio 44'	Stadium: Stadio Luigi Ferraris; Referee: Pasquale Rodomonti

12 March 2001 26	Ternana	0–1	Torino	Terni
			Maspero 45'	Stadium: Stadio Libero Liberati; Referee: Stefano Farina

18 March 2001 27	Salernitana	0–0	Ternana	Salerno
				Stadium: Stadio Arechi

23 March 2001 28	Monza	1–1	Ternana	Monza
				Stadium: Stadio Brianteo

1 April 2001 29	Ternana	0–1	Piacenza	Terni
				Stadium: Stadio Libero Liberati

8 April 2001 30	Pistoiese	2–3	Ternana	Pistoia
	Bianchini 62'; Perrone 76'		Ripa 13', 66'; Borgobello 86'	Stadium: Stadio Marcello Melani; Referee: Danilo Nucini

14 April 2001 31	Ternana	4–0	Ravenna	Terni
				Stadium: Stadio Libero Liberati

23 April 2001 32	Venezia	2–1	Ternana	Venice
				Stadium: Stadio Pier Luigi Penzo

29 April 2001 33	Ternana	3–2	Ancona	Terni
				Stadium: Stadio Libero Liberati

12 May 2001 34	Pescara	1–3	Ternana	Pescara

20 May 2001 35	Ternana	1–1	Cosenza	Terni
				Stadium: Stadio Libero Liberati

27 May 2001 36	Ternana	3–1	Treviso	Terni
	Miccoli 46'; Suazo 61'; Adeshina 82'		Pizzi 33'	Stadium: Stadio Libero Liberati; Referee: Stefano Cassarà

3 June 2001 37	Cagliari	1–1	Ternana	Cagliari
	Suazo 39'		Adeshina 74'	Stadium: Stadio Sant'Elia; Referee: Diego Preschern

10 June 2001 38	Ternana	0–0	Crotone	Terni
				Stadium: Stadio Libero Liberati; Referee: Marco Gabriele

=== Coppa Italia ===
==== Group stage ====
Group 5

13 August 2000 1	Cesena	1–1	Ternana	Cesena
	Balli 36' (o.g.)		Teodorani 49'	Stadium: Stadio Dino Manuzzi; Referee: Andrea Zaltron

17 August 2000 2	Ternana	1–0	Varese	Terni
	Ripa 59'			Stadium: Stadio Libero Liberati; Referee: Emidio Morganti

20 August 2000 3	Torino	3–3	Ternana	Turin
	Schwoch 21' (pen.), 53', 62' (pen.)		Ripa 10'; Grabbi 50'; Adeshina 75'	Stadium: Stadio Delle Alpi; Referee: Tarcisio Serena
