= Rupert Moser =

Swiss anthropologist

- Born: 2 June 1944; Horn, Switzerland
- Died: August 2026 (aged 82)

Academic work
- Institutions: University of Bern

Rupert Moser (2 June 1944 – August 2026) was professor emeritus for social anthropology and African studies at the University of Bern. He conducted research on the paternal Ngoni (WaNgnoni) and the matrilineal Mwera in southern Tanzania. He did further work on the genesis of Swahili, migration and religious movements.
