= Frasnacht =

Village in Thurgau, Switzerland

- Former municipality
- A fountain in Frasnacht

- Coat of arms
- Location of Frasnacht
- Location within Switzerland Location within Canton of Thurgau
- Coordinates: 47.55°N 9.45°E
- Country: Switzerland
- Canton: Thurgau
- District: Arbon
- Municipality: Arbon

Population (1990)
  - Total: 1,372
- Time zone: UTC+01:00 (CET)
  - Summer (DST): UTC+02:00 (CEST)
- ISO 3166 code: CH-TG
- Website

Frasnacht is a former Ortsgemeinde (local commune) in the canton of Thurgau, Switzerland, now part of the municipality of Arbon in Arbon District. It separated from Egnach in 1857 and was an Ortsgemeinde of the Munizipalgemeinde (municipal commune) of Arbon until 1997. Frasnacht consisted of two separate areas: one comprised the small villages of Frasnacht, Kratzern and Steineloh on Lake Constance; the other, somewhat further south, included the settlements of Feilen, Stachen and Speiserslehn.

== History ==
Frasnacht is first mentioned in 1302 as Fraschnet. Before 1798 it shared the fate of Egnach and belonged to the Prince-Bishopric of Constance; a small part of Frasnacht and Steineloh belonged to the St. Gallen low court of Roggwil. The mostly Reformed community always belonged to the parish of Arbon. For this reason Frasnacht (Inner-Egnach) separated from the municipality of Egnach in 1857, and until 1997 it formed the Ortsgemeinde of Frasnacht in the Munizipalgemeinde of Arbon.

In the 19th century dairy farming and fruit growing replaced traditional arable farming, while the linen trade and embroidery offered opportunities for secondary income. In 1969 the Bruderer machine factory settled in Frasnacht; other industries (the Arbonia-Forster group) followed, and new housing was built. Frasnacht has almost grown together with Arbon. In 1996 it had 1,400 jobs in the predominant secondary sector.

The population was 523 in 1870, 654 in 1900, 679 in 1960 and 1,372 in 1990.

== Bibliography ==
- Hinweisinventar alter Bauten und Ortsbilder im Kanton Thurgau, manuscript, 1989 (State Archives of Thurgau)
