= Steinach railway station =

Railway station in the canton of St. Gallen, Switzerland

Steinach
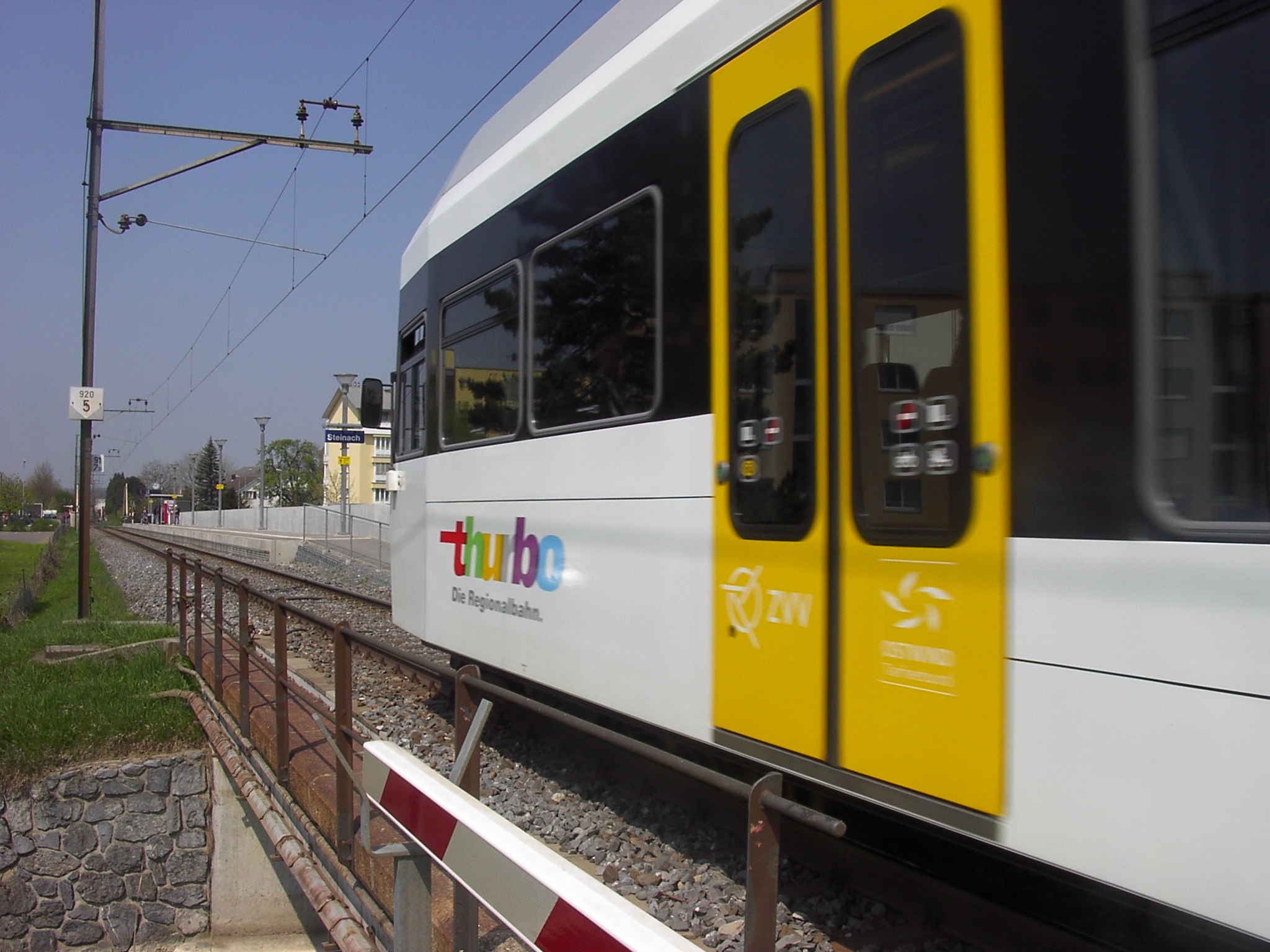

General information
- Location: Steinach; Switzerland
- Coordinates: 47°30′N 9°26′E
- Elevation: 402 m (1,319 ft)
- Owner: Swiss Federal Railways
- Line: Lake line
- Distance: 91.6 km (56.9 mi) from Zürich Hauptbahnhof
- Train operators: THURBO

Other information
- Fare zone: 230 (Tarifverbund Ostwind)

Services
Preceding station	St. Gallen S-Bahn	Following station
Arbon towards Weinfelden	S7	Horn towards Lindau-Insel
Location
- Location within Switzerland Location within Canton of St. Gallen

Steinach railway station (German: Bahnhof Steinach) is a railway station in Steinach, in the Swiss canton of St. Gallen. It is located on the Lake line of Swiss Federal Railways.

== Services ==
As of the December 2021 timetable change, the following services stop at Steinach:

- St. Gallen S-Bahn S7: half-hourly service between Rorschach and Romanshorn and hourly service to Weinfelden; on Saturdays and Sundays, service every two hours from Rorschach to Lindau-Reutin via Bregenz.
