= Arbon Seemoosriet railway station =

Railway station in Switzerland

Arbon Seemoosriet
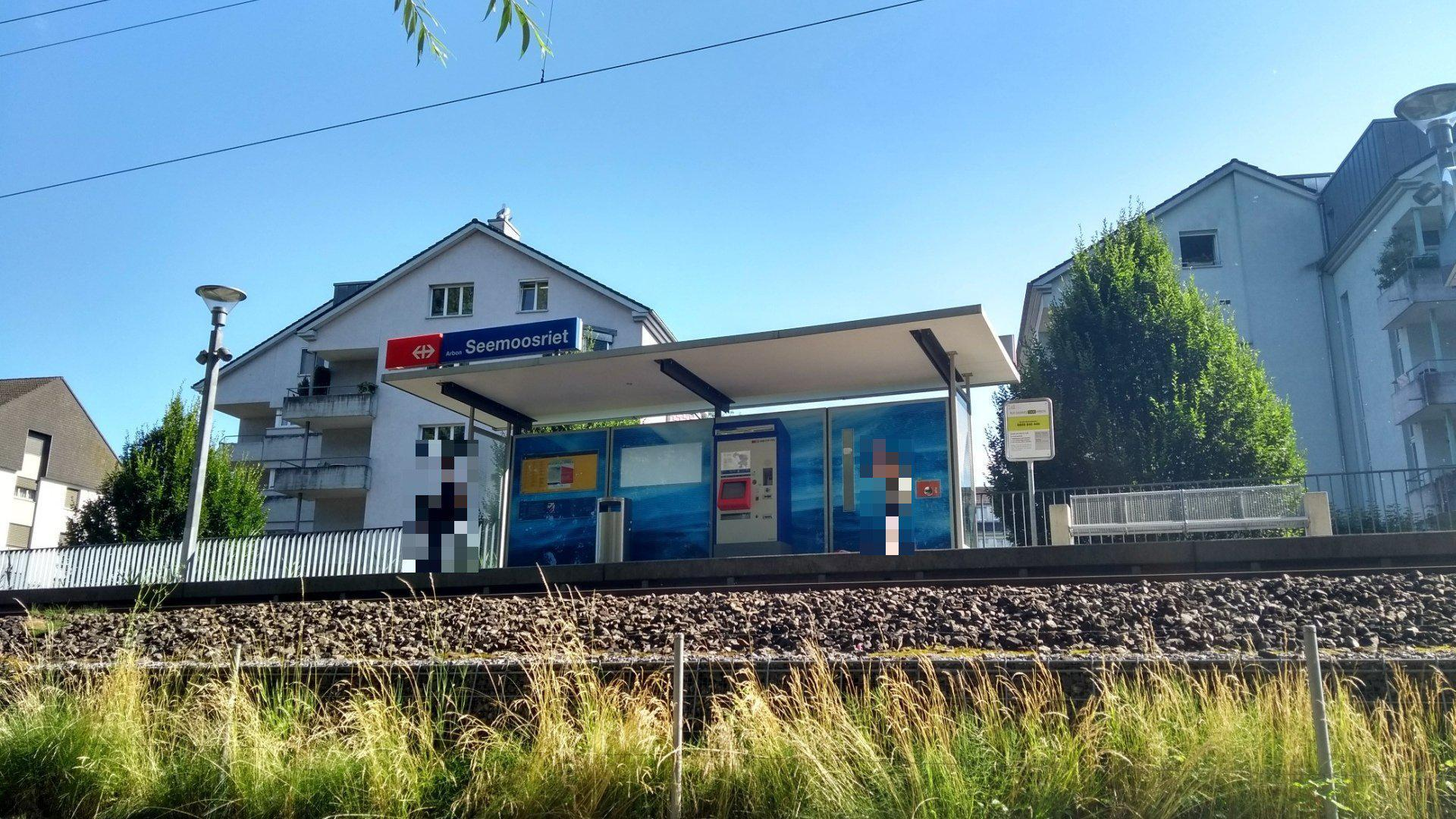
- The station in 2018

General information
- Location: Arbon; Switzerland
- Coordinates: 47°31′N 9°25′E
- Elevation: 402 m (1,319 ft)
- Owner: Swiss Federal Railways
- Line: Lake line
- Distance: 88.8 km (55.2 mi) from Zürich Hauptbahnhof
- Train operators: THURBO

Other information
- Fare zone: 230 (Tarifverbund Ostwind)

Services
Preceding station	St. Gallen S-Bahn	Following station
Egnach towards Weinfelden	S7	Arbon towards Lindau-Insel
Location
- Location within Switzerland Location within Canton of Thurgau

Arbon Seemoosriet railway station (German: Bahnhof Arbon Seemoosriet) is a railway station in the municipality of Arbon, in the Swiss canton of Thurgau. It is located on the Lake line of Swiss Federal Railways. It is one of two stations in the municipality; the other, Arbon, is the next station south on the line.

== Services ==
As of the December 2021 timetable change, the following services stop at Arbon Seemoosriet:

- St. Gallen S-Bahn S7: half-hourly service between Rorschach and Romanshorn and hourly service to Weinfelden; on Saturdays and Sundays, service every two hours from Rorschach to Lindau-Reutin via Bregenz.
