= Franz Saurer =

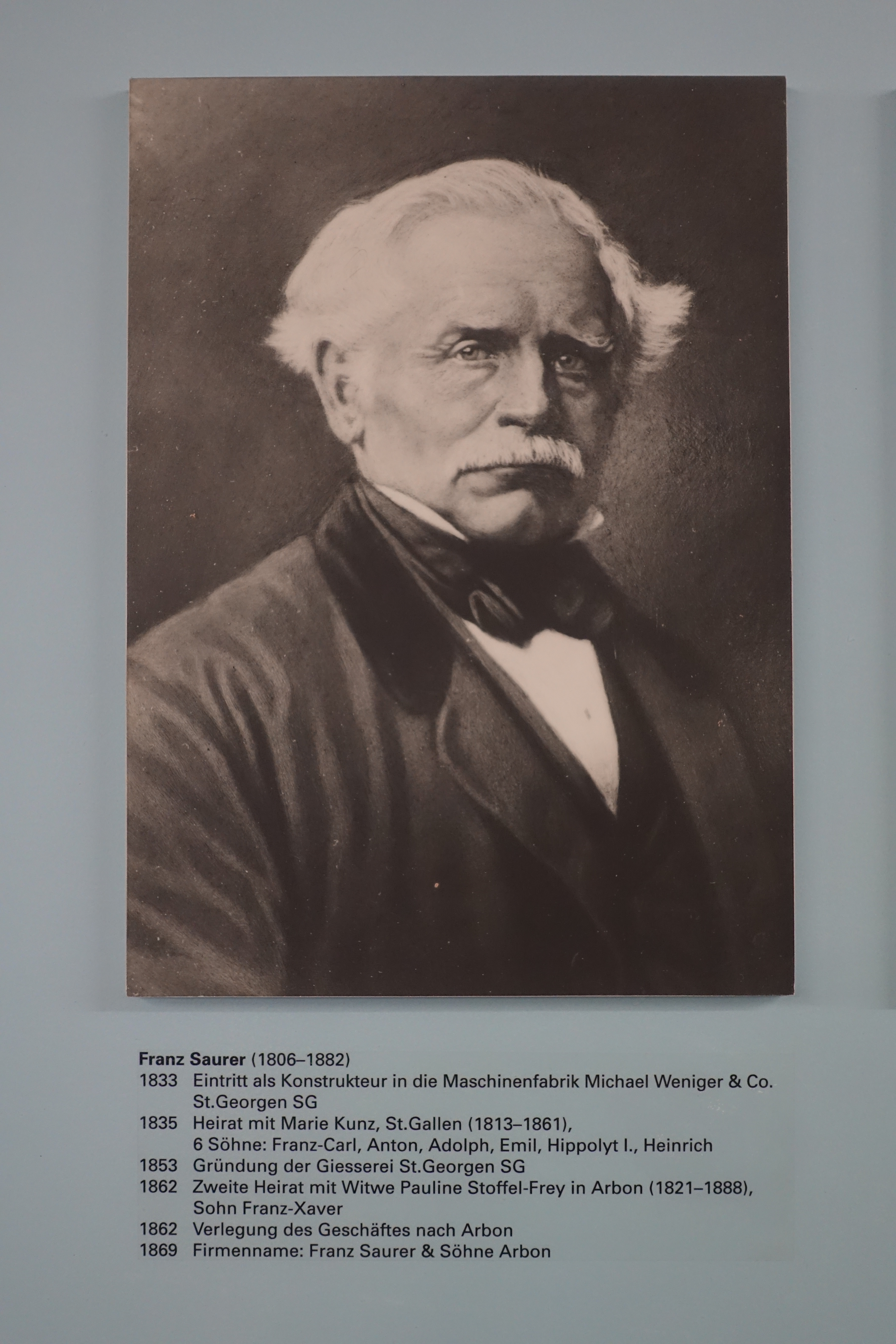
- Born: Franz Saurer; October 6, 1806; Veringendorf, Grand Duchy of Baden, German Empire
- Died: November 28, 1882 (aged 76); Arbon, Thurgau, Switzerland
- Occupation: Industrialist
- Known for: Founding and leading Saurer
- Spouses: Maria Catharina Kunz (m. 1835; died 1861) Maria Paulina Theresia Frei Stoffel (m. 1862, died)
- Children: 6

Franz Saurer (October 3, 1806 – November 28, 1882) was a German-born Swiss industrialist who founded the company which ultimately became the Adolph Saurer concern. He was also responsible for the positive economic development of the Arbon region. Through his estate his descendants endowed funds to build the city park of Arbon. He was the patriarch of the Saurer family.

== Early life and education ==
Saurer was born likely around October 3, 1806 in Veringendorf, Grand Duchy of Baden to farming parents Johann Nepomuk and Agatha (née Blum). His family was very poor which led him and a younger brother to move to Switzerland around 1821 aged 15. He initially went to Laufen am Rheinfall where he had a half-sister and was able to complete an apprenticeship as locksmith.

== Career ==
In 1827 he moved to Wülflingen near Winterthur where he was an employee at the mill construction firm Wimmersberger. In 1832, he found further employment at the machinery shop of Michael Weniger in Tablat near St. Gallen. In 1833, Saurer spent one year in Vienna, Austria.

== Personal life ==
On March 9, 1834, Saurer married Maria Catharina (née Kunz; 1813–1861) with whom he had six sons;

- Johann Anton known as Anton (April 28, 1835 - March 12, 1872)
- Franz Carl known as Carl (December 27, 1839 - January 4, 1850)
- Adolph (February 14, 1841 - February 23, 1920), later majority owner and namesake of Adolph Saurer Ltd.
- Julius Emil known as Emil (July 7, 1843 - October 19, 1896)
- Hippolyt Conrad (September 9, 1847 - September 21, 1877)
- Heinrich (December 26, 1848 - March 30, 1888)

Most of the sons of his first marriage died very young. After his wife died in 1861, Saurer decided to marry again, already in 1862. On August 11, 1862, he married Maria Paulina Theresia Stoffel (née Frei; 1821–1888), who was previously married to Franz Xaver Stoffel and was sole heir to his estate. Stoffel operated a machinery plant and also had substantial land holdings in Arbon which were integrated into the Saurer company.

Saurer died on November 28, 1882, in Arbon aged 76.

== Legacy ==
After his death, the descendants of Franz Saurer, endowed funds from his estate in order to construct the city park of Arbon. Today there are still landmarks/statutes of the founders of Saurer to be viewed.
