= Horn railway station =

Railway station in Switzerland

Horn
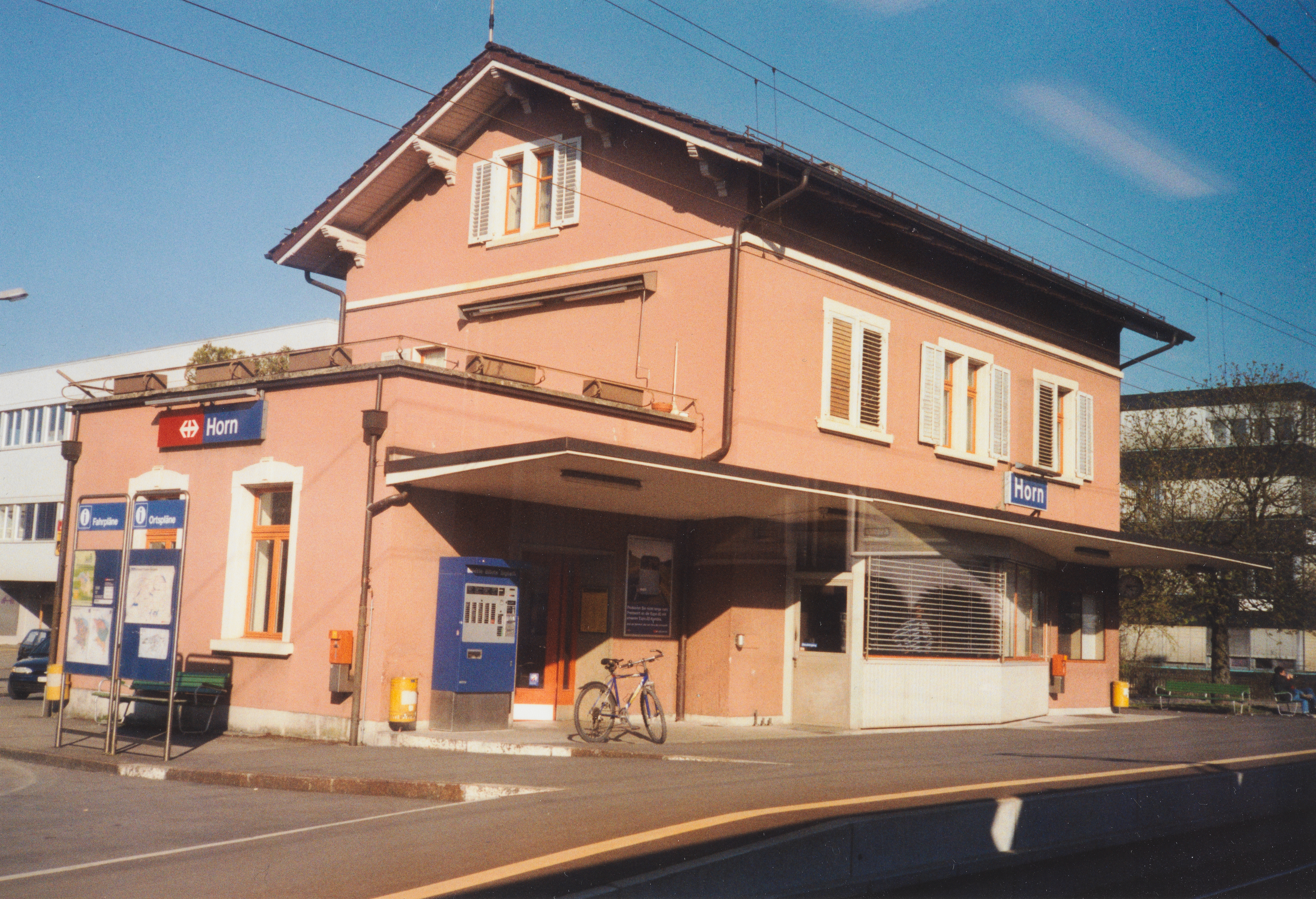
- Horn station in 2002.

General information
- Location: Horn; Switzerland
- Coordinates: 47°29′N 9°28′E
- Elevation: 403 m (1,322 ft)
- Owner: Swiss Federal Railways
- Line: Lake line
- Distance: 93.5 km (58.1 mi) from Zürich Hauptbahnhof
- Train operators: THURBO
- Connections: PostAuto Schweiz buses

Other information
- Fare zone: 230 (Tarifverbund Ostwind)

Services
Preceding station	St. Gallen S-Bahn	Following station
Steinach towards Weinfelden	S7	Rorschach Hafen towards Lindau-Insel
Location
- Location within Switzerland Location within Canton of Thurgau

Horn railway station (German: Bahnhof Horn) is a railway station in Horn, in the Swiss canton of Thurgau. It is located on the Lake line of Swiss Federal Railways.

== Services ==
As of the December 2021 timetable change, the following services stop at Horn:

- St. Gallen S-Bahn S7: half-hourly service between Rorschach and Romanshorn and hourly service to Weinfelden; on Saturdays and Sundays, service every two hours from Rorschach to Lindau-Reutin via Bregenz.
