= Arbonia =

Swiss building-components company

Arbonia AG

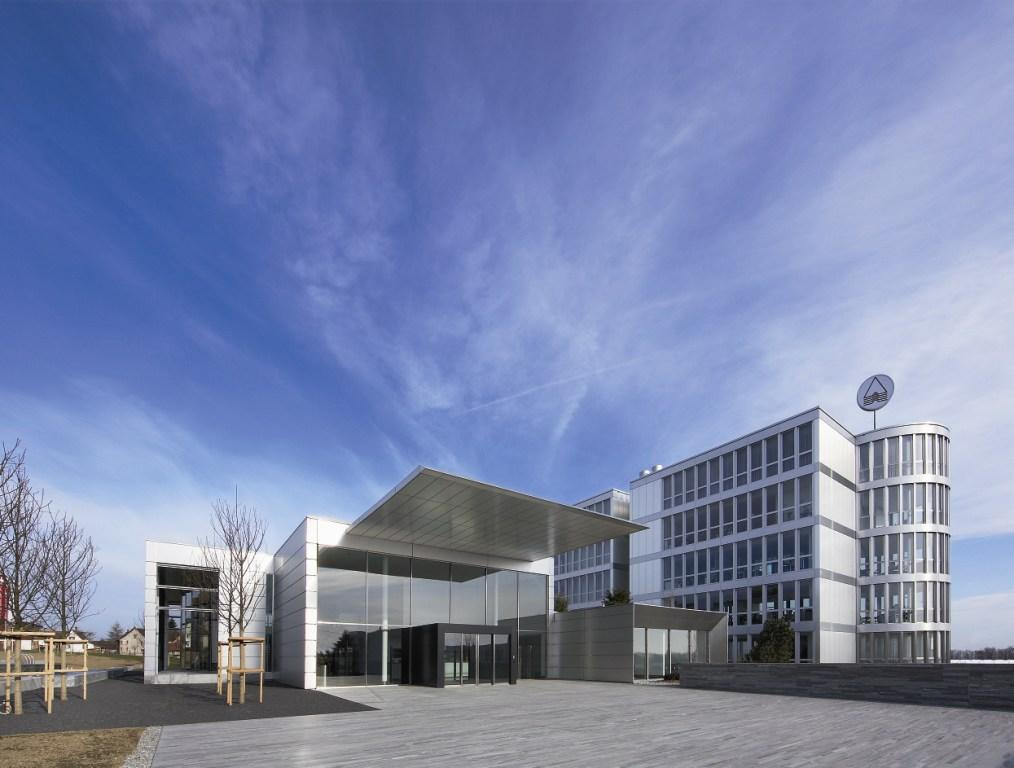
- Arbonia Corporate Center in Arbon
- Formerly: AFG Arbonia-Forster-Holding AG (1987–2016)
- Company type: Aktiengesellschaft
- Traded as: SIX: ARBN
- Industry: Building components
- Founded: 1874 (origins); 1987 (AFG holding)
- Founder: Franz Josef Forster
- Headquarters: Arbon, Switzerland
- Area served: Europe
- Key people: Alexander von Witzleben (chairman)
- Products: Interior and functional doors, heating, ventilation and air-conditioning technology
- Owner: Artemis Beteiligungen (Michael Pieper)
- Website: www.arbonia.com

Arbonia AG, formerly AFG Arbonia-Forster-Holding AG, is a Swiss building-components company based in Arbon, listed on the SIX Swiss Exchange.

== History ==
Franz Josef Forster opened a coppersmith's shop in 1874, whose activities expanded to the manufacture of steel tubes in 1915. Having become the company Hermann Forster AG in 1922, it also produced kitchens and refrigerators from 1953. The Arbonia works took its name from a model of stove top produced by the Karl Schnitzler appliance factory from 1919; Jakob Züllig, a master butcher, held a stake in it from 1957 and took it over in 1959.

In 1973 Züllig acquired the majority of Forster's shares and became chairman of the board of the group of companies comprising Forster (steel tubes, kitchens, refrigeration), Arbonia (radiators and heaters), Air Fröhlich (energy recovery), Asta (road transport), and Bühler-Regina (embroidery supplies). Named AFG Arbonia-Forster-Holding AG from 1987, the company was listed on the stock exchange in 1988. It took over the company Prolux (radiators) in 1999 but abandoned the energy-recovery business in 2000. In 2000 the group employed 1,913 people and had a turnover of 437 million francs.

Jakob Züllig, the majority shareholder and chairman, died in 1999. In 2001 AFG took over the German company Kermi, which substantially strengthened its radiator and shower-enclosure business. In 2003 the Züllig estate sold its majority stake to Edgar Oehler, who became CEO and chairman. Artemis Beteiligungen, led by Michael Pieper, later became the majority shareholder.

In 2016, in connection with the takeover of the Looser Group, AFG Arbonia-Forster-Holding AG was renamed Arbonia AG. The company subsequently refocused its portfolio on building components and divested several businesses. In 2023 it sold its Windows division, and in 2024 it agreed to sell its Heating, Ventilation and Air Conditioning (HVAC) division to Midea, leaving doors as its core business.

== Bibliography ==
- 100 Jahre Forster, 1974
- P. F. Portmann, "Die Arbonia-Forster-Gruppe", in Thurgauer Jahrbuch, 1982, 120–126
