= List of mayors of Arbon =

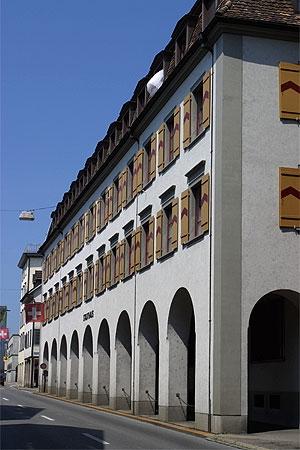
Stadthaus Arbon

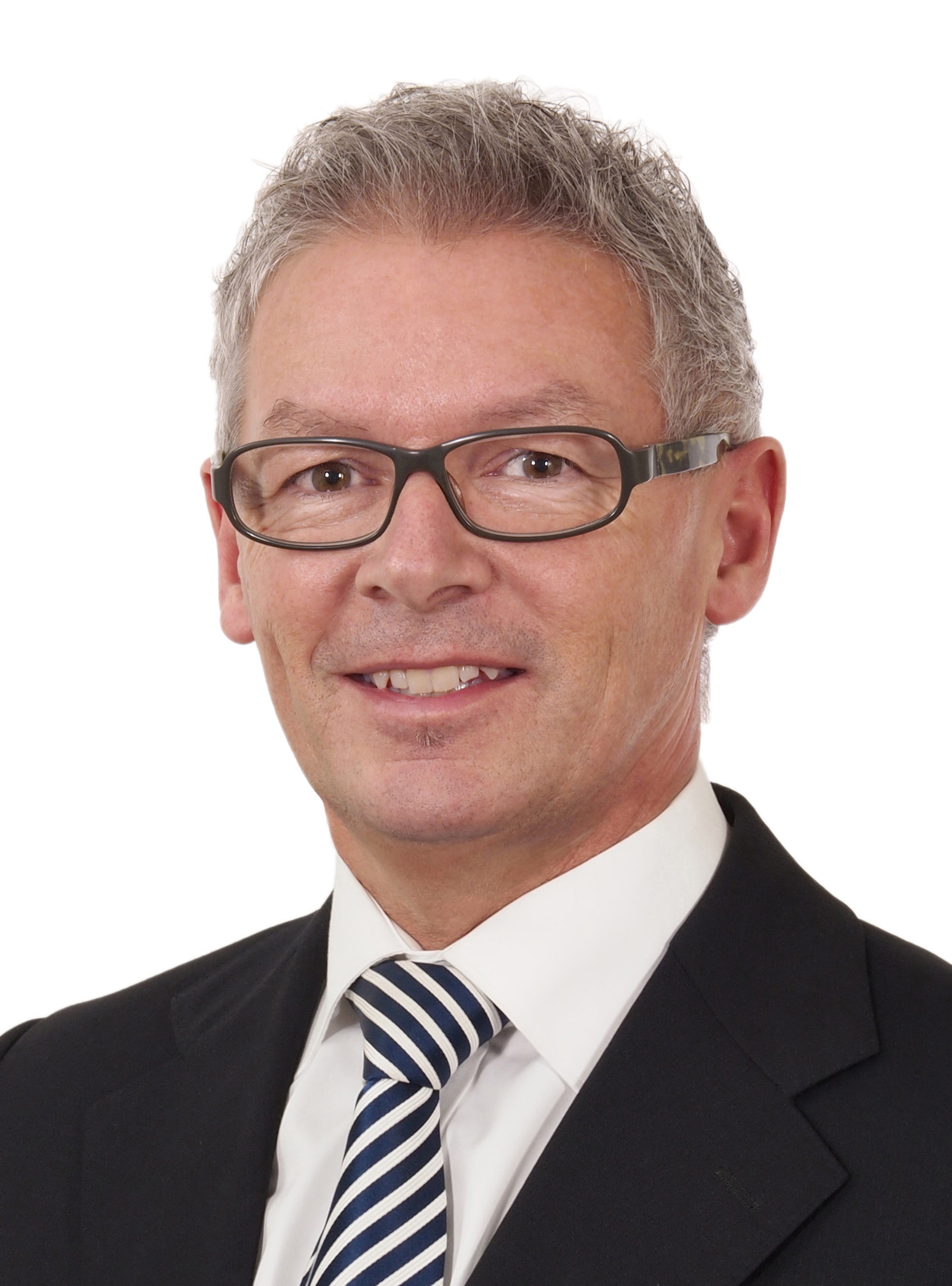
Martin Klöti, mayor 2006–2012, later member of the government of the canton of St. Gallen

Coat of arms of Arbon

This is a list of mayors of Arbon, Thurgau, Switzerland. The mayor of Arbon (Stadtammann von Arbon) chairs the city council (Stadtrat).

Mayor of Arbon
Term	Mayor	Lifespan	Party	Notes
(19 November 1477)	Hans Schlapperitzin			
1985–1999	Christoph Tobler		SVP/UDC	
1999–2003	Giosch Antoni Sgier	(born c. 1954)	CVP/PDC	
2003–2005	Lydia Buchmüller			
2006–2012	Martin Klöti	(born 1954)	FDP.Die Liberalen	
2012	Patrick Hug	(born c. 1958)	CVP/PDC	ad interim
2012–present	Andreas Balg	(born 1963)		
