= Arbon railway station =

Railway station in Switzerland

Arbon
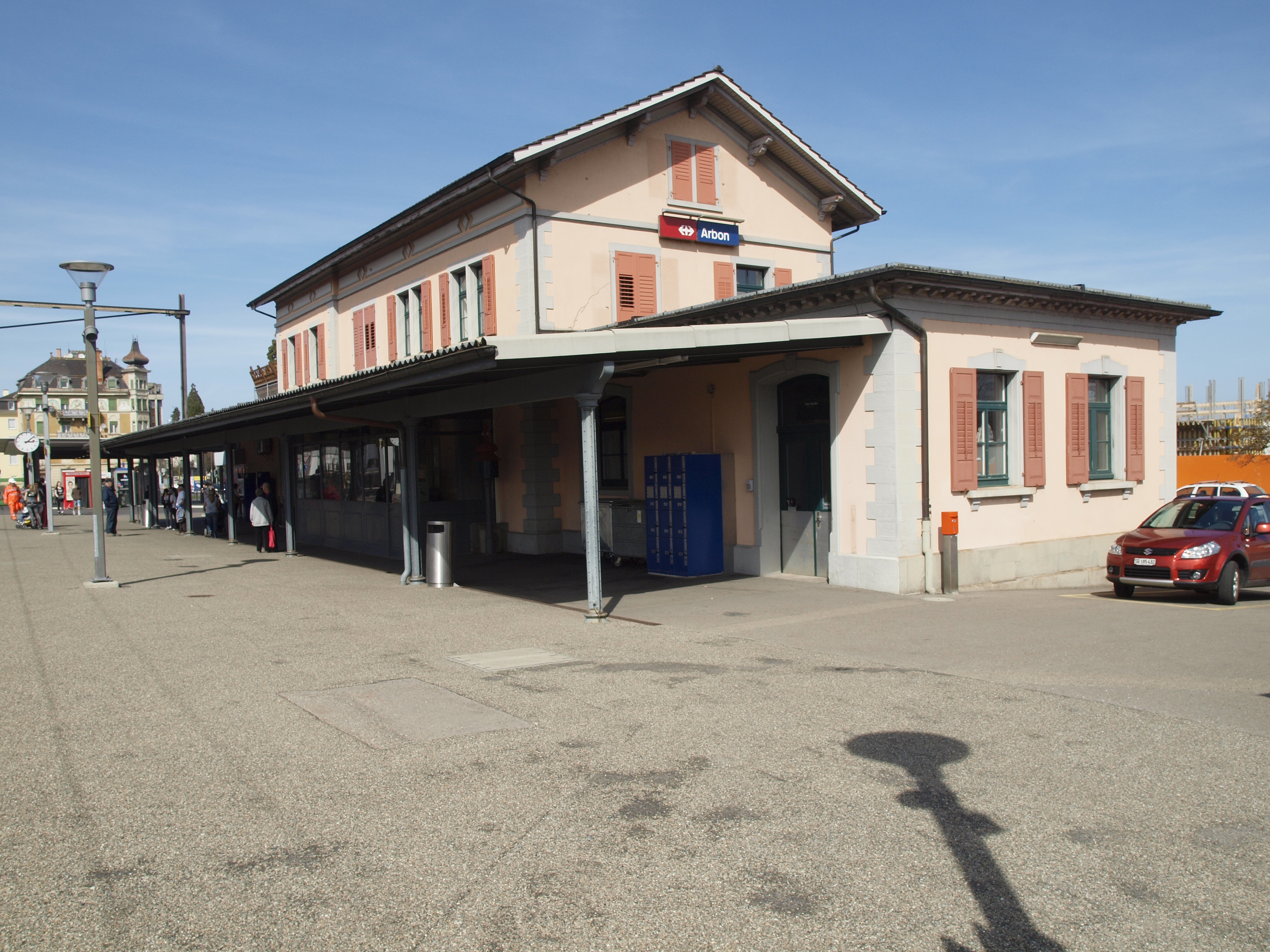
- The station building in 2014

General information
- Location: Arbon; Switzerland
- Coordinates: 47°31′N 9°26′E
- Elevation: 399 m (1,309 ft)
- Owner: Swiss Federal Railways
- Line: Lake line
- Distance: 90.3 km (56.1 mi) from Zürich Hauptbahnhof
- Train operators: THURBO
- Connections: PostAuto Schweiz and Autokurse Oberthurgau buses

Other information
- Fare zone: 230 (Tarifverbund Ostwind)

Services
Preceding station	St. Gallen S-Bahn	Following station
Arbon Seemoosriet towards Weinfelden	S7	Steinach towards Lindau-Insel
Location
- Location within Switzerland Location within Canton of Thurgau

Arbon railway station (German: Bahnhof Arbon) is a railway station in Arbon, in the Swiss canton of Thurgau. It is located on the Lake line of Swiss Federal Railways. It is one of two stations in the municipality; the other, Arbon Seemoosriet, is the next station north on the line.

== Services ==
As of the December 2021 timetable change, the following services stop at Arbon:

- St. Gallen S-Bahn S7: half-hourly service between Rorschach and Romanshorn and hourly service to Weinfelden; on Saturdays and Sundays, service every two hours from Rorschach to Lindau-Reutin via Bregenz.
