= S7 (St. Gallen S-Bahn) =

Railway service in Switzerland

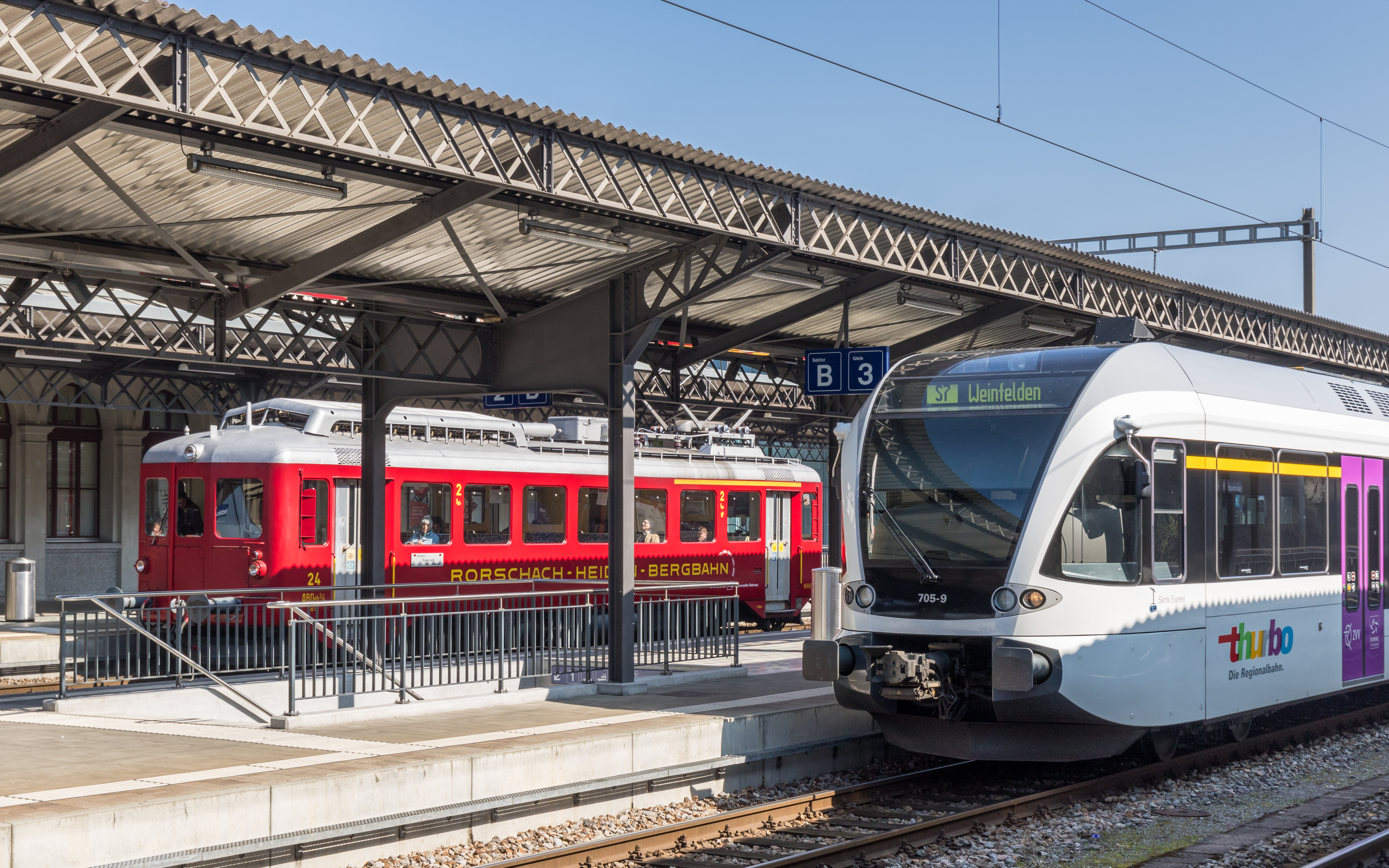
- A Weinfelden-bound S7 at Rorschach in 2017

Overview
- Current operator(s): Thurbo

Route
- Termini: Weinfelden / Romanshorn; Rorschach / Lindau-Insel
- Stops: 8 (14)
- Distance travelled: 71.8 kilometres (44.6 mi)
- Average journey time: 20 minutes (Romanshorn–Rorschach); 39 minutes (Weinfelden–Rorschach); 57 minutes (Romanshorn–Lindau-Insel)
- Service frequency: Every 30 minutes (Romanshorn–Rorschach); Every 60 minutes (Weinfelden–Rorschach); Every 2 hours (Romanshorn–Lindau-Insel)
- Line(s) used: Winterthur–Romanshorn line; Lake line; Chur–Rorschach line; St. Margrethen–Lauterach line; Vorarlberg line

The S7 is a railway service of the St. Gallen S-Bahn that provides half-hourly service between Romanshorn and Rorschach, with hourly service from Romanshorn to Weinfelden. Some trains continue from Rorschach to St. Margrethen, Bregenz (Vorarlberg, Austria) and Lindau (Bavaria, Germany) along the shores of Lake Constance (Bodensee). The line is also part of the Bodensee S-Bahn.

Thurbo, a joint venture of Swiss Federal Railways and the canton of Thurgau, operates the service.

== Operations ==
The S7 operates half-hourly over the Lake line between Romanshorn and Rorschach. It is the only service on that section of the line. Every other train operates over the Winterthur–Romanshorn line between Romanshorn and Weinfelden, stopping only at Amriswil. The S10 makes local stops over the line. As of December 2024, three trains operate on weekdays between Romanshorn and Lindau-Insel (Germany) via Bregenz (Austria); on weekends, this rises to one train every two hours. In Austria and Germany, the S7 operates as a Regionalexpress (REX7).

== Route ==
S7 (Weinfelden –) Romanshorn – Rorschach (– St. Margrethen – Bregenz – Lindau-Reutin – Lindau-Insel) (Note: Trains run half-hourly between Romanshorn and Rorschach and hourly between Weinfelden and Rorschach, Between Romanshorn and Lindau-Insel, the S7 operates every two hours on weekends and less frequently on weekdays)

- Weinfelden
- Amriswil
- Romanshorn
- Egnach
- Arbon Seemoosriet
- Arbon
- Steinach
- Horn
- Rorschach Hafen
- Rorschach
- St. Margrethen
- Bregenz
- Lindau-Reutin
- Lindau-Insel

== History ==
With the December 2021 timetable change, the Romanshorn–Rorschach trains were extended every two hours, on Saturdays and Sundays only, around the southern coast of Lake Constance to Bregenz and Lindau. Beginning on 10 December 2023, three Romanshorn–Lindau trains operated on weekdays. With the 2024 timetable change, the route was extended to Lindau-Insel.
