= Unisto =

Swiss Security Company

Unisto AG
- Unisto's head office in Horn, Switzerland.
- Type: Public
- Industry: Manufacturing
- Founded: 1926, Switzerland
- Founder: Hans Felix and Leo Stoffel
- Headquarters: Horn, Switzerland, Thurgovia, Switzerland
- Area served: Europe, Americas, Africa, Far East & Asia, Australia & New Zealand
- Key people: Peter Stoffel(CEO)
- Brands: Unisto Manta; Unisto SealTrak, etc.
- Revenue: CHF 15-38 Mio
- Total equity: CHF 1.5 Mio
- Number of employees: 600 (2013)
- Website: www.unisto.com

Unisto is a Swiss company that based on security products. It produces Unisto security seals, name badges and brand profiling products to guarantee the authenticity of a product from its manufacturing origin to its point of sale.

It was founded as Stoffel and Co. in Horn, Switzerland in 1926, a small family-owned business making packaging accessories used for brand labeling and securing products. The company later became an international company with more than 600 employees in factories and offices worldwide.
