= Egnach railway station =

Railway station on the Lake Line in Egnach, Thurgau

Egnach
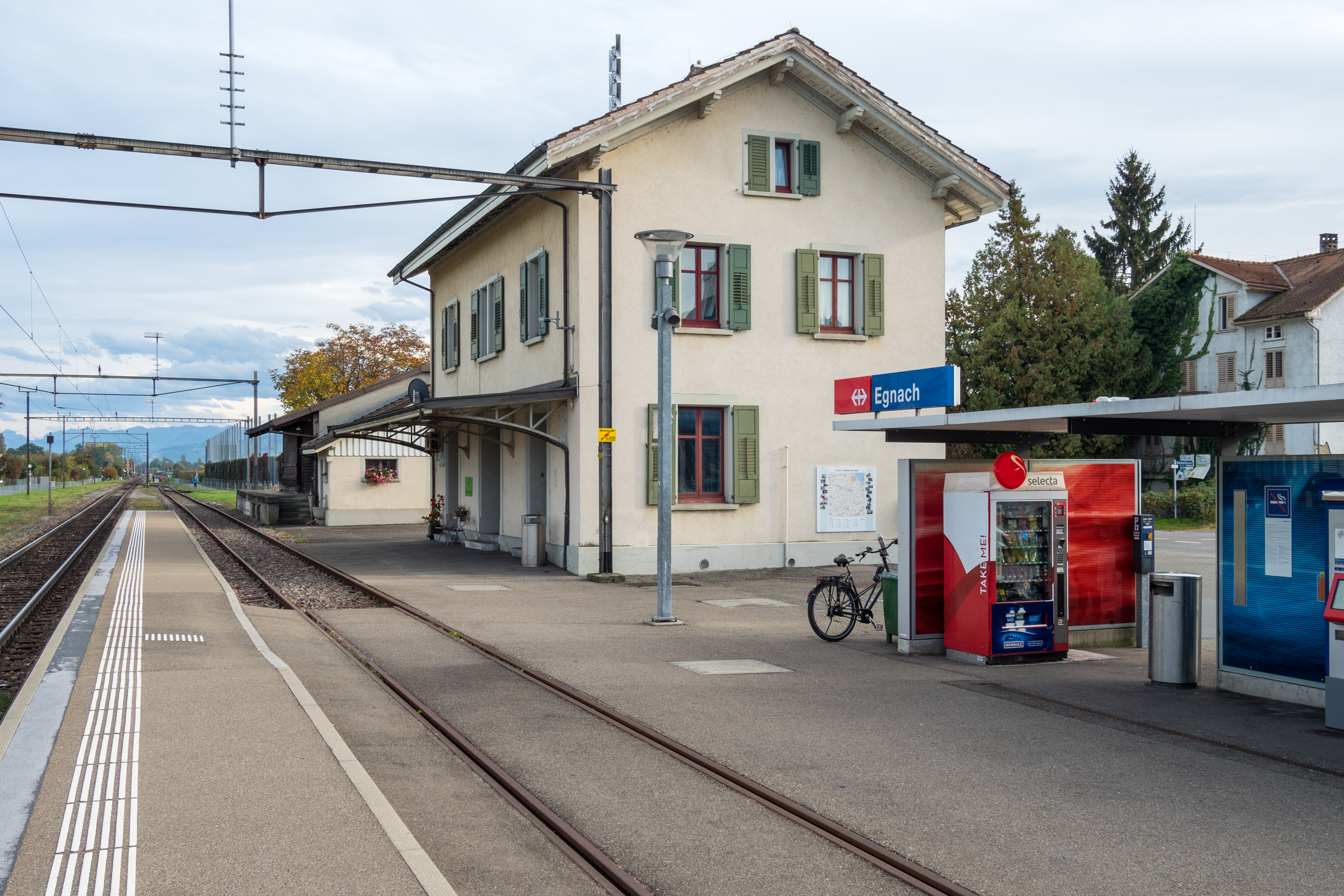
- The station building in 2019

General information
- Location: Egnach; Switzerland
- Coordinates: 47°32′N 9°23′E
- Elevation: 401 m (1,316 ft)
- Owner: Swiss Federal Railways
- Line: Lake line
- Distance: 84.7 km (52.6 mi) from Zürich Hauptbahnhof
- Platforms: 1 side platform
- Tracks: 1
- Train operators: THURBO
- Connections: Autokurse Oberthurgau buses

Other information
- Fare zone: 230 (Tarifverbund Ostwind)

Services
Preceding station	St. Gallen S-Bahn	Following station
Romanshorn towards Weinfelden	S7	Arbon Seemoosriet towards Lindau-Insel
Location
- Location within Switzerland Location within Canton of Thurgau

Egnach railway station (German: Bahnhof Egnach) is a railway station in Egnach, in the Swiss canton of Thurgau. It is located on the Lake line of Swiss Federal Railways. The station is approximately 800 metres (2,600 ft) from the Neukirch-Egnach station on the Bodensee–Toggenburg line.

== Services ==
As of the December 2021 timetable change, the following services stop at Egnach:

- St. Gallen S-Bahn S7: half-hourly service between Rorschach and Romanshorn and hourly service to Weinfelden; on Saturdays and Sundays, service every two hours from Rorschach to Lindau-Reutin via Bregenz.
