= Massimo Borgobello =

Italian footballer

Personal information
- Full name: Massimo Borgobello
- Date of birth: 17 May 1971 (age 55)
- Place of birth: Sacile, Italy
- Height: 1.79 m (5 ft 10 in)
- Position: Forward

Team information
- Current team: Cisco Roma

Senior career*
Years	Team	Apps	(Gls)
1988–91	Conegliano Calcio	55	(18)
1991–93	Caerano	63	(19)
1993–94	Giorgione	33	(14)
1994–96	Novara	53	(19)
1996	Chievo	2	(0)
1996–97	Ischia	24	(4)
1997–98	Brescello	7	(1)
1997–04	Ternana	189	(73)
1999	→ Venezia (loan)	6	(0)
2004	Salernitana	8	(0)
2005	Venezia	9	(0)
2006	Triestina	16	(5)
2006–07	Monza	18	(0)
2007–08	Cisco Roma	14	(2)
2008–09	Viterbese	0	(0)
- * Club domestic league appearances and goals

Massimo Borgobello (born 17 May 1971) is a retired Italian footballer. He played as a forward.

He played 6 games in the Serie A in the 1999/00 season for Venezia FC. In July 2005, he was banned for 5 months due to Caso Genoa.

He was the 3rd best scorer of the Serie B in the 2002/03 season with 18 goals.
