= Arbon =

Place in Thurgau, Switzerland

- Municipality
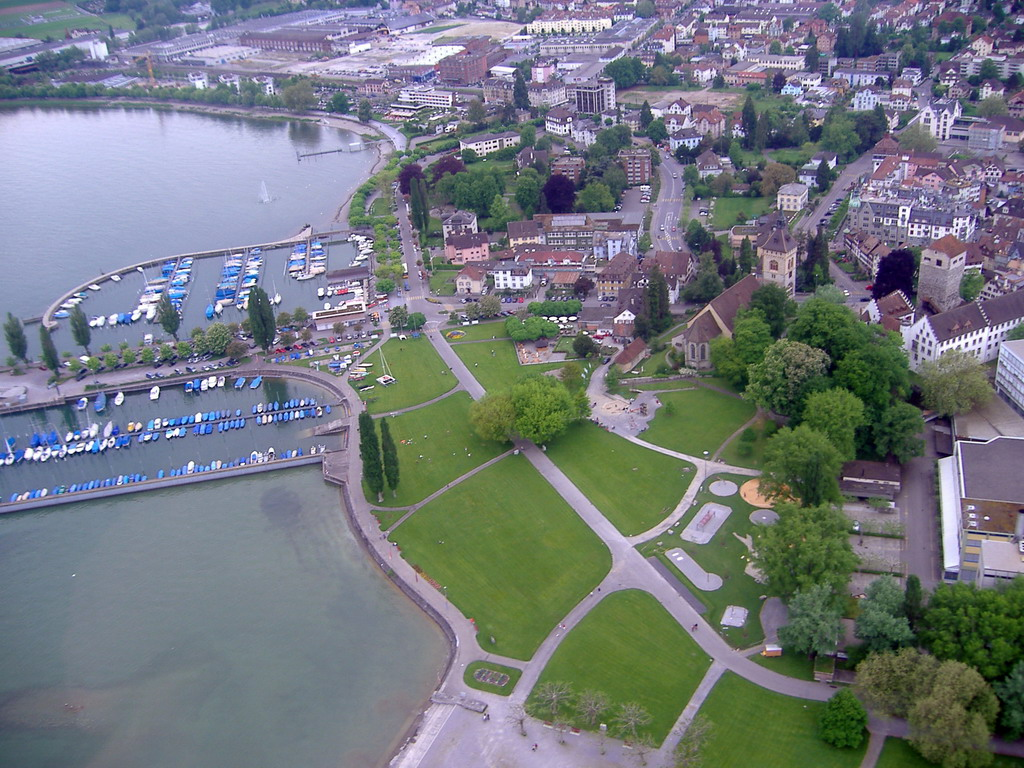

- Coat of arms
- Location of Arbon
- Location within Switzerland Location within Canton of Thurgau
- Coordinates: 47°31′N 9°26′E
- Country: Switzerland
- Canton: Thurgau
- District: Arbon

Government
  - Executive: Stadtrat with 5 members
  - Mayor: Stadtammann/Stadtpräsident (list); Andreas Balg FDP/PRD (as of March 2015)
  - Parliament: Stadtparlament with 30 members

Area
  - Total: 6.00 km^{2} (2.32 sq mi)
- Elevation (Galluskapelle): 399 m (1,309 ft)

Population (December 2020)
  - Total: 14,950
  - Density: 2,490/km^{2} (6,450/sq mi)
- Demonym: German: Arboner(in)
- Time zone: UTC+01:00 (CET)
  - Summer (DST): UTC+02:00 (CEST)
- Postal codes: 9320 Arbon, 9320 Frasnacht, 9320 Stachen
- SFOS number: 4401
- ISO 3166 code: CH-TG
- Localities: Arbon, Frasnacht, Stachen, Schloss, Bergli, Neusätz, Chratzere, Speiserslehn, Scheidweg, Steineloh
- Surrounded by: Egnach, Roggwil TG, Berg SG, Steinach, Horn
- Twin towns: Langenargen (Germany), Binn (Switzerland)
- Website: www.arbon.ch

Arbon is a historic town and a municipality and district capital of the district of Arbon in the canton of Thurgau in Switzerland.

Arbon is located on the southern shore of Lake Constance, on a railway line between Konstanz/Romanshorn and Rorschach/Chur, or St. Gallen, respectively.

It is the site of prehistoric settlements reaching back 6500 years. Elements of the castle on the peninsula were part of a Late Roman defensive fortification that developed into a medieval town in the first half of the thirteenth century.

== Geography ==
Arbon is situated on a peninsula on the southwest shore of Lake Constance between Romanshorn and Rorschach. On the south, the municipality borders the canton of St. Gallen. St. Gallen is the nearest larger city.

The surrounding hills are remaining moraines of the Rhine glacier that existed in prehistoric times.

The surrounding municipalities are (counter-clockwise from the north): Egnach, Roggwil, Berg, Steinach, and Horn. Lake Constance forms the municipality boundary on the northeast and east.

Arbon has an area, as of 2009, of 5.94 square kilometers (2.29 sq mi). Of this area, 2.23 km^{2} (0.86 sq mi) or 37.5% is used for agricultural purposes, while 0.32 km^{2} (0.12 sq mi) or 5.4% is forested. Of the rest of the land, 3.31 km^{2} (1.28 sq mi) or 55.7% is settled (buildings or roads), 0.04 km^{2} (9.9 acres) or 0.7% is either rivers or lakes and 0.03 km^{2} (7.4 acres) or 0.5% is unproductive land.

Of the built up area, industrial buildings made up 27.8% of the total area while housing and buildings made up 9.9% and transportation infrastructure made up 1.5%. Power and water infrastructure as well as other special developed areas made up 5.4% of the area while parks, green belts and sports fields made up 11.1%. Out of the forested land, 2.4% of the total land area is heavily forested and 3.0% is covered with orchards or small clusters of trees. Of the agricultural land, 29.3% is used for growing crops, while 8.2% is used for orchards or vine crops.

Although Arbon has an area of only 5.9 km^{2}, it is divided into six neighborhoods. The Altstadt is in the center and has the typical medieval buildings and narrow streets. Efforts have been made in recent years to reduce automobile traffic in the center. Bergli is named after the hill on which it lies. The southern part of Arbon started as a working-class neighborhood during industrialization. It includes the neighborhoods of Neustadt, Bleiche, and Stacherholz. This industrial area has a limit placed on new development.

Stachen and Frasnacht are independent parts of the municipality that were incorporated in 1998. Stachen and Arbon have grown together, but there is still a rural stretch between Frasnacht and the other two.

=== Climate ===
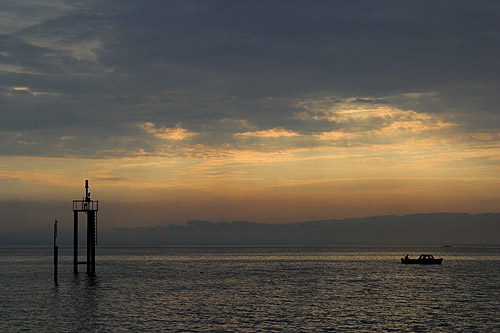
Lake Constance

Lake Constance assures that the climate in Arbon is mild, both summer and winter.

The warm winds from the west bring heavy rainfall as they meet the dry, cold, continental winds from the northeast. The warm Föhn that comes over the Alps from the south is felt as far as Arbon.

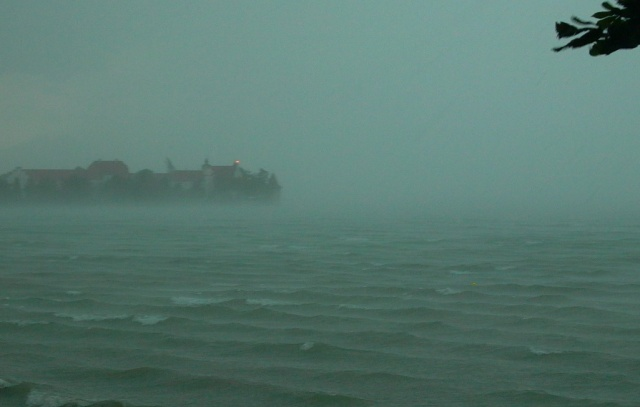
Storm on Lake Constance

In the summer, warm electrical storms are common. Arbon has a storm warning system for boats on Lake Constance and works closely with neighboring towns.

Average January temperatures lie between −2 and 0 °C (28 and 32 °F). Average July temperatures range from 15 to 18 °C (59 to 64 °F). Average annual precipitation is between 80 and 100 cm.

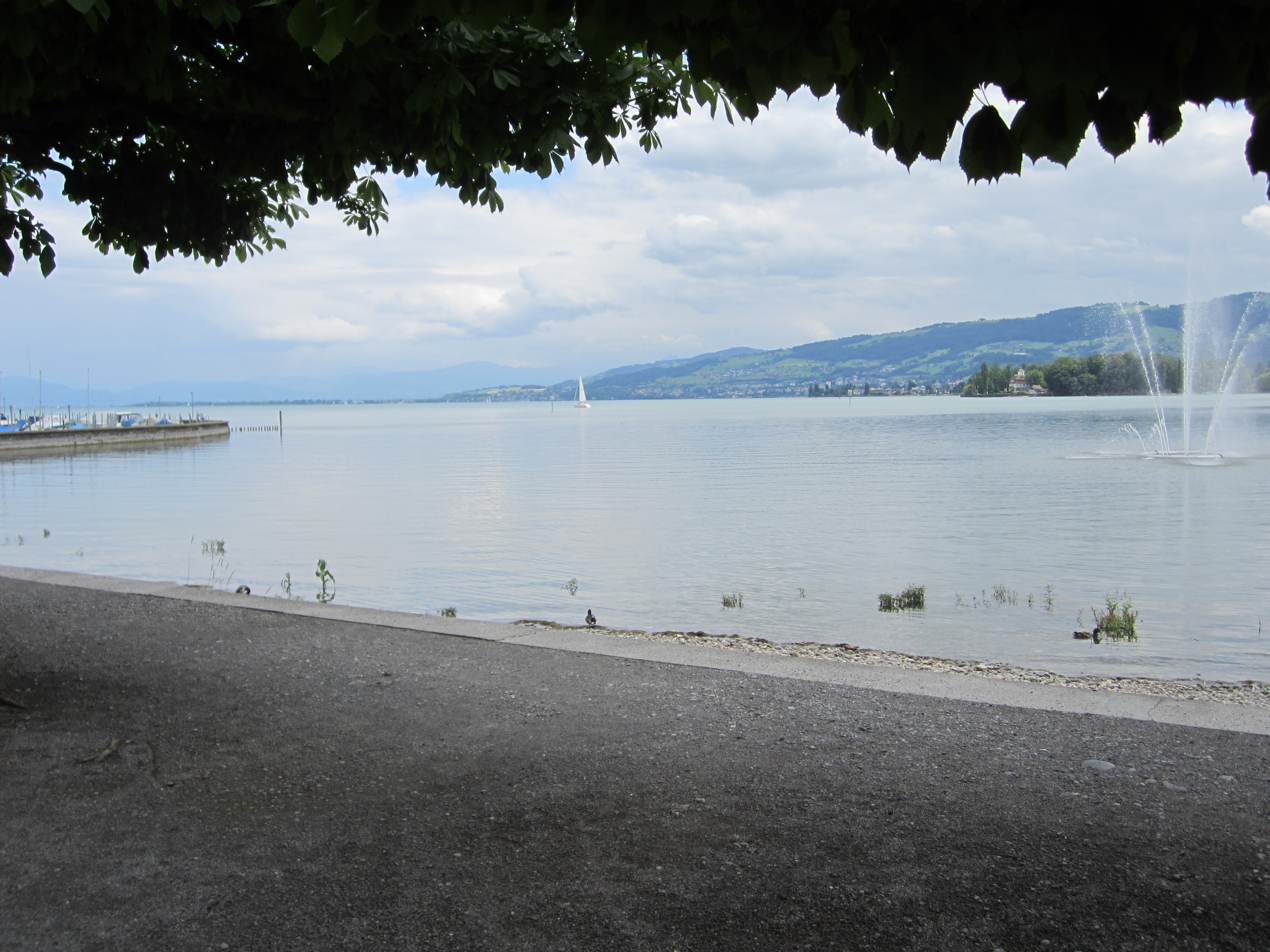
View from Arbon to the Lake of Constance

The prevailing winds make Lake Constance a favorite for sailing and wind surfing.

In the winter, ponds and the lake slowly freeze. In 1963, Lake Constance froze over, something that only happens about every 100 years.

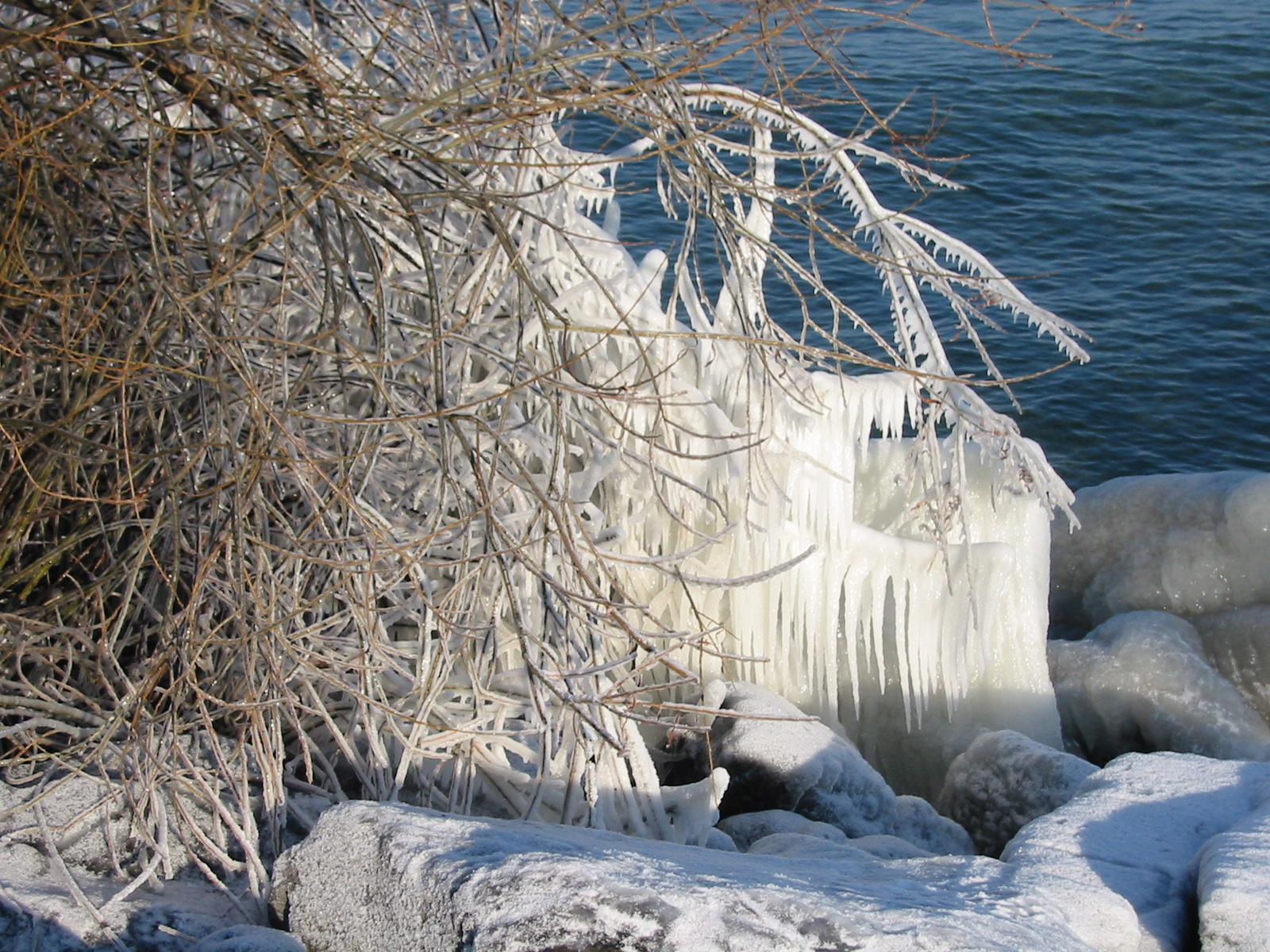
The big freeze

== History ==
The shores of Lake Constance near Arbon have been inhabited since the Stone Age. Archaeological digs in 1885 and 1944 have uncovered stilt houses from the Stone and Bronze Ages. At first, it was assumed that these were built over water, since they were raised on stilts. However, it is now known that they were on the shore and were built in this fashion because the ground was swampy.

During Roman times, Bergli was probably a Roman fort. The raised situation and view over the lake were strategically important. Since 1957, regular excavations have shown the remains of late Roman fortifications. The Latin name of Arbon, Arbor Felix (meaning happy tree), first appears in around 280 and is mentioned in the Itinerarium Antonini in 300.

According to the chronicles of Ammianus Marcellinus, the emperor Gratian passed by Arbon in 378 as he hurried to join his uncle Valens, who was marching to confront the Goths at Battle of Adrianople.

Aerial view from 250 m by Walter Mittelholzer (1925)

In the 8th century, the area became part of the territory of the Franks.

In 610, Irish monks who were followers of Columban of Luxeuil settled in Arbon. They found a small Christian settlement called Castrum there. One of these monks was St. Gallus, the founder of the monastery of St. Gallen. He died in 627 in Arbon. In 720, a fortification on the site of the present castle was built by a Frankish troop. The foundations of this early fortress remain. The first written mention of Arbon is in "Itinerarium Antonini" of 771 where it is mentioned as in pago Arbonense.

Arbon, along with most of the southern shore of Lake Constance belonged to Prince-Bishopric of Constance. In 1255, Bishop Eberhard von Waldburg gave Arbon a dispensation for market rights in the area and built the city wall. That century saw an influx of inhabitants from the surrounding farms. From 1262 to 1264, and again in 1266, the young duke of Swabia, Conradin of Hohenstaufen, resided in Arbon because the Bishop of Constance was his guardian. The surrounding towns of Steinach, Mörschwil, Horn, Goldach, Egnach, Roggwil, and Steinebrunn all belonged to the parish of Arbon.

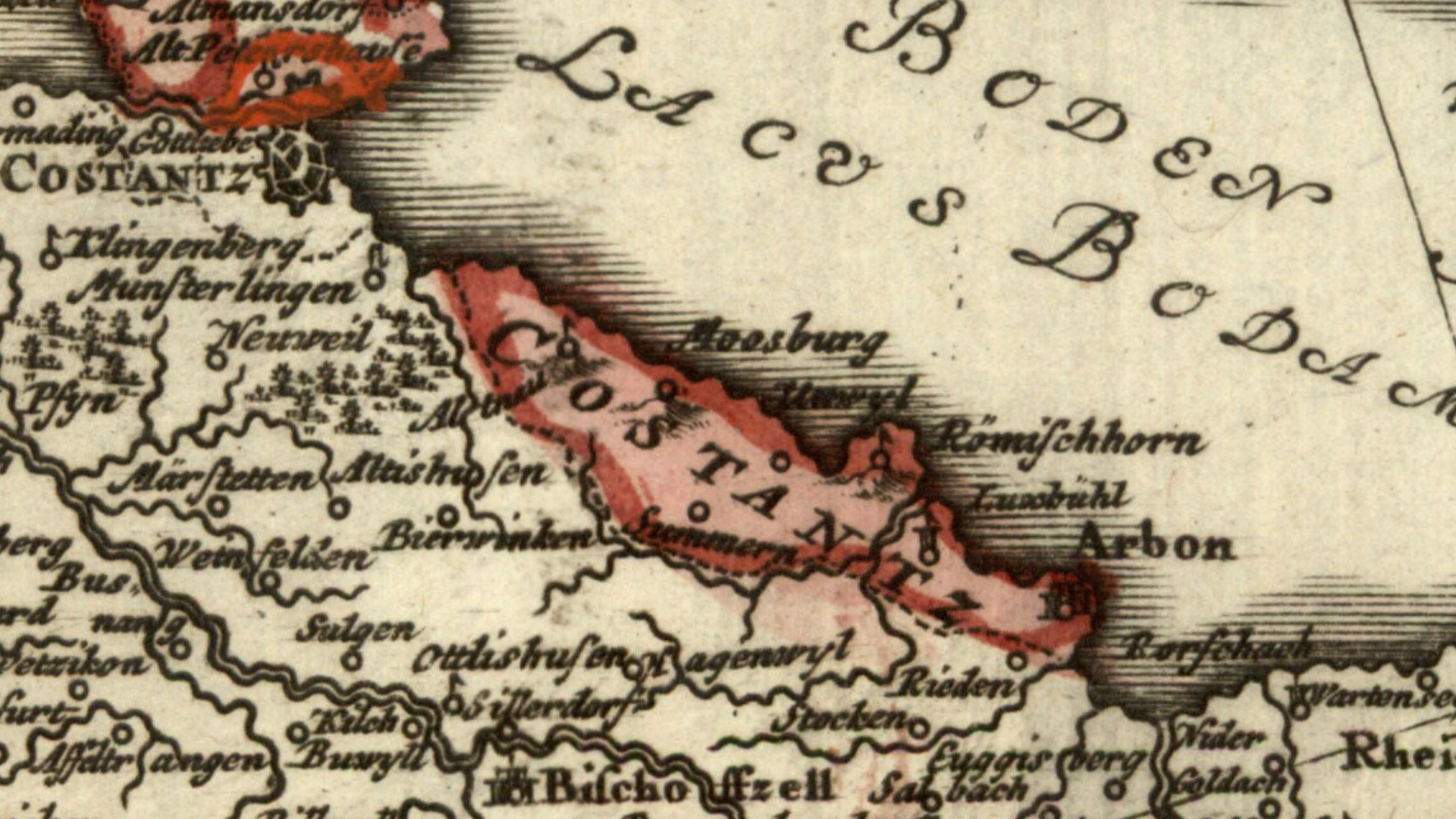
18th century map showing Arbon as part of the Prince-Bishopric of Constance

The 14th century saw further growth. Linen production and other crafts developed. Between 1322 and 1334, Bishop Rudolf von Montfort rebuilt the crumbling fortress. A fire of unknown cause in 1390 destroyed much of the Altstadt. A second fire in 1494 was set by the sons of a hanged thief.

When Thurgau was conquered by the Swiss Eidgenossen in 1460, the Bishops of Constance retained Arbon. However, in the Swabian War of 1499, they lost civil rights over the territory, retaining only ecclesiastical supremacy. Arbon then became part of the Old Swiss Confederacy.

The castle of Arbon in its present form was built in 1515 by Bishop Hugo von Hohenlandenberg. The tower is older and dates to 993.

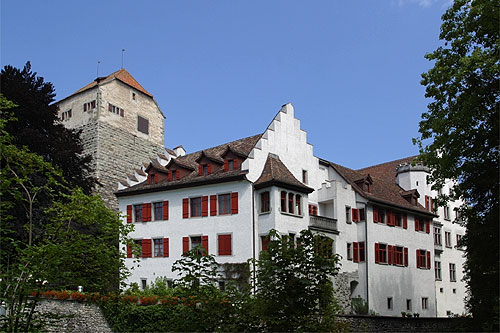
Castle of Arbon

In 1525, the first stirrings of the Reformation reached Arbon. In 1537, the reformed congregation was forced to return the church of St. Martin to the Catholic Church and meet in the chapel in Erdhausen, although only a small minority of the population remained Catholic. Religious conflict continued until the 18th century. In 1712, Thurgau declared equality for the various faiths.

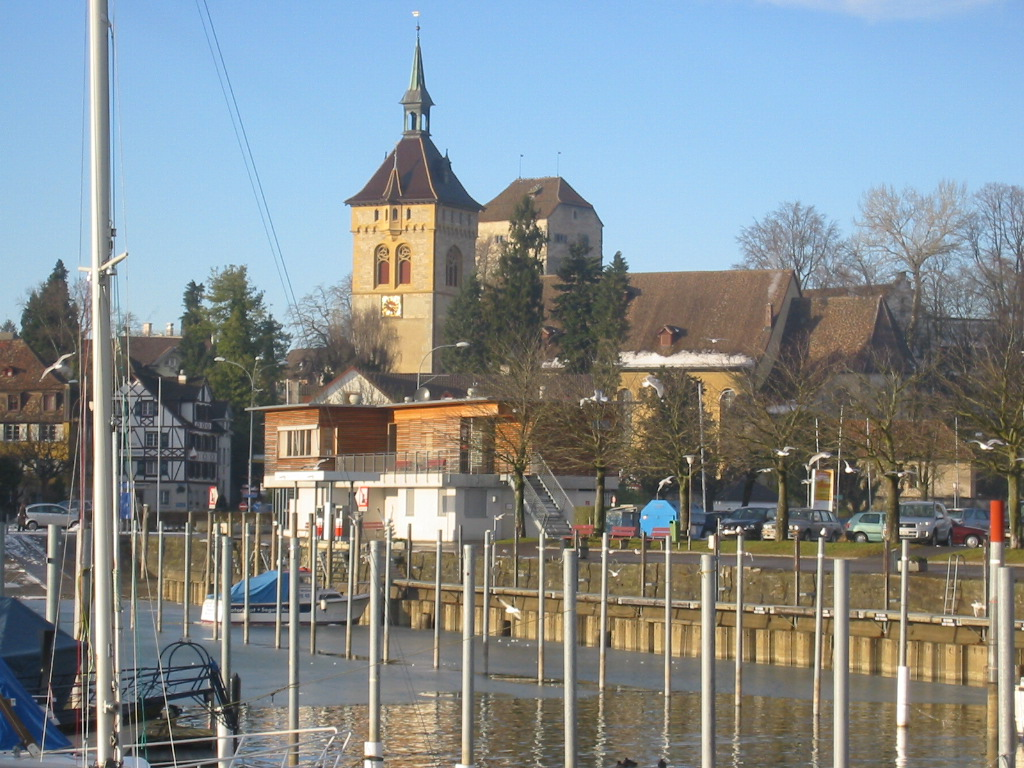
St. Martin Church and the harbor

In the 18th century, the linen and embroidery industry was established in Arbon. The industrialists built attractive villas in the area, such as the «Rotes Haus» built in 1750.

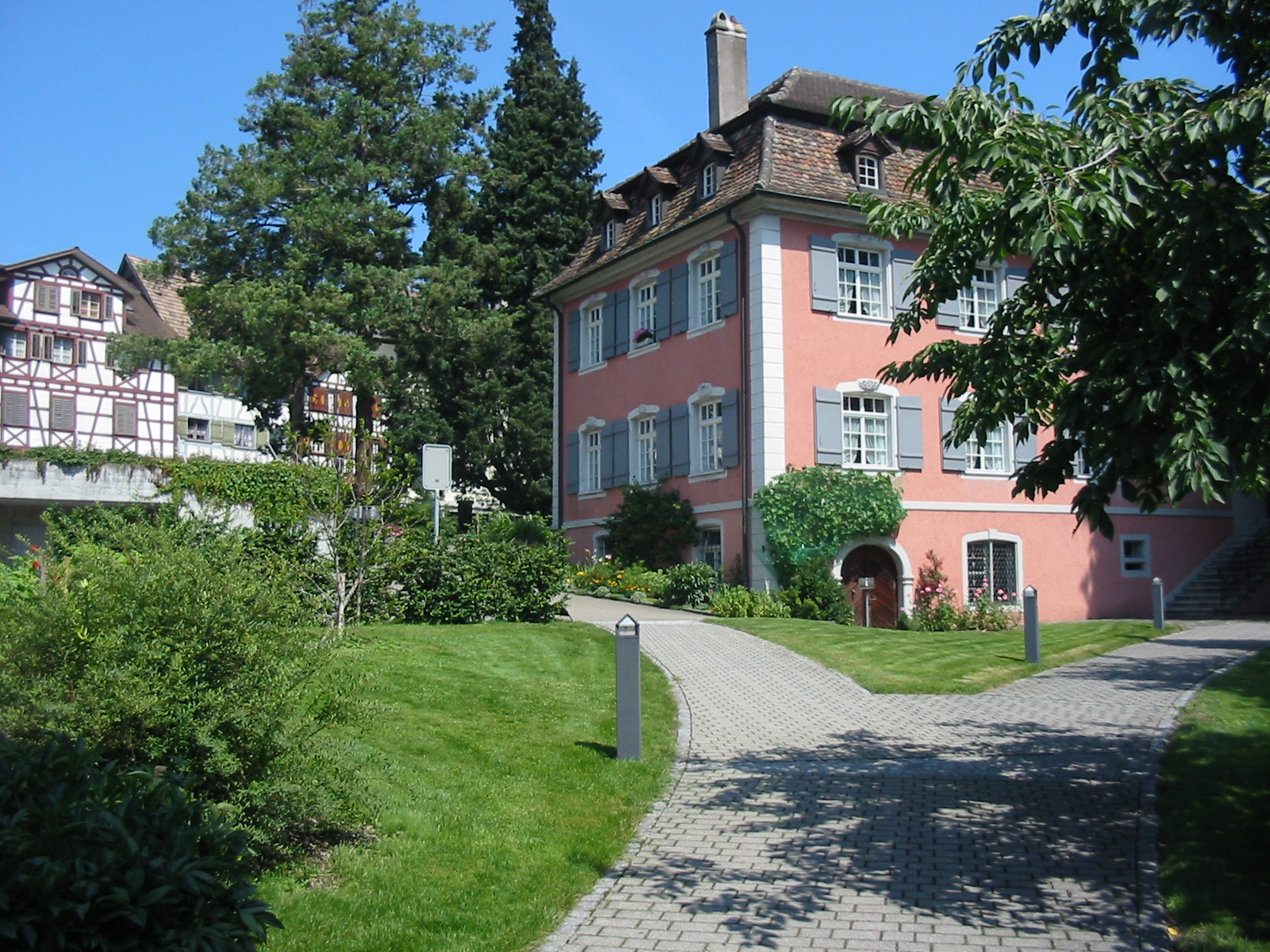
Rotes Haus built in 1750

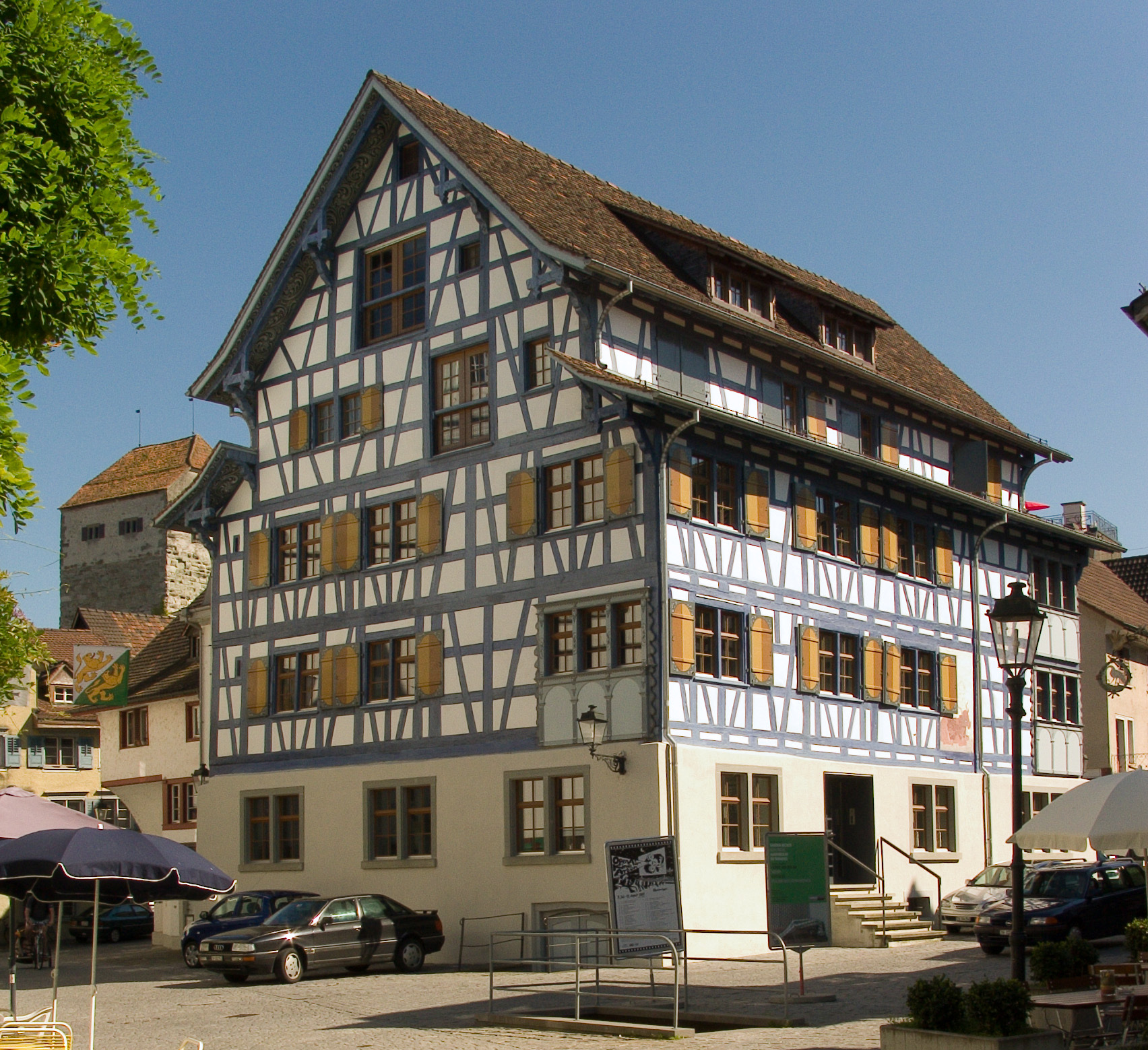
"Ochsen" built in 1718

In 1798, Thurgau was occupied by French troops, along with much of the rest of Switzerland. The adoption of the Swiss constitution ended Arbon's dependence on the Bishops of Constance. The Bishop's representative, Franz Xaver Wirz von Rudenz, was forced to leave the city. In 1803, Arbon became part of the new canton of Thurgau. From 1803 to 1815, Arbon and Horn (an exclave in the canton of St. Gallen) were united in one municipality.

In the 19th century, Arbon developed into an economic and manufacturing center. This occurred primarily because of the pioneering efforts of industrialist Franz Saurer, who moved his foundry from St. Gallen to Arbon in 1863. Starting in 1888, his factory built all kinds of machinery and motors. Until 1983, the Adolph Saurer AG factory produced trucks and buses, and until 1986 military vehicles. Today, the factory produces only textile machinery. At its high point, the factory employed 5000 workers. The population grew from 660 in 1844 to over 10,000 at the turn of the century.

Since the beginning of the 20th century, Arbon has had a large non-Swiss minority. Tensions between ethnic groups led to riots with several fatalities in 1902.

In 1911, Arbon was the site of the International Socialist Congress. From the 1920s to the 1950s, the Social Democratic majority held power in the city, and it was known as red Arbon.

== Population ==
Between 1860 and 1910, the population grew extensively because of industrialization. Arbon became the biggest city in the canton of Thurgau. During World War II, the population shrank due to the proximity of Germany (just across Lake Constance) and flight from the frontiers. However, after the war, the population returned.

Today, because of the addition of Frasnacht, Stachen, Kratzern, Speiserlehn, and Fetzisloh, the population is 14,950 as of December 2020. As of 2008, 28.9% of the population are foreign nationals. Over the last 10 years (1997–2007) the population has changed at a rate of 0.7%. As of 2000, most of the population speaks German (84.5%), with Italian being second most common (4.0%) and Serbo-Croatian being third (2.9%). Arbon is now the third-largest city in the canton, after Frauenfeld and Kreuzlingen.

The historical population is given in the following table:

year	population (Municipality)	population (Bürgergemeinde)
1824		645
1850	927	
1870	1,919	1,396
1888	3,073	2,500
1910	10,299	9,598
1941	8,570	7,897
1970	13,122	12,227
1990	12,415	11,043

=== Religion ===
Like many places in the canton of Thurgau, Arbon is divided between Lutheran/Reformed and Catholic. St. Martin is Catholic, as is the nearby Gallus Chapel. Bergli has a Lutheran church, and Freikirchen a Methodist one. Recently, there has been an influx of Moslems from the Balkans, particularly from Kosovo.

From the 2000 census, 5,090 or 39.4% were Roman Catholic, while 4,176 or 32.4% belonged to the Swiss Reformed Church. Of the rest of the population, there were 8 Old Catholics (or about 0.06% of the population) who belonged to the Christian Catholic Church of Switzerland there are 371 individuals (or about 2.87% of the population) who belong to the Orthodox Church, and there are 449 individuals (or about 3.48% of the population) who belong to another Christian church. There was 1 individual who was Jewish, and 1,167 (or about 9.04% of the population) who are Islamic. There are 104 individuals (or about 0.81% of the population) who belong to another church (not listed on the census), 941 (or about 7.29% of the population) belong to no church, are agnostic or atheist, and 599 individuals (or about 4.64% of the population) did not answer the question.

== Demographics ==
As of 2008, the gender distribution of the population was 49.6% male and 50.4% female. The population was made up of 4,572 Swiss men (34.1% of the population), and 2,091 (15.6%) non-Swiss men. There were 4,977 Swiss women (37.1%), and 1,787 (13.3%) non-Swiss women.

In 2008 there were 74 live births to Swiss citizens and 33 births to non-Swiss citizens, and in same time span there were 131 deaths of Swiss citizens and 10 non-Swiss citizen deaths. Ignoring immigration and emigration, the population of Swiss citizens decreased by 57 while the foreign population increased by 23. There was 1 Swiss man, 2 Swiss women who emigrated from Switzerland to another country, 128 non-Swiss men who emigrated from Switzerland to another country and 95 non-Swiss women who emigrated from Switzerland to another country. The total Swiss population change in 2008 (from all sources) was an increase of 16 and the non-Swiss population change was an increase of 170 people. This represents a population growth rate of 1.4%.

The age distribution, as of 2009, in Arbon is; 1,215 children or 9.0% of the population are between 0 and 9 years old and 1,501 teenagers or 11.2% are between 10 and 19. Of the adult population, 1,783 people or 13.3% of the population are between 20 and 29 years old. 1,708 people or 12.7% are between 30 and 39, 2,224 people or 16.6% are between 40 and 49, and 1,690 people or 12.6% are between 50 and 59. The senior population distribution is 1,476 people or 11.0% of the population are between 60 and 69 years old, 1,080 people or 8.0% are between 70 and 79, there are 625 people or 4.7% who are between 80 and 89, and there are 128 people or 1.0% who are 90 and older.

As of 2000 the average number of residents per living room was 0.57 which is about equal to the cantonal average of 0.56 per room. In this case, a room is defined as space of a housing unit of at least 4 m^{2} (43 sq ft) as normal bedrooms, dining rooms, living rooms, kitchens and habitable cellars and attics.

About 26% of the total households were owner occupied, or in other words did not pay rent (though they may have a mortgage or a rent-to-own agreement). As of 2000, there were 5,678 private households in the municipality, and an average of 2.2 persons per household. In 2000 there were 931 single family homes (or 56.6% of the total) out of a total of 1,646 inhabited buildings. There were 135 two family buildings (8.2%), 147 three family buildings (8.9%) and 433 multi-family buildings (or 26.3%). There were 3,250 (or 25.2%) persons who were part of a couple without children, and 6,146 (or 47.6%) who were part of a couple with children. There were 857 (or 6.6%) people who lived in single parent home, while there are 87 persons who were adult children living with one or both parents, 61 persons who lived in a household made up of relatives, 92 who lived in a household made up of unrelated persons, and 351 who are either institutionalized or live in another type of collective housing.

The vacancy rate for the municipality, in 2008, was 1.73%. As of 2007, the construction rate of new housing units was 1.3 new units per 1000 residents. In 2000 there were 6,400 apartments in the municipality. The most common apartment size was the 4 room apartment of which there were 2,164. There were 267 single room apartments and 485 apartments with six or more rooms. As of 2000 the average price to rent an average apartment in Arbon was 979.90 Swiss francs (CHF) per month (US$780, £440, €630 approx. exchange rate from 2000). The average rate for a one-room apartment was 490.98 CHF (US$390, £220, €310), a two-room apartment was about 729.51 CHF (US$580, £330, €470), a three-room apartment was about 897.10 CHF (US$720, £400, €570) and a six or more room apartment cost an average of 1453.57 CHF (US$1160, £650, €930). The average apartment price in Arbon was 87.8% of the national average of 1116 CHF.

== Education ==
The entire Swiss population is generally well educated. In Arbon about 76.1% of the population (between age 25 and 64) have completed either non-mandatory upper secondary education or additional higher education (either university or a Fachhochschule).

Arbon is home to the Arbon primary school district. It is also home to the Arbon secondary school district. In the 2008/2009 school year there are 884 students in the primary school district. There are 203 children in the kindergarten, and the average class size is 18.45 kindergartners. Of the children in kindergarten, 89 or 43.8% are female, 83 or 40.9% are not Swiss citizens and 16 or 7.9% do not speak German natively. The lower and upper primary levels begin at about age 5-6 and lasts for 6 years. There are 356 children in who are at the lower primary level and 325 children in the upper primary level. The average class size in the primary school is 21.17 students. At the lower primary level, there are 167 children or 46.9% of the total population who are female, 146 or 41.0% are not Swiss citizens and 4 or 1.1% do not speak German natively. In the upper primary level, there are 148 or 45.5% who are female, 126 or 38.8% are not Swiss citizens and 3 or 0.9% do not speak German natively.

In the secondary school district there are 585 students. At the secondary level, students are divided according to performance. The secondary level begins at about age 12 and usually lasts 3 years. There are 299 teenagers who are in the advanced school, of which 154 or 51.5% are female, 45 or 15.1% are not Swiss citizens and 8 or 2.7% do not speak German natively. There are 262 teenagers who are in the standard school, of which 124 or 47.3% are female, 112 or 42.7% are not Swiss citizens and 21 or 8.0% do not speak German natively. Finally, there are 24 teenagers who are in special or remedial classes, of which 11 or 45.8% are female, 11 or 45.8% are not Swiss citizens and 4 or 16.7% do not speak German natively. The average class size for all classes at the secondary level is 20.04 students.

Arbon is home to the Stadtbibliothek Arbon library. The library has (as of 2008) 1,026 books or other media, and loaned out 56,588 items in the same year. It was open a total of 250 days with average of 14.5 hours per week during that year.

== Economy ==
As of 2007, Arbon had an unemployment rate of 2.97%. As of 2005, there were 75 people employed in the primary economic sector and about 19 businesses involved in this sector. 2,458 people are employed in the secondary sector and there are 127 businesses in this sector. 3,026 people are employed in the tertiary sector, with 480 businesses in this sector. In 2000 there were 8,320 workers who lived in the municipality. Of these, 3,313 or about 39.8% of the residents worked outside Arbon while 3,266 people commuted into the municipality for work. There were a total of 8,273 jobs (of at least 6 hours per week) in the municipality. Of the working population, 11.8% used public transportation to get to work, and 48% used a private car.

== Government ==
The Stadtparlament of Arbon for the mandate period of 2015–2019
1. SP (26.7%)
2. EVP (6.70%)
3. CVP (20.0%)
4. FDP (23.3%)
5. SVP (20.0%)
6. XMV (3.30%)

In addition to the Town Council (German: Stadtrat) of five members (Stadtrat/Stadträtin), Arbon has a 30-member city parliament (Stadtparlament). The mayor of the (Stadtpräsident/Stadtammann) of the mandate period (Legislatur) 2015-2019 is Andreas Balg (FDP).

The last election of the Town Parliament was held on 8 March 2015 for the mandate period of 2015–2019. Currently the Town Parliament consist of 8 members of the Social Democratic Party (SP), 7 members of The Liberals (FDP), 6 Christian Democratic People's Party (CVP), 6 Swiss People's Party (SVP), 2 Evangelical People's Party (EVP), and 1 member of the Xsunder Menschen Verstand (XMV).

== Transportation ==
Since 1993, Arbon has had an entrance to the A1 motorway. This gives easy access to St. Gallen and Zürich. Before, there was only a curvy cantonal road.

Arbon is also on the Lake Line to Rorschach, Romanshorn, and Kreuzlingen and has two stations: Arbon and Arbon Seemoosriet. Two bus lines serve traffic to Amriswil and St. Gallen.

== Heritage sites of national significance ==
The Bleiche (a prehistoric lake-shore settlement), the Gallus Chapel, the Catholic Church of St Martin, Arbon Castle and Historical Museum and the Late-Roman Fortress are listed as Swiss heritage site of national significance. The entire city of Arbon is an ISOS city, as is the hamlet of Kratzern.

The Bleiche 2-3 sites are prehistoric pile-dwelling (or stilt house) settlements which are part of the Prehistoric Pile dwellings around the Alps UNESCO World Heritage Site.

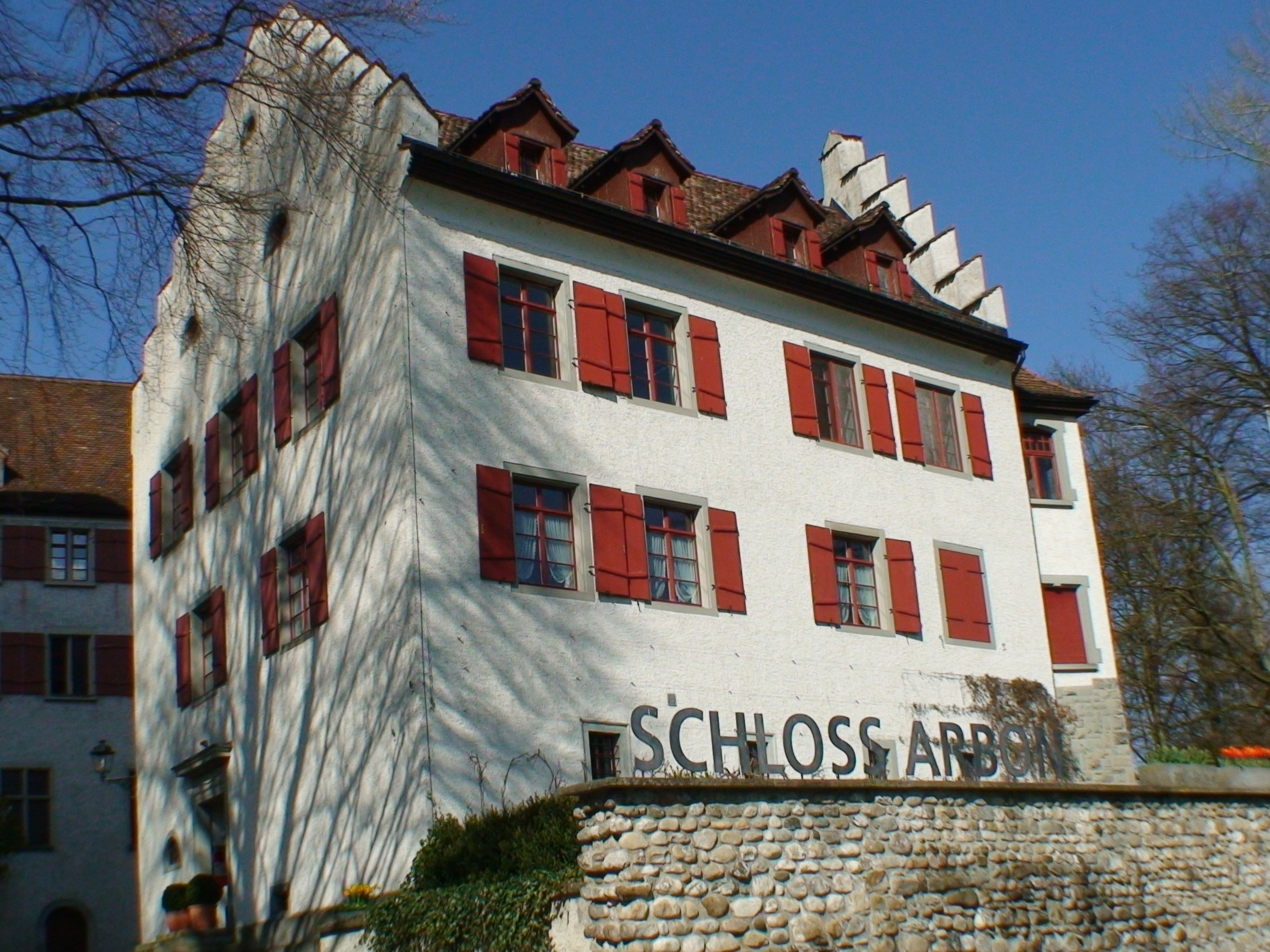
Arbon Castle

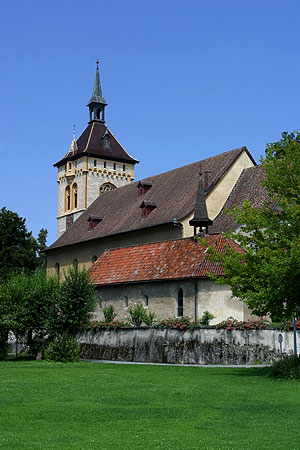
Church of St. Martin

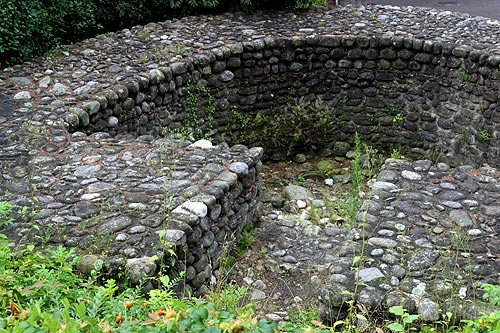
Ruins of the Roman Castle

== Notable residents ==
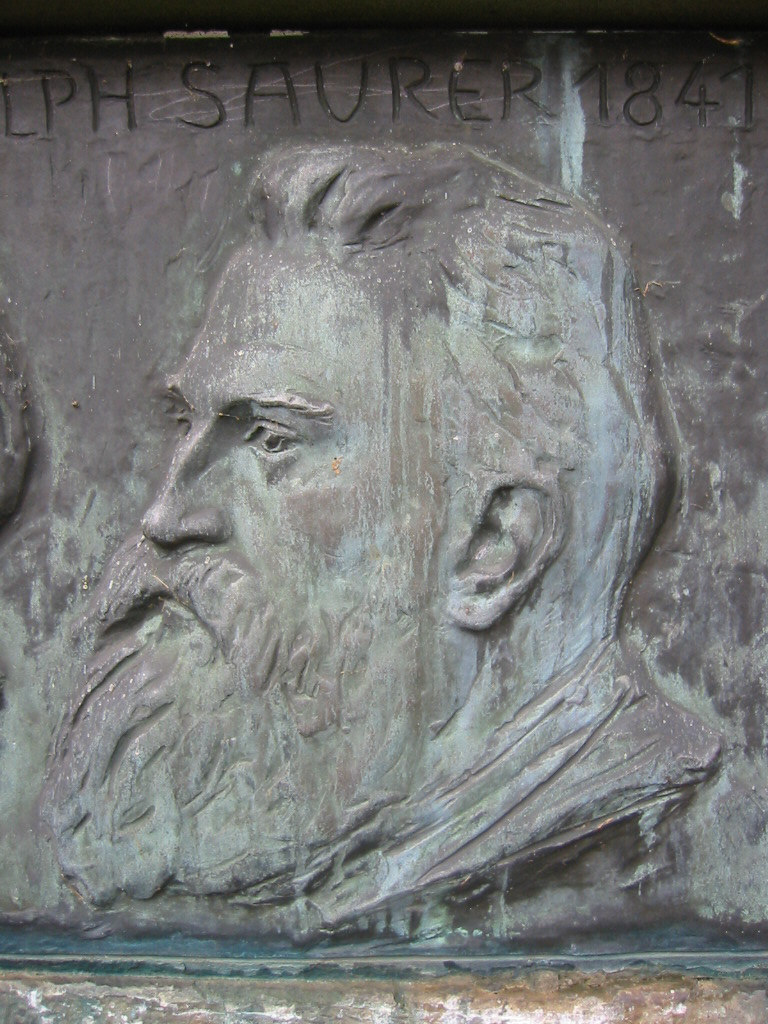
Monument to Adolph Saurer

- Saint Gall (ca.550 – ca. 646 in Arbon), a disciple and one of the traditional twelve companions of Saint Columbanus on his mission from Ireland to the continent
- Jacques Gerschwiler (1898 in Arbon – 2000), a Swiss figure skater and coach
- Saurer family members, manufacturer of trucks and buses in Arbon, 1902–1982
- Arnold Gerschwiler OBE (1914 in Arbon — 2003), a Swiss figure skating coach
- Rolf Järmann (born 1966 in Arbon), a retired road bicycle racer
- Felix Baumgartner (born 1969), an Austrian skydiver, daredevil, and BASE jumper; lives in Arbon
- Marcel Bürge (born 1972 in Arbon), a Swiss rifle shooter, competed at the 2012 Summer Olympics
- Giuseppe Perrone (born 1975 in Arbon), a Swiss footballer, approx. 450 club caps
- Steve Zampieri (born 1977 in Arbon), a Swiss professional road bicycle racer
- Andrea Brühlmann (born 1984 in Arbon), a Swiss sport shooter
- Tunahan Cicek (born 1992 in Arbon), a Swiss professional footballer, approx. 200 club caps
- Ernst Kyburz, Wrestler

== Gallery ==
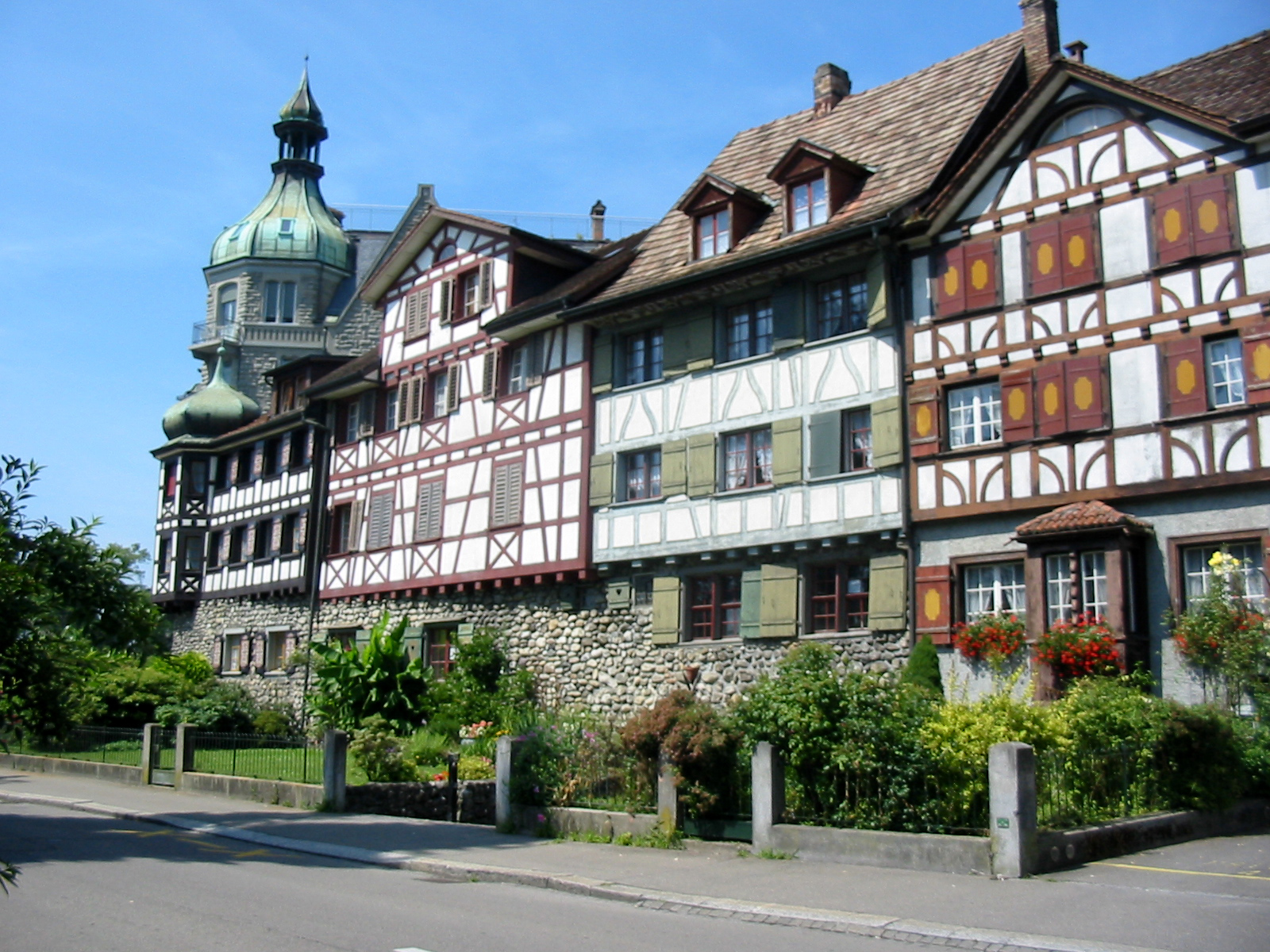

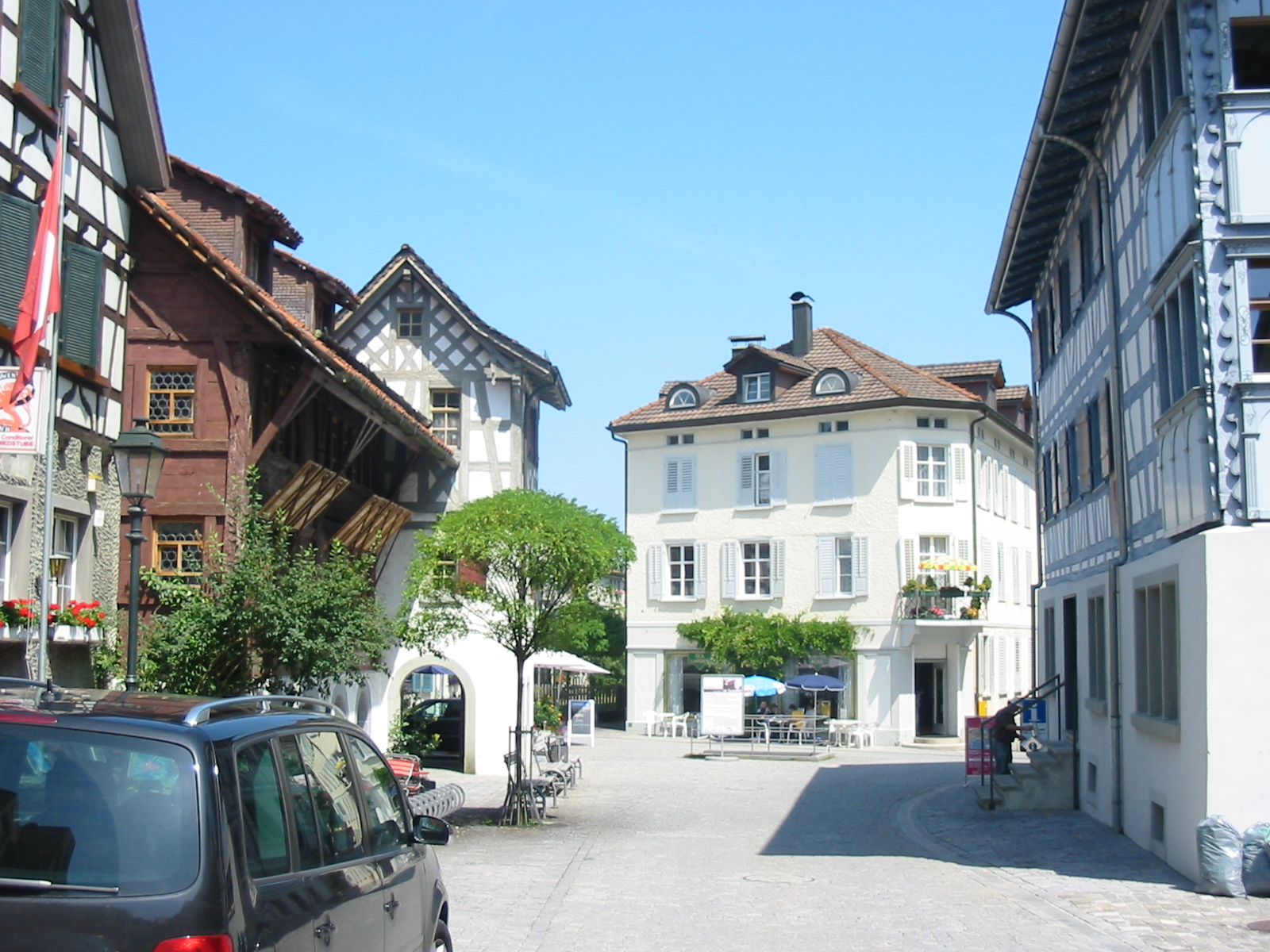

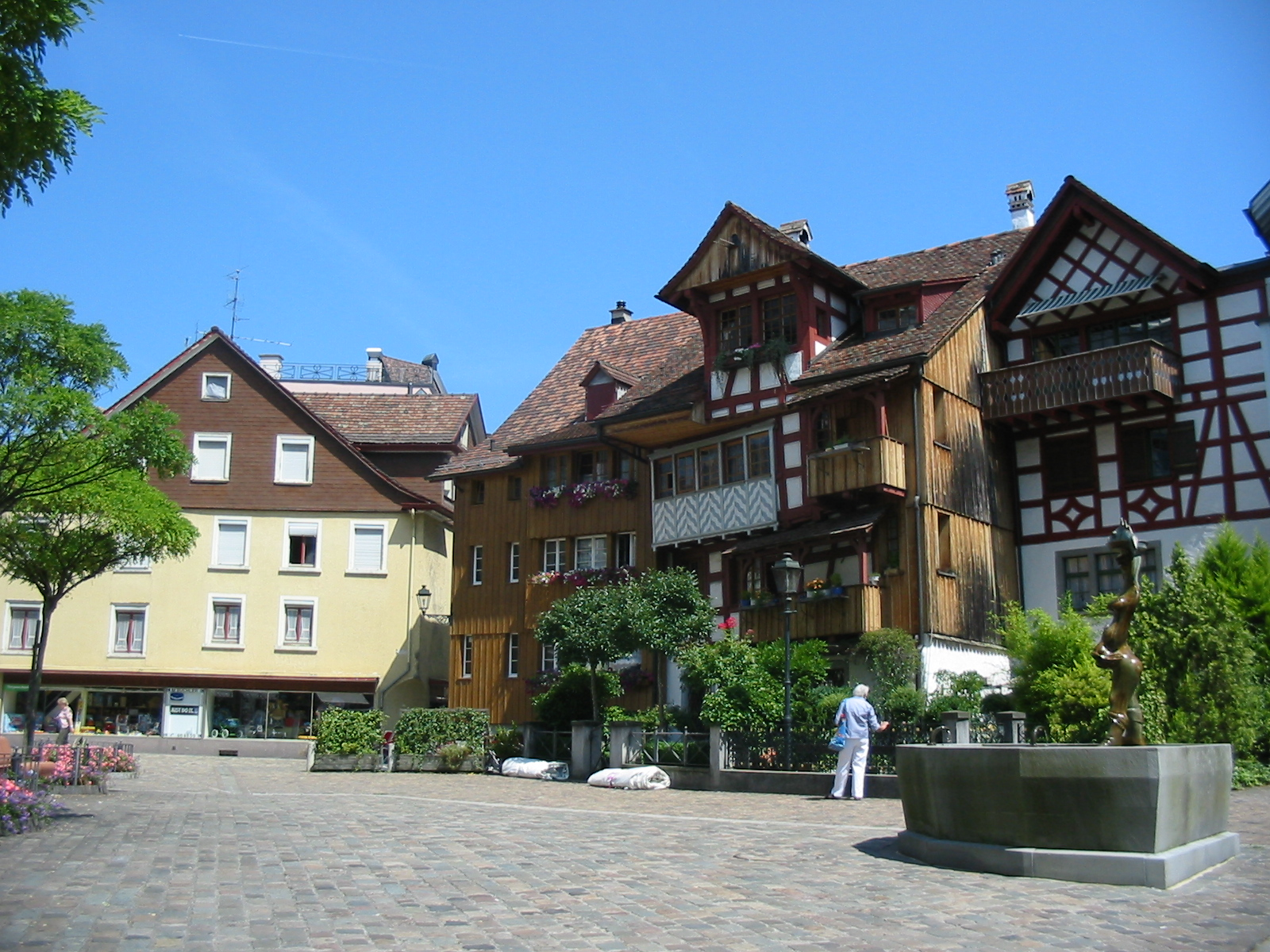
