= Saidu Adeshina =

Nigerian footballer (born 1983)

Personal information
- Full name: Saidu Alade Adeshina
- Date of birth: 4 April 1983 (age 43)
- Place of birth: Lagos, Nigeria
- Height: 1.84 m (6 ft 1/2 in)
- Position: Midfielder

Youth career
- NEPA Lagos

Senior career*
| Years | Team | Apps | (Gls) |
| 1998–2000 | Reggiana | 10 | (0) |
| 2000–2005 | Ternana | 66 | (8) |
| 2005 | → Reggiana (loan) | 16 | (4) |
| 2006 | Arezzo | 5 | (2) |
| 2006–2007 | Bellinzona | 30 | (21) |
| 2007–2011 | Sion | 67 | (10) |
| 2009–2012 | Sion II | 15 | (8) |
| 2010–2011 | → Schaffhausen (loan) | 18 | (1) |
| 2012–2013 | Chiasso | 17 | (2) |
- * Club domestic league appearances and goals

Saidu Alade Adeshina (born 4 April 1983) is a Nigerian former football midfielder.

== Club career ==
On 3 February 2012 Adeshina was signed by Chiasso.
