= Giuseppe Perrone =

Swiss footballer (born 1975)

Personal information
- Full name: Giuseppe Perrone
- Date of birth: 19 May 1975 (age 51)
- Place of birth: Arbon, Swiss
- Position: Forward

Team information
- Current team: Trapani

Senior career*
Years	Team	Apps	(Gls)
1993–1994	Foggia	0	(0)
1994–1995	Bisceglie	27	(0)
1995–1996	Lodigiani	29	(0)
1996–1997	Fermana	28	(6)
1997–1999	Foggia	60	(13)
1999–2000	Ascoli	4	(2)
1999–2000	Foggia	35	(7)
2000–2001	Pistoiese	37	(5)
2001–2002	Cosenza	8	(1)
2002–2003	SPAL	8	(1)
2002–2003	Brindisi	18	(1)
2003–2004	Sangiovannese	27	(5)
2004–2005	Valenzana	13	(6)
2005–2006	Latina	12	(3)
2005–2006	Südtirol	30	(6)
2006–2007	Sansovino	22	(4)
2007–2008	Colligiana	14	(3)
2008–	Trapani	60	(35)
- * Club domestic league appearances and goals as of 6 September 2011

Giuseppe Perrone (born 19 May 1975) is a Swiss footballer, born in Arbon. He currently plays for Trapani Calcio.

== Career ==
Giuseppe Perrone started his career with Foggia in serie A during the 1993-94 season but he did not play any football match and at the end of the season he went playing in a lower league; Serie C2 with the football team Bisceglie.

In the 1997-98 season he returns to Foggia and plays 31 matches in Serie B. In the Following season with Foggia he scores 11 goals in Serie C1.

Perrone plays again in Serie B with Pistoiese in the 2000-01 season and in the 2001-02 season.

For the 2009-10 season he plays in Serie D with Trapani where he scores 20 times; his largest number of goals for one season. In the following season he still plays with Trapani where he scores 14 times which made him as the top scorer of 2010–11 Lega Pro Seconda Divisione and one of the most prolific forward of Trapani Calcio ever.
