= Horn, Switzerland =

Horn
- Municipality
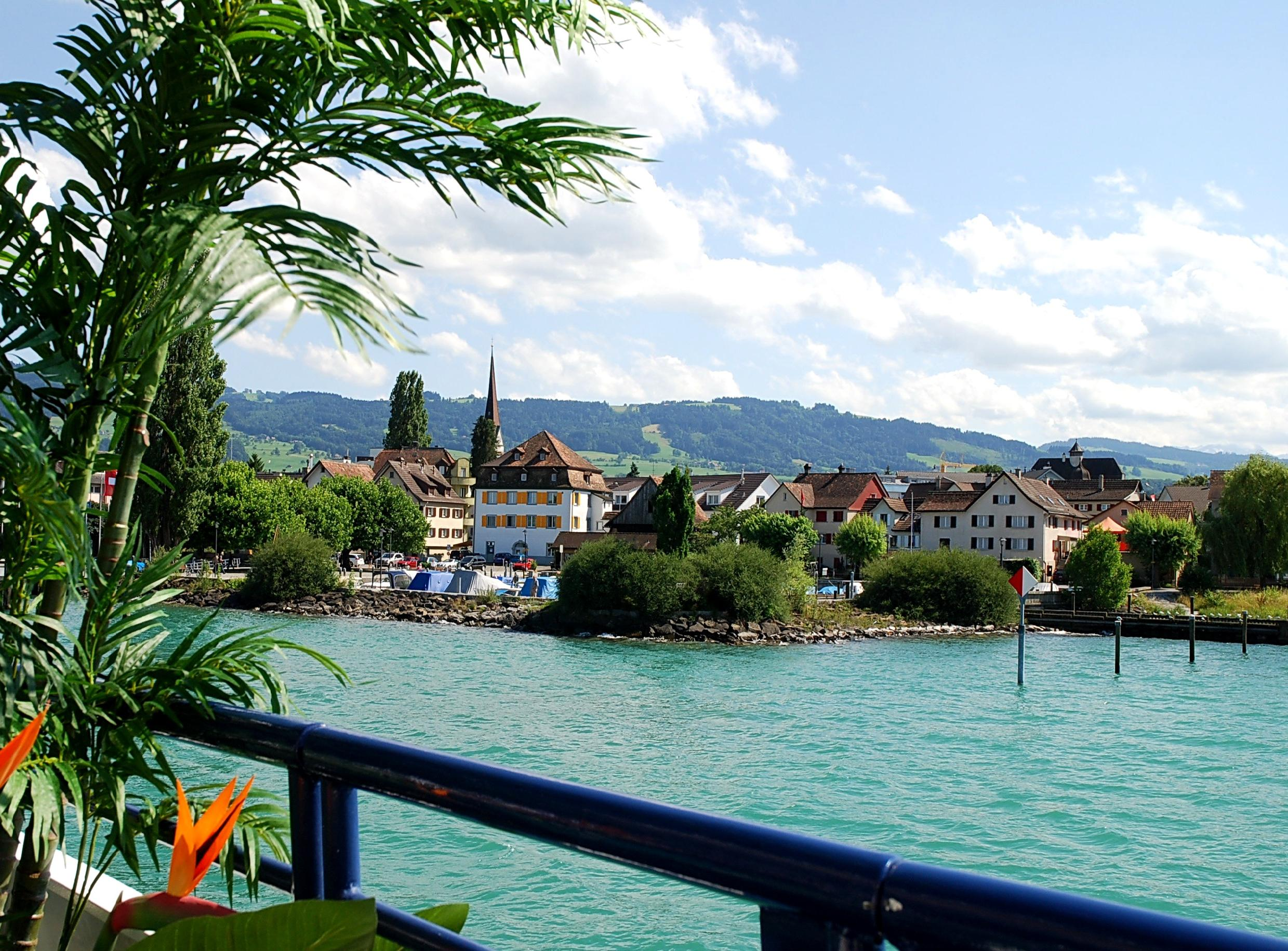
- Horn village

- Coat of arms
- Location of Horn
- Location within Switzerland Location within Canton of Thurgau
- Coordinates: 47°30′N 9°28′E
- Country: Switzerland
- Canton: Thurgau
- District: Arbon

Area
  - Total: 1.7 km^{2} (0.66 sq mi)
- Elevation: 402 m (1,319 ft)

Population (December 2007)
  - Total: 2,429
  - Density: 1,400/km^{2} (3,700/sq mi)
- Time zone: UTC+01:00 (CET)
  - Summer (DST): UTC+02:00 (CEST)
- Postal code: 9326
- SFOS number: 4421
- ISO 3166 code: CH-TG
- Surrounded by: Goldach (SG), Tübach (SG), Steinach (SG), Lake Constance
- Website: www.horn.ch

Horn (Swiss Standard German pronunciation: [hɔrn]) is a municipality in the district of Arbon in the canton of Thurgau in Switzerland. Horn is an exclave of Thurgau, enclaved in the canton of St. Gallen.

== History ==
Horn is first mentioned in 1155 as Horna. The Kehlhof in Horn was built in the 9th century, probably for the Diocese of Constance. In 1463, the Bishop of Constance acquired the entire bailiwick of Horn. Until 1798 the city was under the court at Arbon, where the Bishop held the high and low courts. The geographic and administrative municipalities were established in 1816, and in 1870 merged into a combined municipality.

Horn was in the parish of Arbon.

In 1877 a shared chapel was established. Then, in 1911 the Catholic parish was established, followed by a Reformed parish in 1920.

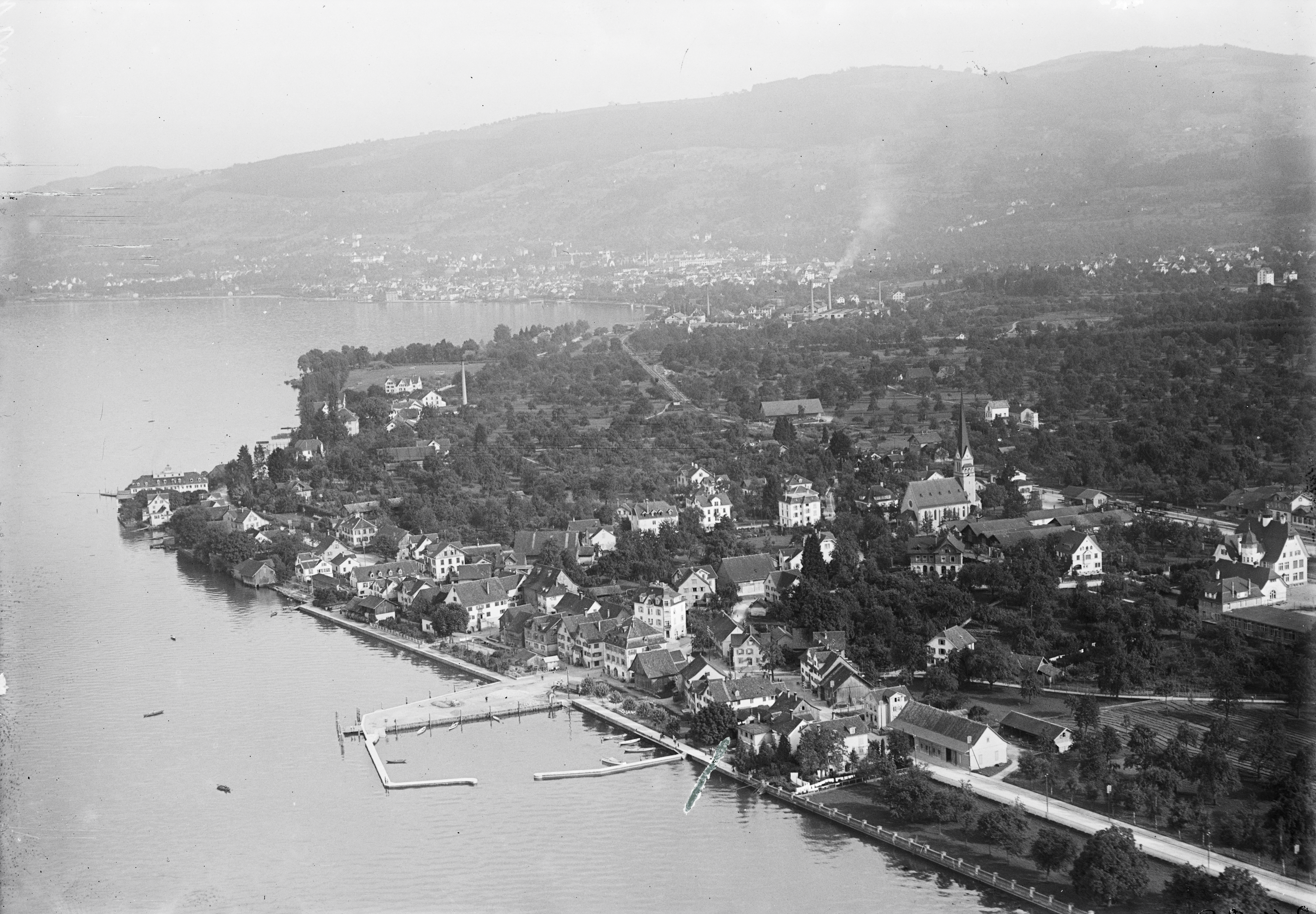
Aerial view from 200 m by Walter Mittelholzer (1923)

In the 19th century the local economy was dominated by fishing, weaving and handicrafts. In 1824 a steamship company began providing regular service, which allowed the economy to grow. Bad Horn in Horn was advertised as a spa and health resort. Towards the end of the 19th century cattle, dairy farming and fruit growing became common in the municipality. After the opening of the SBB line Romanshorn-Rorschach in 1869, the bleaching company, Radun AG (1888), and the oil and fat factory Sais (1916–17), were established in Horn. By 1920, industrial companies displaced much of the agricultural sector. After Radun AG closed the mill in 1989 and the oil factory shut down in 2000, only Unisto AG (later specializing in security seals, name badges and brand profiling) as well as Sabo Specialities, successor of Sais, continued to provide manufacturing jobs.

== Geography ==
Horn has an area, as of 2009, of 1.72 square kilometers (0.66 sq mi). Of this area, 0.71 km^{2} (0.27 sq mi) or 41.3% is used for agricultural purposes, while 0.15 km^{2} (0.058 sq mi) or 8.7% is forested. Of the rest of the land, 0.86 km^{2} (0.33 sq mi) or 50.0% is settled (buildings or roads), 0.01 km^{2} (2.5 acres) or 0.6% is either rivers or lakes and 0.01 km^{2} (2.5 acres) or 0.6% is unproductive land.

Of the built up area, industrial buildings made up 22.7% of the total area while housing and buildings made up 9.3%. Power and water infrastructure as well as other special developed areas made up 7.0% of the area while parks, green belts and sports fields made up 11.0%. Out of the forested land, 4.7% of the total land area is heavily forested and 4.1% is covered with orchards or small clusters of trees. Of the agricultural land, 38.4% is used for growing crops, while 2.9% is used for orchards or vine crops. All the water in the municipality is flowing water.

The municipality is located in the Arbon, on Lake Constance between Arbon and Rorschach. It consists of the village of Horn.

== Demographics ==
Horn has a population (as of December 2020) of 2,888. As of 2008, 16.3% of the population are foreign nationals. Over the last 10 years (1997–2007) the population has changed at a rate of 2%. Most of the population (as of 2000) speaks German (90.1%), with Italian being second most common ( 2.7%) and Portuguese being third ( 1.5%).

As of 2008, the gender distribution of the population was 50.2% male and 49.8% female. The population was made up of 1,034 Swiss men (40.5% of the population), and 246 (9.6%) non-Swiss men. There were 1,101 Swiss women (43.2%), and 170 (6.7%) non-Swiss women. In 2008 there were 18 live births to Swiss citizens and births to non-Swiss citizens, and in same time span there were 28 deaths of Swiss citizens and 1 non-Swiss citizen death. Ignoring immigration and emigration, the population of Swiss citizens decreased by 10 while the foreign population decreased by 1. There was 1 Swiss man, 14 non-Swiss men who emigrated from Switzerland to another country and 7 non-Swiss women who emigrated from Switzerland to another country. The total Swiss population change in 2008 (from all sources) was an increase of 94 and the non-Swiss population change was an increase of 22 people. This represents a population growth rate of 4.8%.

The age distribution, as of 2009, in Horn is; 236 children or 9.1% of the population are between 0 and 9 years old and 284 teenagers or 11.0% are between 10 and 19. Of the adult population, 287 people or 11.1% of the population are between 20 and 29 years old. 353 people or 13.7% are between 30 and 39, 445 people or 17.2% are between 40 and 49, and 356 people or 13.8% are between 50 and 59. The senior population distribution is 288 people or 11.1% of the population are between 60 and 69 years old, 187 people or 7.2% are between 70 and 79, there are 126 people or 4.9% who are between 80 and 89, and there are 22 people or 0.9% who are 90 and older.

As of 2000, there were 1,057 private households in the municipality, and an average of 2.2 persons per household. In 2000 there were 187 single family homes (or 59.0% of the total) out of a total of 317 inhabited buildings. There were 22 two family buildings (6.9%), 28 three family buildings (8.8%) and 80 multi-family buildings (or 25.2%). There were 656 (or 27.1%) persons who were part of a couple without children, and 1,154 (or 47.7%) who were part of a couple with children. There were 128 (or 5.3%) people who lived in single parent home, while there are 23 persons who were adult children living with one or both parents, 14 persons who lived in a household made up of relatives, 16 who lived in a household made up of unrelated persons, and 62 who are either institutionalized or live in another type of collective housing.

The vacancy rate for the municipality, in 2008, was 2.45%. As of 2007, the construction rate of new housing units was 4.5 new units per 1000 residents. In 2000 there were 1,132 apartments in the municipality. The most common apartment size was the 4 room apartment of which there were 381. There were 39 single room apartments and 112 apartments with six or more rooms. As of 2000 the average price to rent an average apartment in Horn was 1056.30 Swiss francs (CHF) per month (US$850, £480, €680 approx. exchange rate from 2000). The average rate for a one-room apartment was 482.61 CHF (US$390, £220, €310), a two-room apartment was about 806.76 CHF (US$650, £360, €520), a three-room apartment was about 974.84 CHF (US$780, £440, €620) and a six or more room apartment cost an average of 1509.00 CHF (US$1210, £680, €970). The average apartment price in Horn was 94.7% of the national average of 1116 CHF.

In the 2007 federal election the most popular party was the SVP which received 39.71% of the vote. The next three most popular parties were the CVP (22.13%), the FDP (13.85%) and the SP (12.23%). In the federal election, a total of 687 votes were cast, and the voter turnout was 42.3%.

The historical population is given in the following table:

year	population
1850	403
1900	700
1950	1,288
1980	1,909
1990	2,218
2000	2,421

== Economy ==
As of 2007, Horn had an unemployment rate of 1.64%. As of 2005, there were 22 people employed in the primary economic sector and about 8 businesses involved in this sector. 350 people are employed in the secondary sector and there are 28 businesses in this sector. 684 people are employed in the tertiary sector, with 98 businesses in this sector.

In 2000 there were 1,599 workers who lived in the municipality. Of these, 863 or about 54.0% of the residents worked outside Horn while 711 people commuted into the municipality for work. There were a total of 1,447 jobs (of at least 6 hours per week) in the municipality. Of the working population, 8.2% used public transportation to get to work, and 51.6% used a private car.

== Religion ==
From the 2000 census, 1,161 or 48.0% were Roman Catholic, while 824 or 34.0% belonged to the Swiss Reformed Church. Of the rest of the population, there were 2 Old Catholics (or about 0.08% of the population) who belonged to the Christian Catholic Church of Switzerland there are 32 individuals (or about 1.32% of the population) who belong to the Orthodox Church, and there are 36 individuals (or about 1.49% of the population) who belong to another Christian church. There were 65 (or about 2.68% of the population) who are Islamic. There are 6 individuals (or about 0.25% of the population) who belong to another church (not listed on the census), 211 (or about 8.72% of the population) belong to no church, are agnostic or atheist, and 84 individuals (or about 3.47% of the population) did not answer the question.

== Education ==
The entire Swiss population is generally well educated. In Horn about 77.6% of the population (between age 25-64) have completed either non-mandatory upper secondary education or additional higher education (either university or a Fachhochschule).

Horn is home to the Horn primary and secondary school district. In the 2008/2009 school year there are 193 students. There are 43 children in the kindergarten, and the average class size is 21.5 kindergartners. Of the children in kindergarten, 22 or 51.2% are female, 4 or 9.3% are not Swiss citizens and 4 or 9.3% do not speak German natively. The lower and upper primary levels begin at about age 5-6 and lasts for 6 years. There are 67 children in who are at the lower primary level and 83 children in the upper primary level. The average class size in the primary school is 18.75 students. At the lower primary level, there are 28 children or 41.8% of the total population who are female, 11 or 16.4% are not Swiss citizens and 9 or 13.4% do not speak German natively. In the upper primary level, there are 36 or 43.4% who are female, 14 or 16.9% are not Swiss citizens and 13 or 15.7% do not speak German natively. At the secondary level, students are divided according to performance.

The secondary level begins at about age 12 and usually lasts 3 years. In Horn, there are 76 teenagers who are in special or remedial classes, of which 42 or 55.3% are female, 4 or 5.3% are not Swiss citizens and 4 or 5.3% do not speak German natively.

== See also ==
- Horn railway station
