= St. Gallen District =

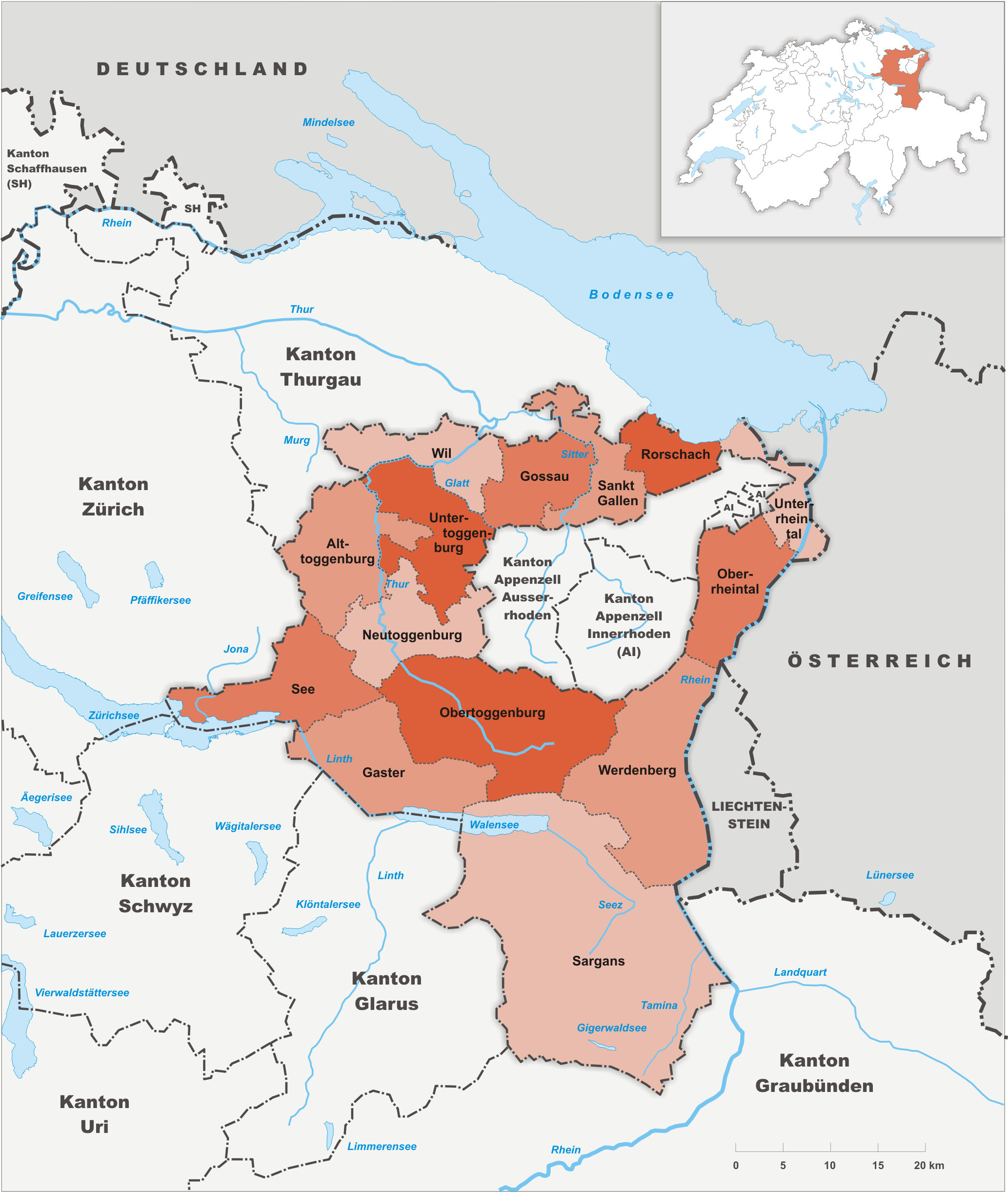
Map of the canton of St. Gallen with 14 districts as valid before 2003

St. Gallen District (German: Bezirk St. Gallen) is a former administration unit of the canton of St. Gallen in Switzerland. It included the municipalities of St. Gallen, Wittenbach, Häggenschwil and Muolen.

Under the influence of the French revolution of July 1830, people of the canton of St. Gallen forced a new, more liberal constitution, its third since its installation by Napoleon's (act of mediation) in 1803. A constitution council prepared it, and included, among many other changes, a reformation of the administration by introducing 14 districts.

In a plebiscite in March 1831, it was accepted comfortably, but lacked democratic legitimation as votes of people who did not attend had been added to those of the supporters.

The district system worked well for the following decades, but administration changes steadily eroded the importance of the districts. So, when the canton of St. Gallen got its sixth constitution in 2001 (after 110 years, at that), they were replaced by eight constituencies. Considering, among others, demographics, people's geographical orientation, and efficiency of administration, these new electoral districts include not necessarily the same communities as the 14 former districts. In the former district of St. Gallen (now Wahlkreis St. Gallen), they do but five more municipalities were included: Andwil, Eggersriet, Gaiserwald, Gossau and Waldkirch.
