= Tablat, St. Gallen =

Former Swiss municipality and district

Tablat
- Former municipality
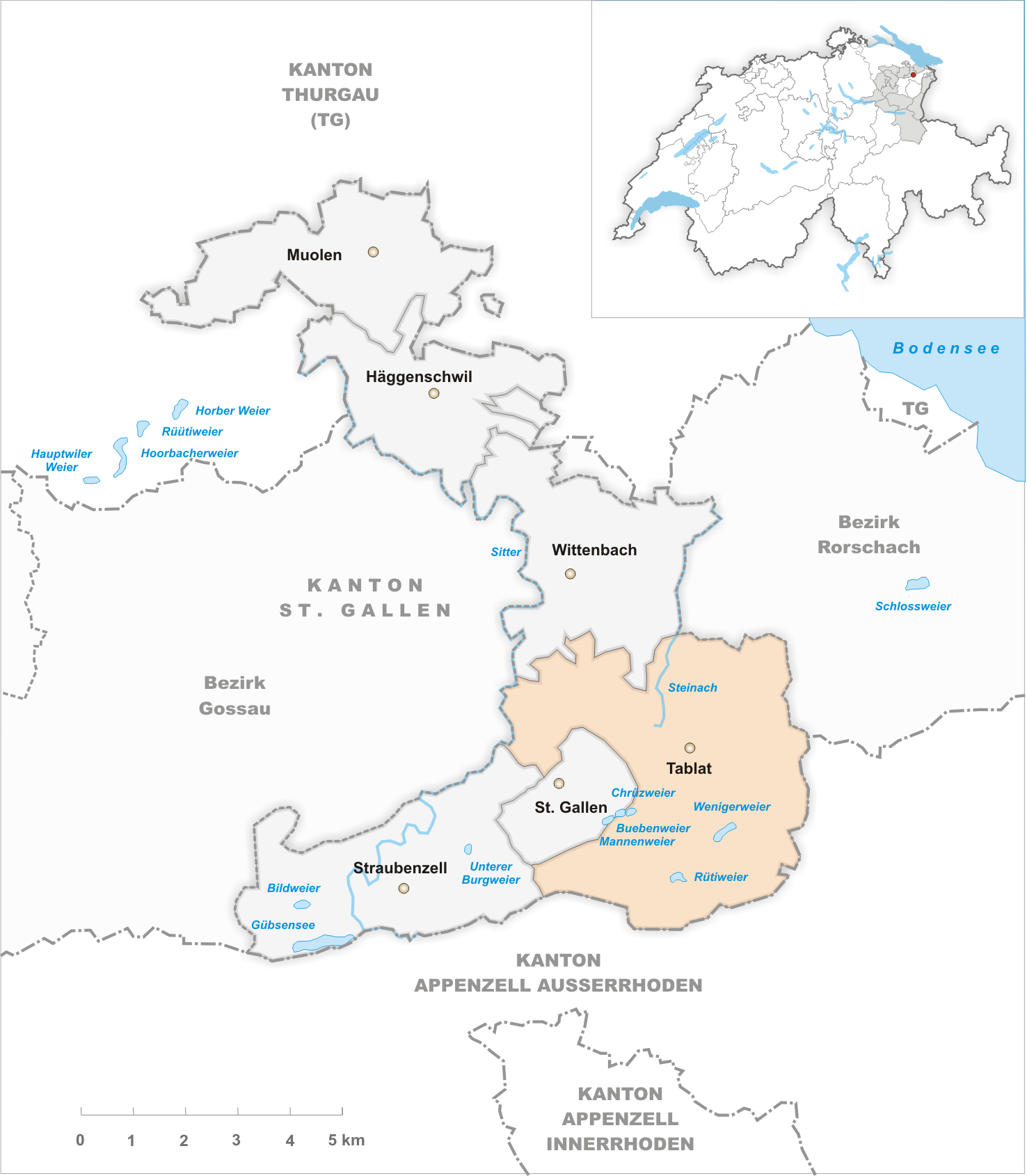
- The municipality of Tablat in 1917
- Location of Tablat
- Location within Switzerland Location within Canton of St. Gallen
- Coordinates: 47.4364°N 9.4186°E
- Country: Switzerland
- Canton: St. Gallen
- District: St. Gallen
- Municipality: St. Gallen

Population (1918)
  - Total: 19,137
- Time zone: UTC+01:00 (CET)
  - Summer (DST): UTC+02:00 (CEST)
- ISO 3166 code: CH-SG
- Website

Tablat is a former municipality and former district of the canton of St. Gallen, Switzerland. It covered the eastern, northern and southern parts of today's city of St. Gallen, namely the quarters of St. Fiden, Krontal, Neudorf, Stephanshorn, Achslen, Wilen, Rotmonten, Langgass, Heiligkreuz, St. Georgen and Notkersegg, and, as an exclave, the abbey precinct (Stiftseinfang), the grounds of the former Abbey of St. Gallen. In 1918 the municipalities of St. Gallen, Straubenzell and Tablat united to form the new political municipality of St. Gallen. The district of Tablat was abolished, and its remaining independent municipalities, Wittenbach, Häggenschwil and Muolen, were assigned to the new district of St. Gallen (since 2003 the St. Gallen region).

== History ==
St. Fiden with its church, between 1900 and 1910

From the Middle Ages Tablat consisted of scattered single farmsteads, among them the farm of Tablat (1255 Tablat), which gave the municipality its name. There was never a village of Tablat; St. Fiden (1166 sancte Fidis) was the municipality's center. In the gorge of the Goldach stood two castles: Falkenstein, in the 13th century the seat of the St. Gallen ministeriales of the same name, and Rappenstein, of unclear origin, which in the 15th century belonged to Rudolf Mötteli (from Ravensburg).

The Abbey of St. Gallen probably acquired its possessions in what later became Tablat in the early Middle Ages by clearing the land, and at first administered them directly. Later it granted them out as fiefs and kept only the low jurisdiction. The farms of Tablat, which together were also called Oberwittenbach, belonged to the Meieramt (stewardship) of Wittenbach, while Rotmonten formed a Meieramt of its own. The abbey redeemed the imperial bailiwicks (Reichsvogteien) over Wittenbach and Rotmonten from the counts of Werdenberg in 1345 and bought back the high jurisdiction over Rotmonten from Hans von Andwil in 1452; with this it gained territorial lordship (Landesherrschaft) over the area of the later political municipality of Tablat. Probably in 1458 Tablat was separated from Wittenbach and became a court (Gericht) of its own, while Rotmonten remained a Hauptmannschaft (subdivision) of the abbot's court (Hofgericht) until 1798.

The parish church for Tablat and Rotmonten was the church of St. Laurenzen, and after the Reformation the abbey church (today the cathedral), both in the city of St. Gallen. The church of St. Fiden, probably built around 1080 and rebuilt in 1776–1778, was a filial church; its chaplain, as coadjutor, was responsible for Tablat and Rotmonten. A chapel dedicated to Saint George, built before 912, formed the core of the hamlet of St. Georgen; in 1451 it was endowed with a chaplain's benefice. In Heiligkreuz a pilgrimage church was built in 1776 in place of a wayside cross. Of the two convents in Tablat, the Benedictine convent of St. Wiborada in St. Georgen was dissolved in 1834, while the convent of Notkersegg still existed at the beginning of the 21st century.

Important steps in Tablat's development as a commune were its elevation to a court of its own around 1458, the fixing of its boundaries in the Offnung (customary law code) of 1471, the Einzugsordnung (rules on the admission of newcomers) of 1567, which drew a clear line between members of the commune (Gemeindegenossen) and outsiders, and the commune ordinance (Gemeindeordnung) of 1681. Rotmonten developed communal structures of its own. The old division of Tablat's land into farms held in fief from the abbot (Lehenhöfe) was broken up by inheritance, so that small farms predominated under the Ancien régime. The estates in Rotmonten were also fiefs of the Abbey of St. Gallen. The farmers (Hofleute) of Tablat, Rotmonten and Wittenbach had common rights to the pasture on the Espen. By the end of the 17th century grassland farming predominated, although arable farming was also practiced. The St. Gallen textile industry (linen, and from the 18th century also cotton and embroidery) gave the rural population work at home. St. Fiden and St. Georgen were Tablat's centers of crafts and trade; St. Fiden was also where officials of the prince-abbot's court lived and was at times the seat of the Lehenvogt (the abbot's official for fiefs). The Hintersassen (residents without full communal rights) made up about one fifth of the population in 1633 and about one quarter in the 18th century.

In 1803 Tablat and Rotmonten were united to form the new political municipality of Tablat, which was assigned to the district of Rorschach, and in 1831 to the newly created district of Tablat. The former abbey precinct of St. Gallen (Stiftseinfang) was part of Tablat under the constitution from 1831; before that it had been part of it only for administrative purposes. The local citizens' community (Ortsgemeinde) of Tablat outlasted the abolition of the political municipality and the district and still existed at the beginning of the 21st century; the Ortsgemeinde of Rotmonten merged into the Ortsbürgergemeinde of St. Gallen in 2009.

Although Tablat kept its rural character until the second half of the 19th century, industrial plants arose along the Steinach from 1811: spinning mills, the Weniger machine works (around the middle of the 19th century the third-largest in Switzerland), the Maestrani chocolate factory and others. Tablat became a real industrial area in the last third of the 19th century, and above all around 1900, in the wake of the St. Gallen embroidery industry. In 1910 there were about a dozen firms that manufactured and exported embroidery, and several more for embroidery finishing.

The main roads from St. Gallen to Rorschach, Steinach and Konstanz had always crossed the territory of Tablat and Rotmonten. In 1856 Tablat was connected to the Winterthur–St. Gallen–Rorschach railway, later part of the Swiss Federal Railways, and in 1910 to the line of the Bodensee–Toggenburg railway. The municipality was also linked to the city of St. Gallen by tram (1897) and by the Mühleggbahn (1893). The population grew strongly before the First World War (almost 8% a year in 1900–1910), partly through the immigration of many foreign workers. In 1910 they made up 40% of the population, half of them Italians. Through heavy building activity Tablat grew together with St. Gallen. Poor housing conditions, above all among the immigrants, led in 1909 to the founding of the first housing inspectorate in Switzerland.

There were three independent school communities (Schulgemeinden) in Tablat, which were abolished in 1918 together with the political municipality: Catholic Tablat (1834), which grew out of the school that had existed in St. Fiden since about 1600 and from 1906 also ran a school of its own for Italian children; Protestant Tablat (1852/1862); and Rotmonten (1862). After the convent of St. Wiborada was dissolved, the Catholic teachers' seminary was set up there, and in 1839 the priests' seminary, which still existed at the beginning of the 21st century.

Tablat had about 900–1,000 inhabitants around 1470, about 2,700 around 1800, 4,424 in 1850, 22,308 in 1910 and 19,137 in 1918.

== Bibliography ==
- E. Ziegler (ed.), Tablat und Rotmonten, 1991
