= Straubenzell =

Former municipality, canton of St. Gallen

- Former municipality
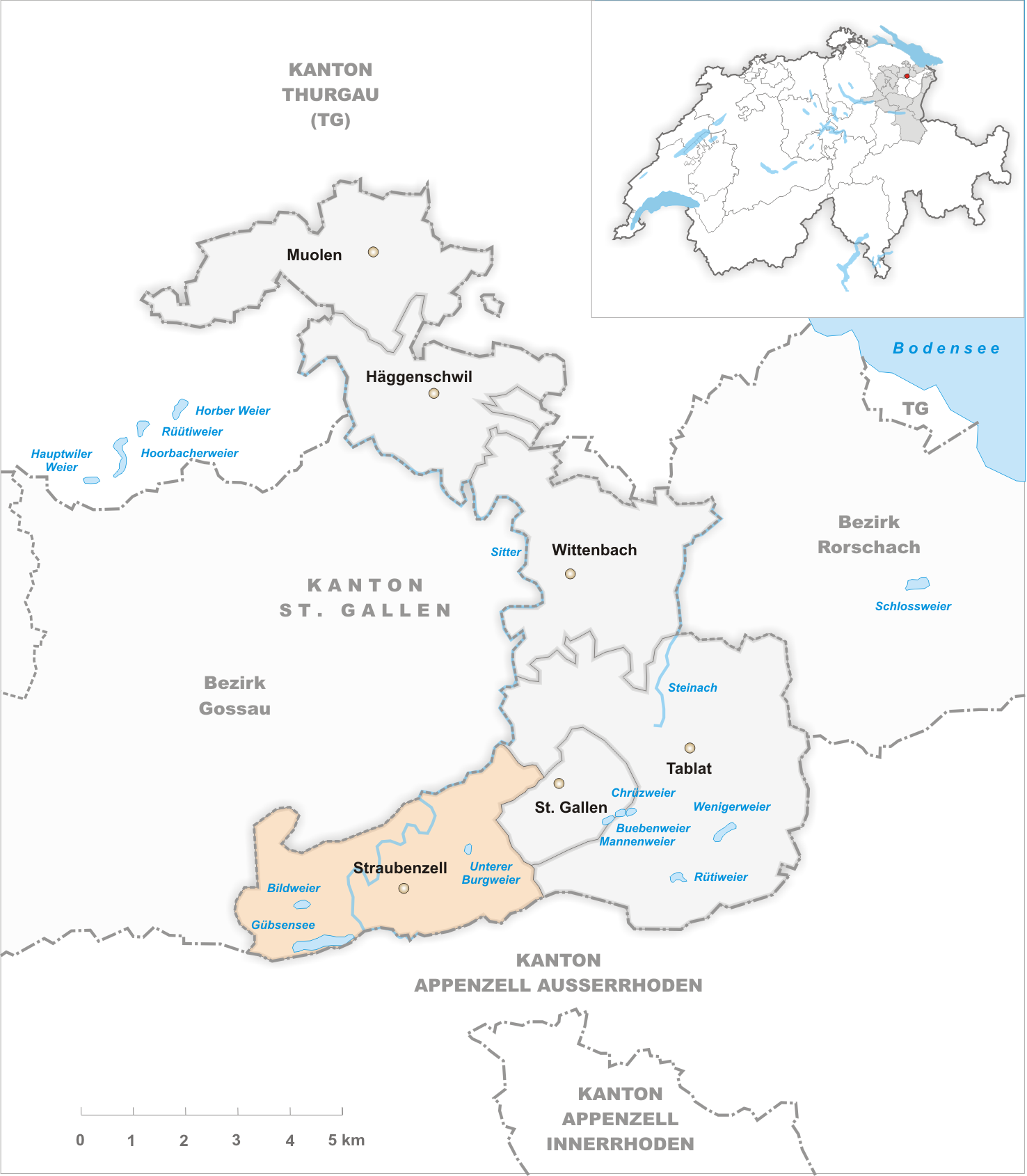
- The municipality of Straubenzell in 1917
- Location of Straubenzell
- Location within Switzerland Location within Canton of St. Gallen
- Coordinates: 47.4072°N 9.32964°E
- Country: Switzerland
- Canton: St. Gallen
- District: St. Gallen
- Municipality: St. Gallen

Population (1910)
  - Total: 15,305
- Time zone: UTC+01:00 (CET)
  - Summer (DST): UTC+02:00 (CEST)
- ISO 3166 code: CH-SG
- Website

Straubenzell is a former municipality of the canton of St. Gallen, Switzerland. It consisted of the parish village of Bruggen, several settlements, among them Lachen, Vonwil, Schönenwegen, Haggen, Kräzern and Winkeln, and farmsteads. In the 19th century parts of it developed into important industrial sites, and in 1918 it was incorporated into the city of St. Gallen.

== History ==
Straubenzell is first mentioned in 1167 as de Strubuncello. In 1824 Roman coins were found near Bruggen. The municipality's territory is crossed by the gorge of the Sitter (Sittergraben), and the traffic from the abbey and the city of St. Gallen toward the west passed over its bridges. The castles of Spisegg and Sturzenegg attested to the importance of the Sitter bridges for transport.

In the early Middle Ages the Abbey of St. Gallen probably cleared the area of Straubenzell itself and administered it directly. The abbot's court (Hofgericht) held the jurisdiction. The commune of Straubenzell, mentioned in 1523, was not a court commune (Gerichtsgemeinde) within the prince-abbot's state, but a Hauptmannschaft (subdivision) of the office of the Landshofmeister (the abbey's chief secular official). The Landshofmeister resided in Waldegg Castle. The parish church was the church of St. Laurenzen, and after the Reformation the abbey church (Münster) in St. Gallen. The church dedicated to Saint Martin, built in 1600 in the Bruggen part of the commune, became a parish church only in 1807. In 1567–1572 a leper house (Siechenhaus) for the abbey's Old Land (Alte Landschaft), with the exception of Wil and Rorschach, was built in Bruggen.

Agriculture was the main economic activity until the second half of the 19th century. The Sitter fulling mill (Sitterwalke), bleaching grounds and a drying tower served the textile industry. There were also mills, a paper mill of the abbey, brickworks, a lime kiln and a brewery.

The political municipality was created in 1803 and assigned to the district of Rorschach, in 1831 to the district of Gossau, and in 1918 to the district of St. Gallen. Under the influence of the St. Gallen textile industry, the Sitter gorge and other parts of the municipality developed into important industrial sites in the 19th century. Several embroidery factories settled there, for example the firm of Rittmeyer, a leading firm in the early days of machine embroidery. New bridges were built over the Sitter gorge in the 19th and 20th centuries, among them railway bridges. Straubenzell was connected to the railway network in 1856 (the Winterthur–St. Gallen–Rorschach line) and in 1910 (the Bodensee–Toggenburg railway). From 1924 to 1931 an airfield with regular air services operated on the Breitfeld. The Kubel power station went into operation in 1900, and later a private electricity works as well.

Industrialization led around 1900 to a massive growth in population and in the share of foreigners (27% in 1910), and the built-up area grew together with the city of St. Gallen. In 1918 Straubenzell was incorporated into the city of St. Gallen. From the second half of the 20th century the former municipal territory, as the city's West district (Stadtkreis West), saw a building boom. Industrial firms, shopping centers and leisure facilities (a football stadium in 2008) led to the formation of an agglomeration with Gossau at Winkeln.

Straubenzell had 1,252 inhabitants in 1689, 1,769 in 1837, 2,200 in 1850, 8,090 in 1900 and 15,305 in 1910.

== Bibliography ==
- J. Staehelin, Straubenzell in seiner Geschichte, 1943
- Straubenzeller Buch, 1986
- Straubenzell, 2006
