= Rhine Valley =

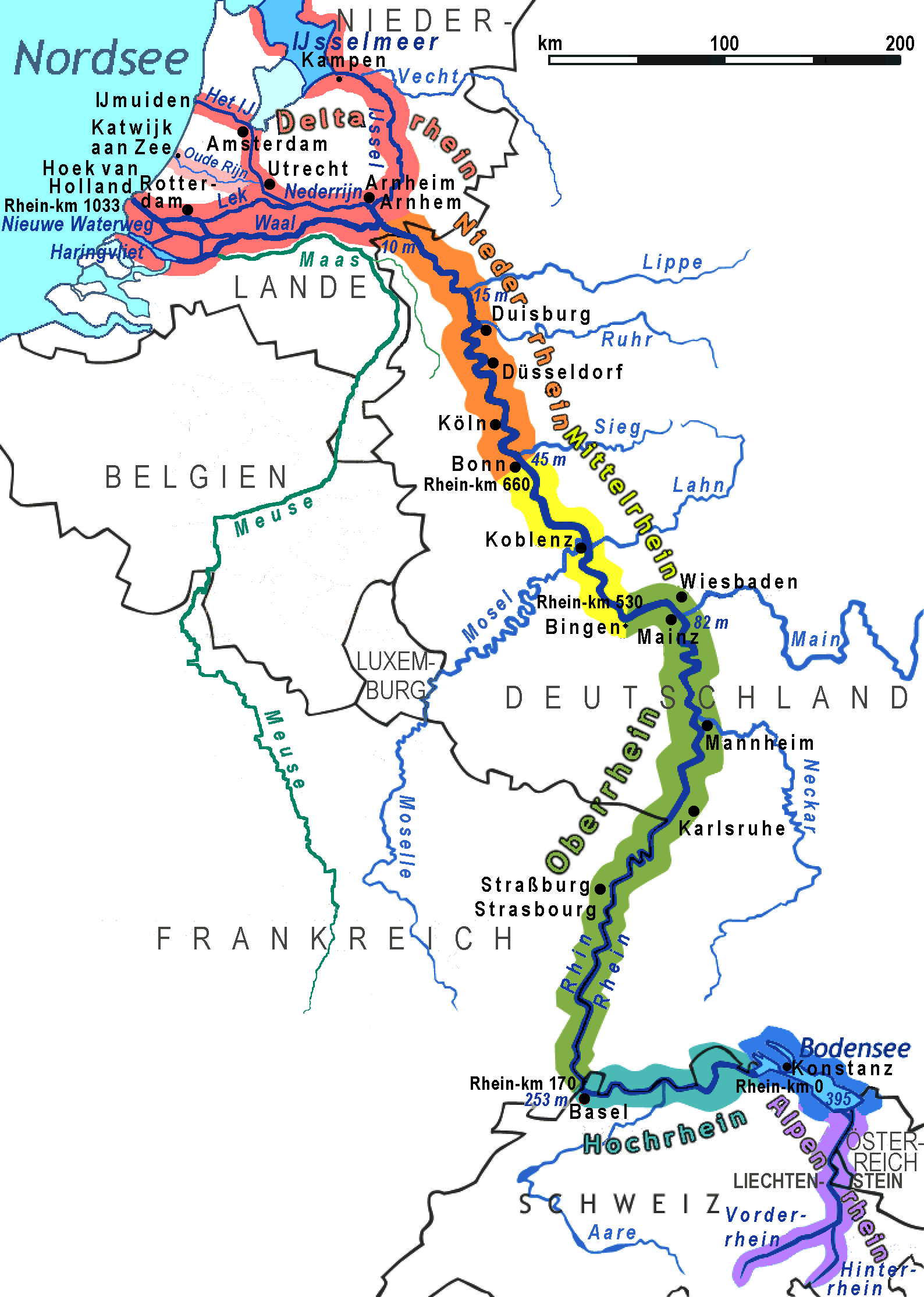
Sections of the Rhine

Rhine Valley (German: Rheintal [ˈʁaɪntaːl]) is the valley, or any section of it, of the river Rhine in Europe.

Particular valleys of the Rhine or any of its sections:

- Alpine Rhine Valley
  - Chur Rhine Valley (or Grisonian Rhine Valley; German: Churer Rheintal, or sometimes Bündner Rheintal) between Reichenau and Sargans, East Switzerland
  - St. Gallen Rhine Valley (also: St. Gall Rhine Valley; German: St. Galler Rheintal, however commonly known as Rheintal) between Sargans and Lake Constance, East Switzerland
- High Rhine Valley
- Upper Rhine Valley (or Upper Rhine Plain, also known as Rhine Rift Valley; German: Oberrheintal), a rift valley between Basel and Bingen am Rhein, Germany
- Middle Rhine Valley (German: Mittelrheintal)
- Lower Rhine Valley

== See also ==
- Oberrheintal (translation: "Upper Rhine Valley", but not to be confused with the Upper Rhine Valley), a former district in the Canton of St. Gallen, Switzerland, part of the St. Gallen Rhine Valley
- Unterrheintal (translation: "Lower Rhine Valley"), a former district in the Canton of St. Gallen, Switzerland, part of the St. Gallen Rhine Valley
- Rhineland – Historic region of Germany
