= Neutoggenburg District =

Neutoggenburg District (German: Bezirk Neutoggenburg) is a former district of the canton of St. Gallen in Switzerland. It was detached from Obertoggenburg District in 1831, and merged into the single constituency of Toggenburg in 2003.
