= See District =

See District may refer to:

- See District, Fribourg, a district in the canton of Fribourg, Switzerland
- See District, St. Gallen, a former district in the canton of St. Gallen, Switzerland
