= Rorschach =

Rorschach may refer to:

- Hermann Rorschach (1884–1922), Swiss psychiatrist
  - Rorschach test, his psychological evaluation method involving inkblots
- Harold Emil "Bud" Rorschach Jr. (1926–1993), American physicist
- Rorschach (character), a character from the comics Watchmen
- Rorschach (comic book), a 2020 comic
- Rorschach (band), American hardcore punk band
- Rorschach District, district in Switzerland
- Rorschach (film), a 2022 Indian Malayalam-language film by Nisam Basheer
- Rorschach Test (band)
- The name of an alien vessel from Peter Watt's 2006 novel Blindsight
- Poison Ivy Rorschach, an alternative name for Poison Ivy (musician)

== Places ==
- Rorschach (Wahlkreis), a constituency of the canton of St. Gallen, Switzerland
- Rorschach, St. Gallen, a municipality on Lake Constance, the largest town of Rorschach District within the Rorschach constituency, canton of St. Gallen, Switzerland
- Rorschach railway station, the largest railway station in Rorschach, canton of St. Gallen, Switzerland
- Rorschach Hafen railway station, the railway station near the port of Rorschach, canton of St. Gallen, Switzerland
- Rorschach Stadt railway station, the railway station near the town center of Rorschach, canton of St. Gallen, Switzerland
