= Subdivisions of the canton of St. Gallen =

The Canton of St. Gallen until 2002 was divided into 14 districts (German: Bezirke). On 1 January 2003 they were abolished and the canton was divided into 8 constituencies (German: Wahlkreise).

There are (as of 2023) 75 municipalities in the canton.

== Constituencies since 2003 ==
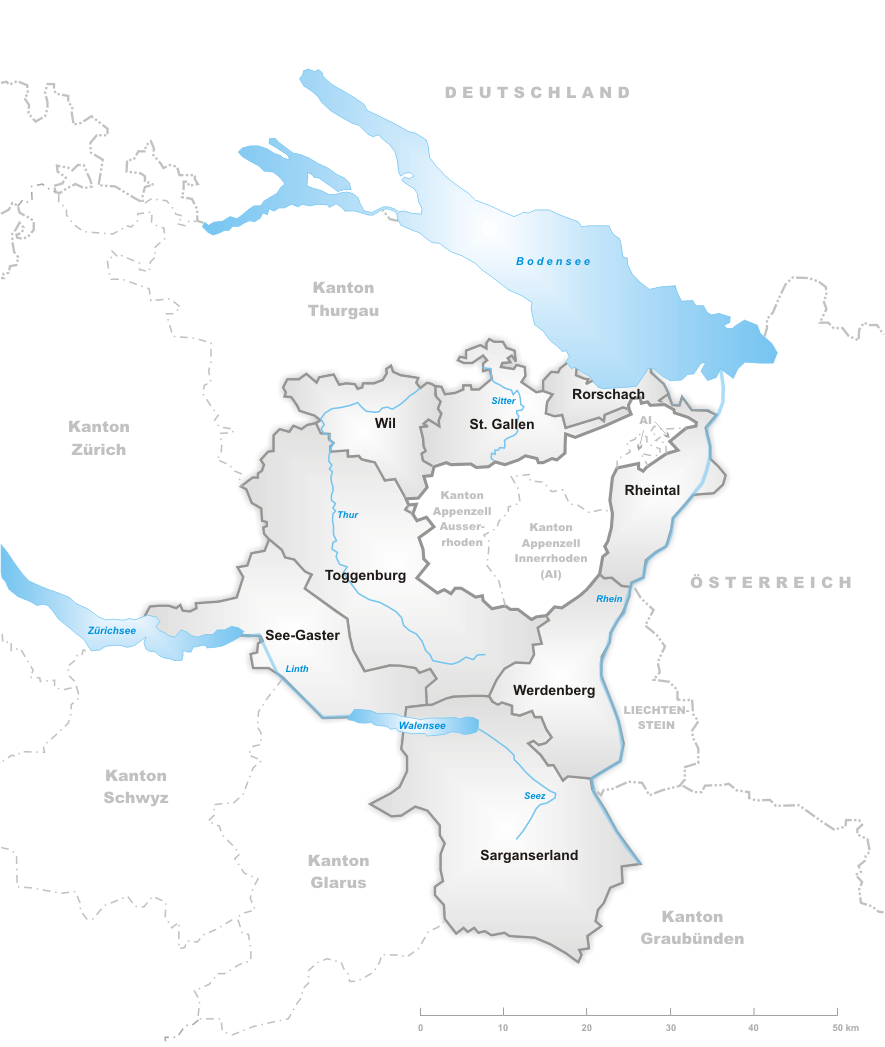
Constituencies of St. Gallen

The canton abolished the district level in 2003, but it remains divided into eight constituencies (Wahlkreise) without administrative significance:

Wahlkreis	Capital	Former district(s)
Rheintal	Altstätten	Oberrheintal, Unterrheintal (except Thal)
Rorschach	Rorschach	Rorschach (except Eggersriet), Thal from Unterrheintal
Sarganserland	Sargans	Sargans
See-Gaster	Rapperswil-Jona	See, Gaster
St. Gallen	St. Gallen	St. Gallen, Gossau and municipality Eggersriet from Rorschach
Toggenburg	Lichtensteig	Alttoggenburg, Neutoggenburg, Obertoggenburg, Untertoggenburg (part)
Werdenberg	Buchs	Werdenberg
Wil	Wil	Wil, Untertoggenburg (except Ganterschwil and Mogelsberg)

== Districts until 2002 ==
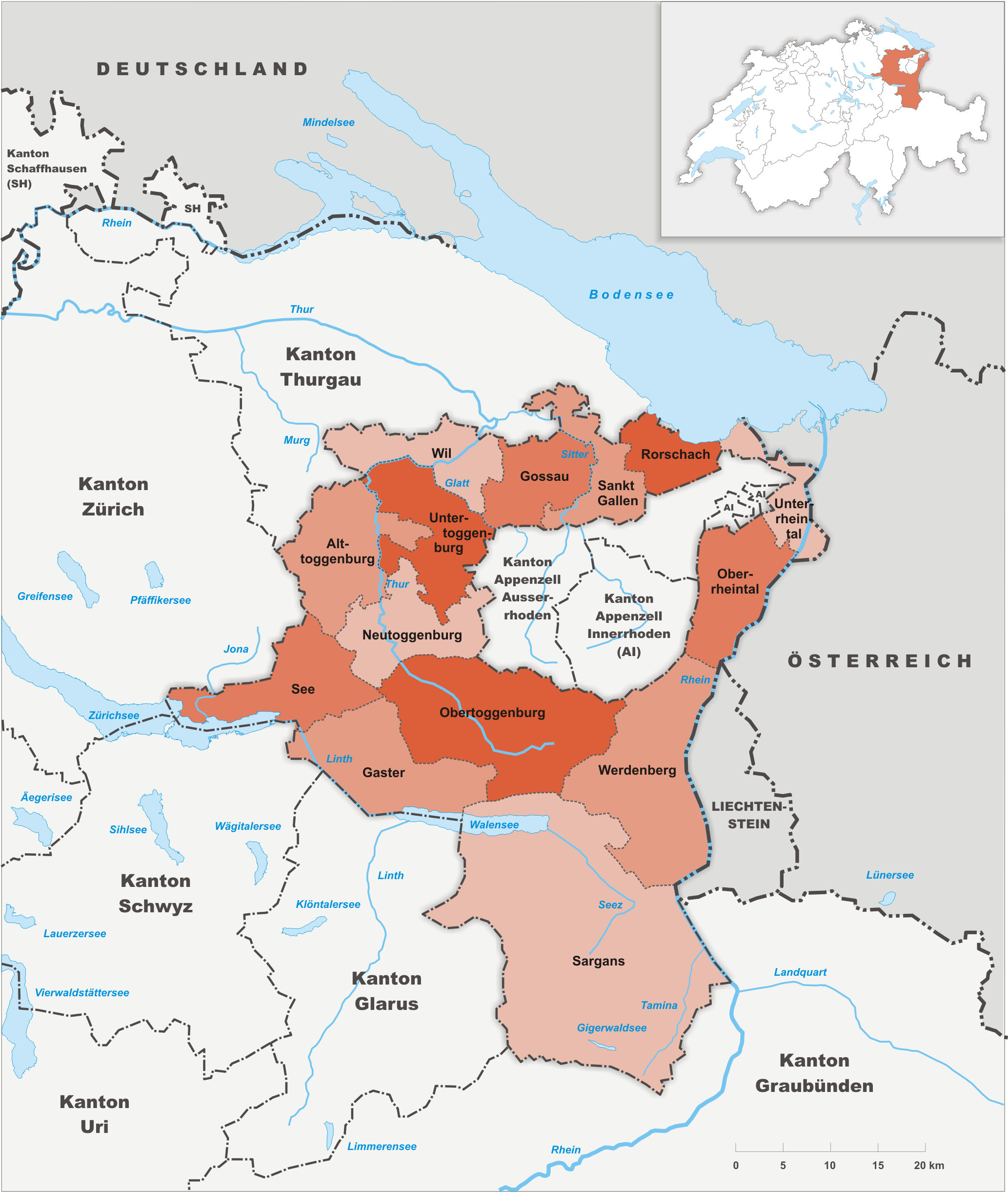
Districts St. Gallen until 2002

- Alttoggenburg
- Gaster
- Gossau
- Neutoggenburg
- Oberrheintal
- Obertoggenburg
- Rorschach
- St. Gallen
- Sargans
- See
- Unterrheintal
- Untertoggenburg
- Werdenberg
- Wil

== See also ==
- de:Ehemalige Bezirke des Kantons St. Gallen
