= Alttoggenburg District =

Defunct district of St. Gallen, Switzerland

Altoggenburg Bezirk Alttoggenburg
- District (Bezirk)
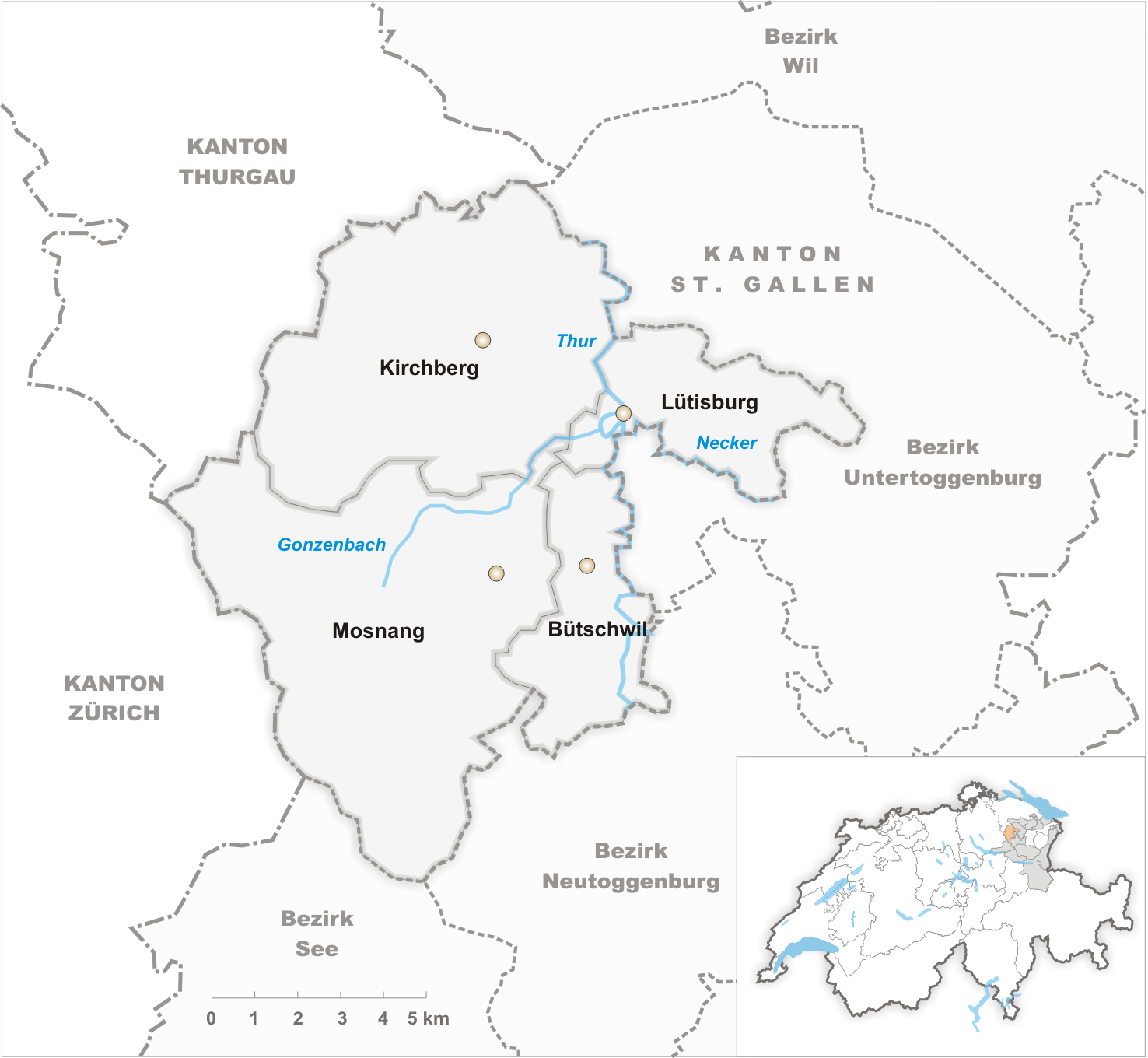
- Map showing the boundaries and municipalities of former Alttoggenburg

- Location of Altoggenburg in Switzerland
- Coordinates: 47°24′N 9°2′E
- Country: Switzerland
- Canton: St. Gallen

Area
  - Total: 120.93 km^{2} (46.69 sq mi)

Population (2002)
  - Total: 15,769
  - Density: 130.40/km^{2} (337.73/sq mi)
- BFS District Number: 1711
- ISO 3166 code: CH-SG

Alttoggenburg District (German: Bezirk Alttoggenburg) is a former district of the canton of St. Gallen in Switzerland. The district existed from its formation in 1831 until the canton's 14 districts (German: Bezirke) were reorganized into 8 constituencies (Wahlkreise) on January 1, 2003. When the district was formed, it was split apart from Untertoggenburg. Today, the area is within the constituency of Toggenburg.

== Communities ==
Alttoggenburg contained four communities. Of these, Kirchberg, Lütisburg, and Mosnang remain organized municipalities, while Bütschwil was merged with a neighboring community in 2013 to form Bütschwil-Ganterschwil.

Coat of Arms	Community name	Area (km²)	Population (2002)
Bütschwil	Bütschwil	13.79	3,584 (Note: This is an estimate. BFS reports that the population of the now-combined Bütschwil-Ganterschwil municipality was 4,705 in 2002. This number is a sum of those living in Bütschwil and Ganterschwil at the time. The population of each of these municipalities in 2000 was 3,550 and 1,111, respectively, for a total of 4,661. The population reported here assumes that the proportion in each community remained the same for two years, leaving an estimated population of 3,584 for Bütschwil in 2002.)
Kirchberg	Kirchberg	42.59	7,875
Lütisburg	Lütisburg	14.09	1,349
Mosnang	Mosnang	50.46	2,961
	Total (4)	120.93	15,769

== See also ==
- Toggenburg
- Counts of Toggenburg, who historically ruled from Alt-Toggenburg Castle in Kirchberg
