= Galgentobel =

Valley in Switzerland

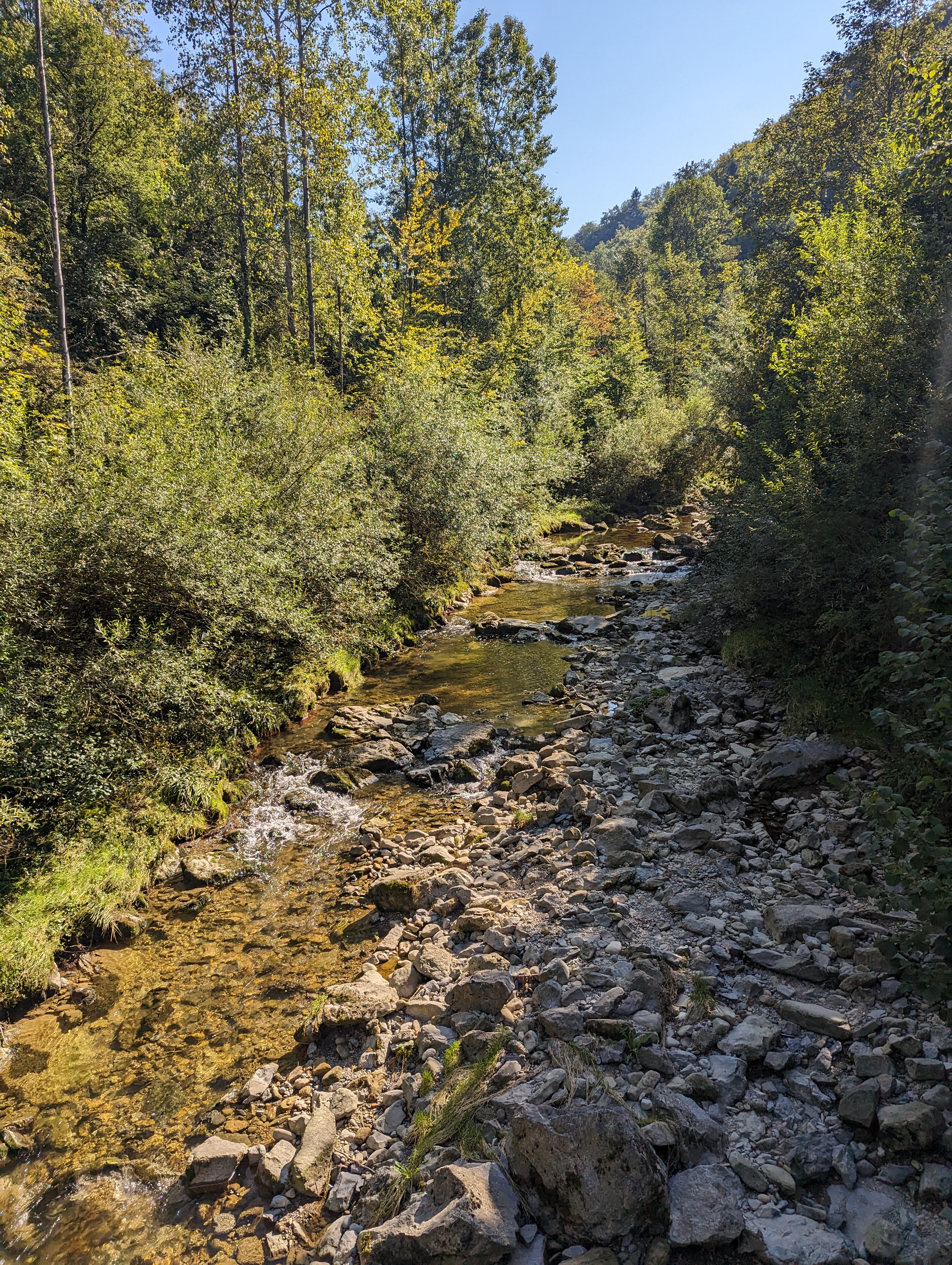
- Length: 6.4 km (4.0 mi)
- Width: 0.41 km (0.25 mi)
- Area: 2.07 km^{2} (0.80 mi^{2})
- Depth: 76.2 m (250 ft)

Geography
- Country: Switzerland
- Canton: St. Gallen
- Constituencies: St. Gallen, Rorschach
- Municipalities: St. Gallen, Wittenbach, Mörschwil, Berg, Steinach
- Coordinates: 47°26′55″N 9°24′00″E
- River: Steinach
- Interactive map of Galgentobel

The Galgentobel (German for Gallows Gorge/Gallows Ravine), is a small gorge east of St. Gallen in Switzerland. The Steinach River flows through the gorge, which flows from its subterranean channel beneath Espenmoos Stadium out into the open. The gorge makes up the upper half of the Steinachtobel (Steinach Gorge), although the names of the two gorges are often used interchangeably. It is typically referred to by the older name of Galgentobel.

The steepest part of the St. Gallen–Rorschach railway line runs along the valley wall, and the difficult topographic conditions and sloping edges have led to multiple interruptions along the line. Landslides are also common in the area, causing occasional obstructions. Aside from a dirt road leading from Mörschwil to the Heiligkreuz district of St. Gallen that was converted to a hiking trail in 2012, no roads lead to the valley.

The gorge's name derives from the abbot's high court gallows, which stood at the current location of the Heiligkreuz Evangelical Church on the west end of the gorge beginning in the early 17th century.

From the valley floor to the top measures about 100 m (328 ft).

The Irish monk Gallus walked through the Galgentobel in the year 612, directly before he founded the hermitage that would become the city of St. Gallen.

== In literature ==
- Martin Arnet: Die Orts- und Flurnamen der Stadt St. Gallen; Kantonales Amt für Kulturpflege St. Gallen; ISBN 3-908048-15-X
