= Waldkirch, Switzerland =

Waldkirch
- Municipality
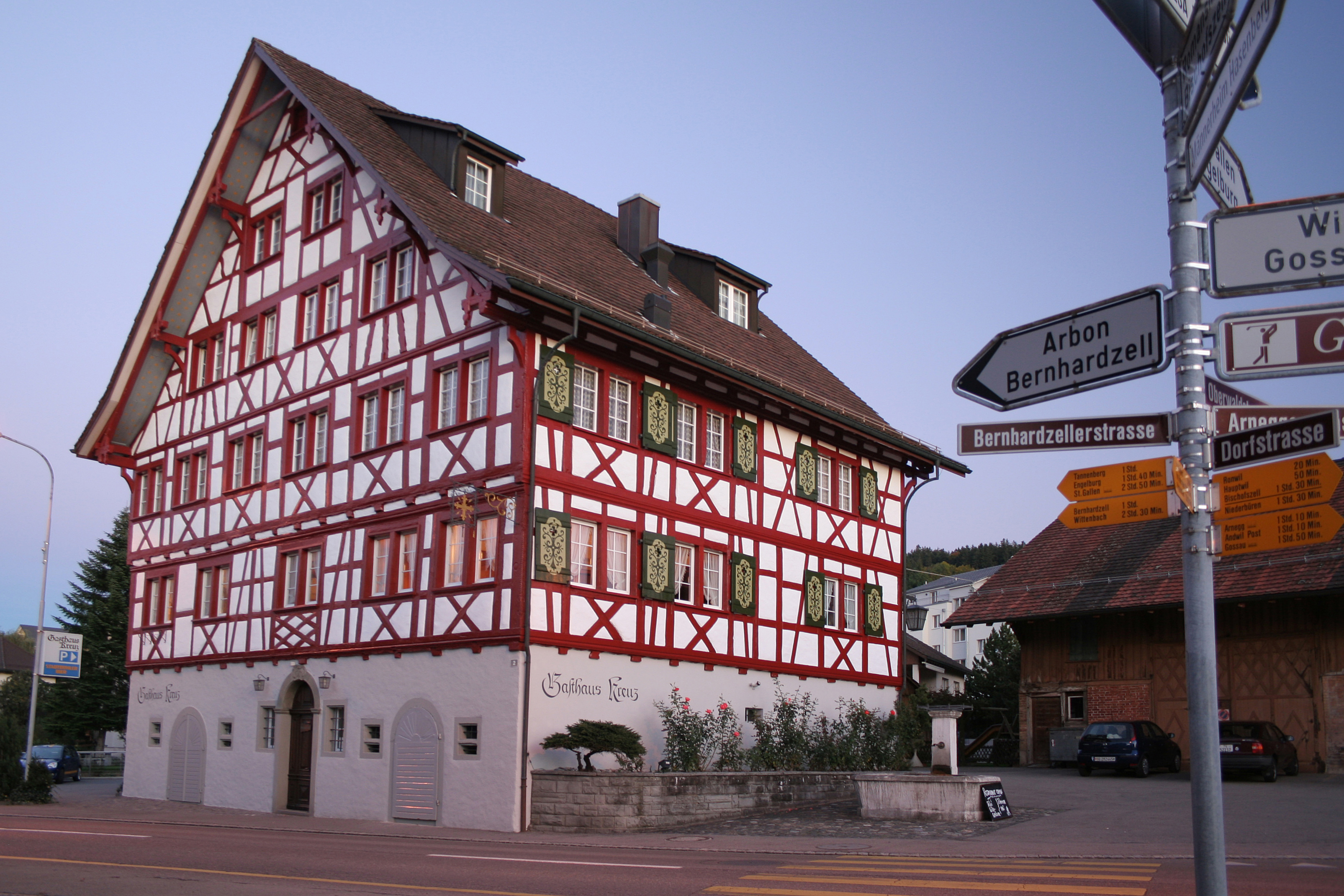
- The Gasthaus Kreuz in Waldkirch

- Coat of arms
- Location of Waldkirch
- Location within Switzerland Location within Canton of St. Gallen
- Coordinates: 47°28′N 9°17′E
- Country: Switzerland
- Canton: St. Gallen
- District: St. Gallen

Government
  - Mayor: Franz Müller

Area
  - Total: 31.25 km^{2} (12.07 sq mi)
- Elevation: 620 m (2,030 ft)

Population (December 2020)
  - Total: 3,559
  - Density: 113.9/km^{2} (295.0/sq mi)
- Time zone: UTC+01:00 (CET)
  - Summer (DST): UTC+02:00 (CEST)
- Postal code: 9205
- SFOS number: 3444
- ISO 3166 code: CH-SG
- Surrounded by: Andwil, Bischofszell (TG), Gaiserwald, Gossau, Häggenschwil, Hauptwil-Gottshaus (TG), Niederbüren, Wittenbach
- Website: www.waldkirch.ch

Waldkirch (Swiss Standard German pronunciation: [ˈvaldˌkɪrç]) is a municipality in the Wahlkreis (constituency) of St. Gallen in the canton of St. Gallen in Switzerland.

== Geography ==
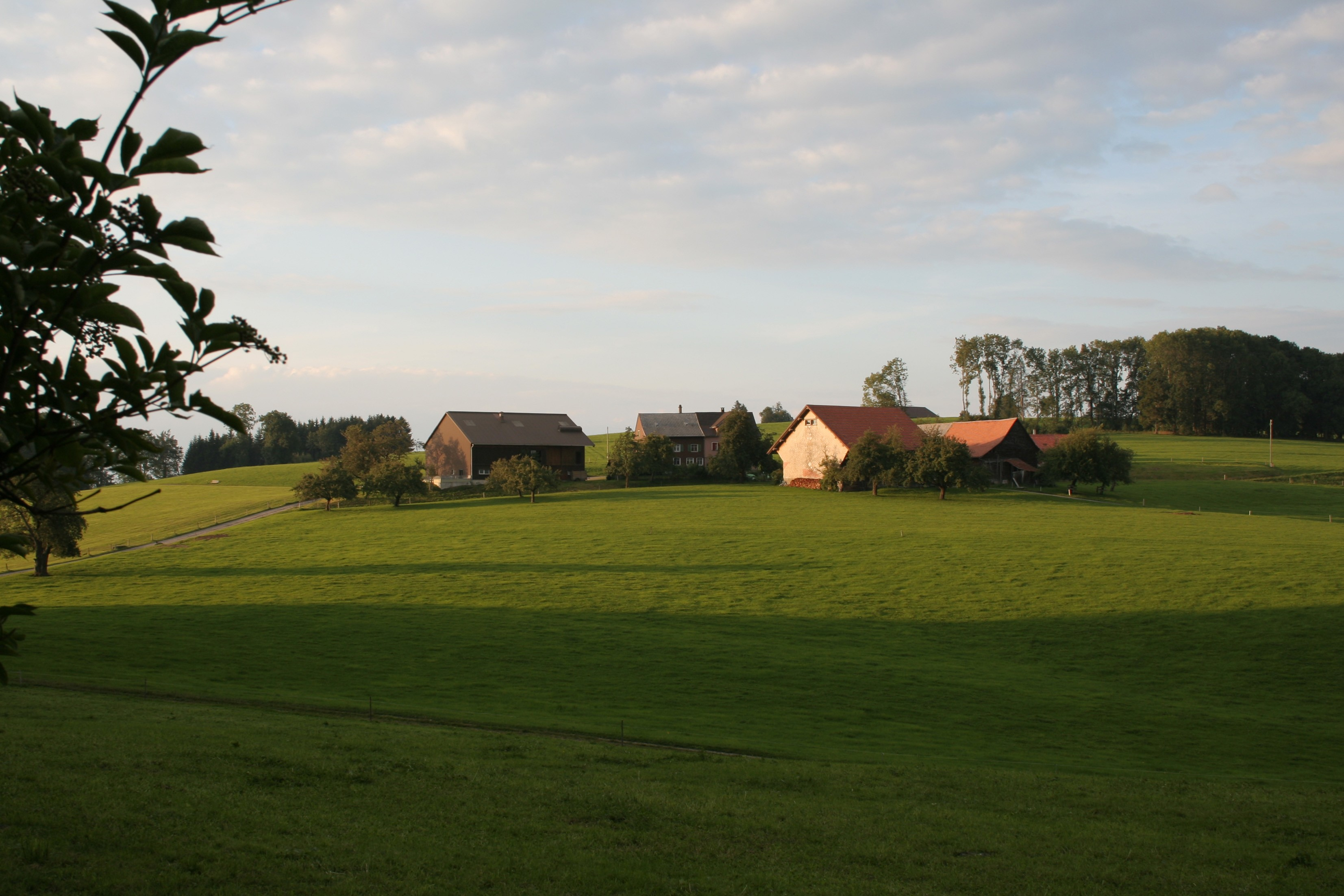
Oberwil hamlet

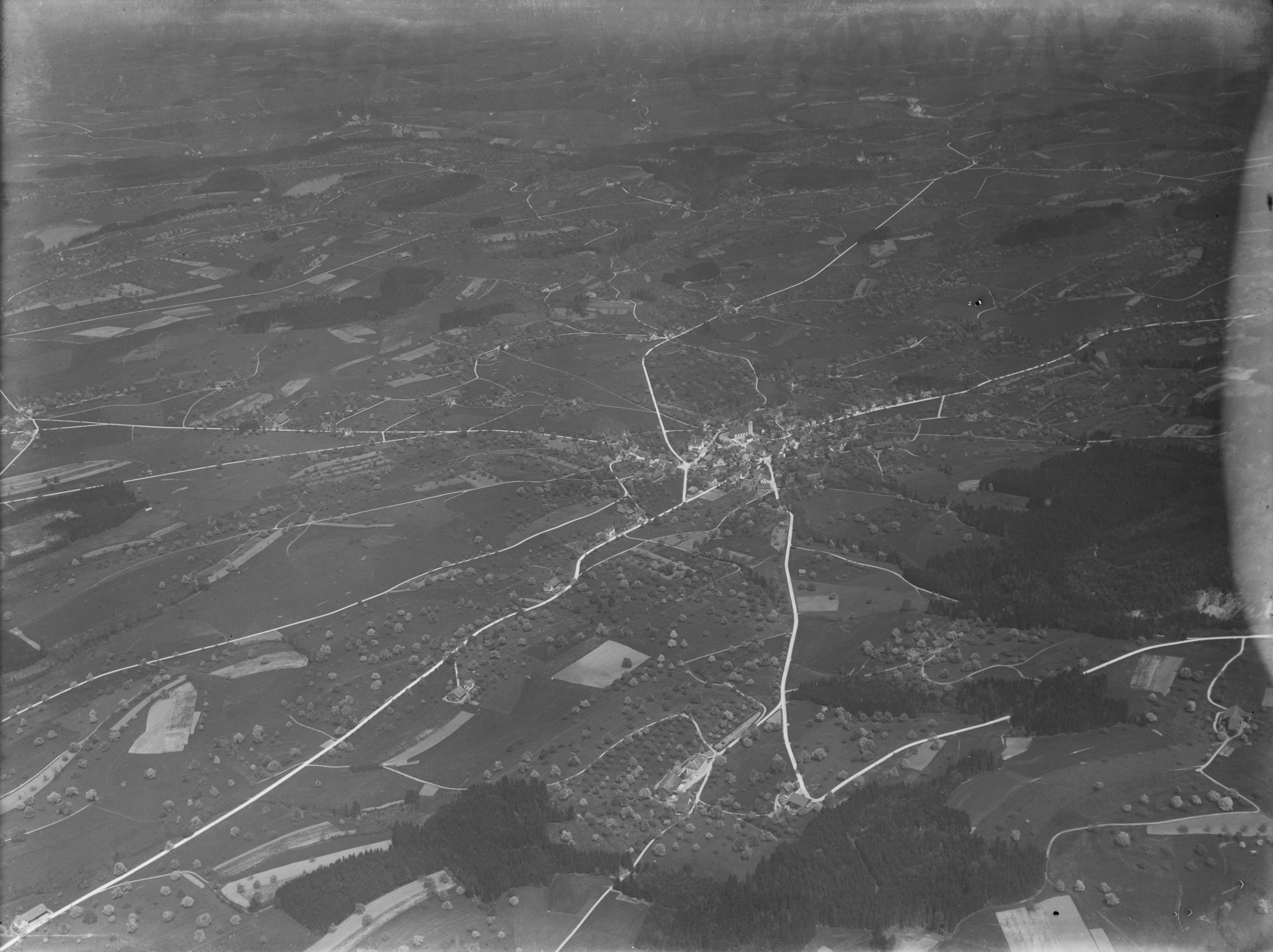
Aerial view from 1000 m by Walter Mittelholzer (1919)

Waldkirch has an area, as of 2006, of 31.3 km^{2} (12.1 sq mi). Of this area, 63.8% is used for agricultural purposes, while 29% is forested. Of the rest of the land, 6.7% is settled (buildings or roads) and the remainder (0.5%) is non-productive (rivers or lakes).

== Coat of arms ==
The blazon of the municipal coat of arms is Or a Church Argent roofed Gules windowed and with a clock Sable between two Pine Trees Vert on a Base of the same.

This is an example of canting with the trees German: Wald and the church German: Kirch symbolizing the municipal name.

== Demographics ==
Waldkirch has a population (as of 31 December 2020) of 3,559. As of 2007, about 6.1% of the population was made up of foreign nationals. Of the foreign population, (as of 2000), 21 are from Germany, 16 are from Italy, 64 are from ex-Yugoslavia, 17 are from Austria, and 40 are from another country. Over the last 10 years the population has grown at a rate of 9.1%. Most of the population (as of 2000) speaks German (95.9%), with Portuguese being second most common ( 1.1%) and Albanian being third ( 0.9%). Of the Swiss national languages (as of 2000), 2,914 speak German, 14 people speak French, 5 people speak Italian, and 1 person speaks Romansh.

The age distribution, as of 2000, in Waldkirch is; 447 children or 14.7% of the population are between 0 and 9 years old and 473 teenagers or 15.6% are between 10 and 19. Of the adult population, 322 people or 10.6% of the population are between 20 and 29 years old. 515 people or 16.9% are between 30 and 39, 401 people or 13.2% are between 40 and 49, and 349 people or 11.5% are between 50 and 59. The senior population distribution is 237 people or 7.8% of the population are between 60 and 69 years old, 177 people or 5.8% are between 70 and 79, there are 100 people or 3.3% who are between 80 and 89, and there are 19 people or 0.6% who are between 90 and 99.

In 2000 there were 227 persons (or 7.5% of the population) who were living alone in a private dwelling. There were 533 (or 17.5%) persons who were part of a couple (married or otherwise committed) without children, and 1,984 (or 65.3%) who were part of a couple with children. There were 122 (or 4.0%) people who lived in single parent home, while there are 36 persons who were adult children living with one or both parents, 13 persons who lived in a household made up of relatives, 8 who lived household made up of unrelated persons, and 117 who are either institutionalized or live in another type of collective housing.

In the 2007 federal election the most popular party was the SVP which received 42% of the vote. The next three most popular parties were the CVP (30.4%), the FDP (10.4%) and the SP (6.6%).

In Waldkirch about 72.2% of the population (between age 25-64) have completed either non-mandatory upper secondary education or additional higher education (either university or a Fachhochschule). Out of the total population in Waldkirch, as of 2000, the highest education level completed by 688 people (22.6% of the population) was Primary, while 1,099 (36.2%) have completed their secondary education, 277 (9.1%) have attended a Tertiary school, and 104 (3.4%) are not in school. The remainder did not answer this question.

== Heritage sites of national significance ==
The Catholic parish church of St. John the Baptist in Bernhardzell is listed as a Swiss heritage site of national significance.

== Economy ==
As of 2007, Waldkirch had an unemployment rate of 0.75%. As of 2005, there were 398 people employed in the primary economic sector and about 155 businesses involved in this sector. 444 people are employed in the secondary sector and there are 54 businesses in this sector. 650 people are employed in the tertiary sector, with 90 businesses in this sector.

As of October 2009 the average unemployment rate was 1.5%. There were 292 businesses in the municipality of which 47 were involved in the secondary sector of the economy while 99 were involved in the third.

As of 2000 there were 707 residents who worked in the municipality, while 837 residents worked outside Waldkirch and 390 people commuted into the municipality for work.

== Religion ==
From the 2000 census, 2,153 or 70.8% are Roman Catholic, while 511 or 16.8% belonged to the Swiss Reformed Church. Of the rest of the population, there are 4 individuals (or about 0.13% of the population) who belong to the Christian Catholic faith, there are 16 individuals (or about 0.53% of the population) who belong to the Orthodox Church, and there are 90 individuals (or about 2.96% of the population) who belong to another Christian church. There are 22 (or about 0.72% of the population) who are Islamic. There are 5 individuals (or about 0.16% of the population) who belong to another church (not listed on the census), 144 (or about 4.74% of the population) belong to no church, are agnostic or atheist, and 95 individuals (or about 3.13% of the population) did not answer the question.
