= Gaster District =

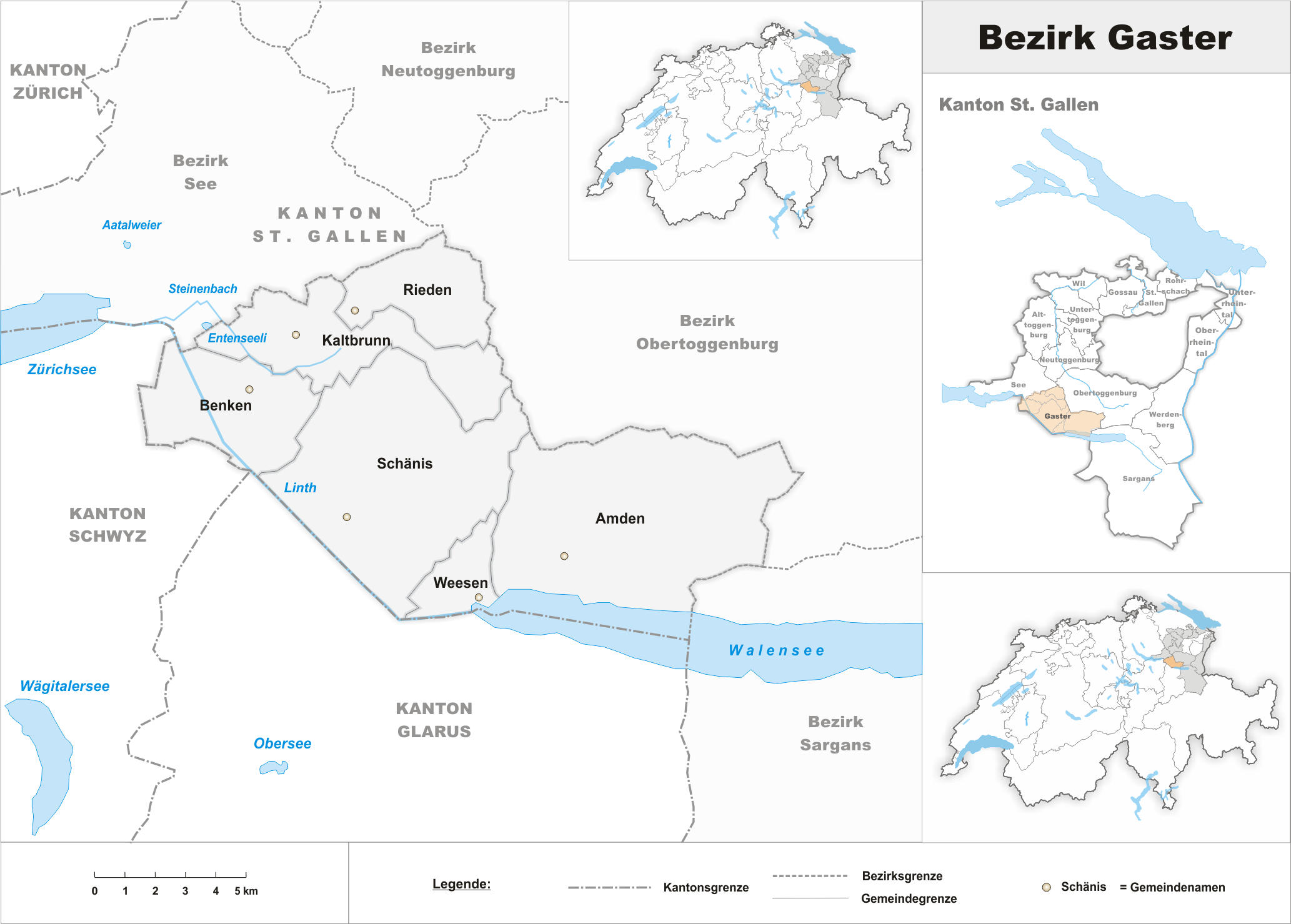

Gaster District (German: Bezirk Gaster) is a former district of the canton of St. Gallen in Switzerland. The Gaster and See districts merged in 2003 to form the See-Gaster constituency.
