= Gossau District =

District of the canton of St. Gallen

Gossau District (German: Bezirk Gossau) is a former district of the canton of St. Gallen in Switzerland. It was formed in 1803 with the creation of the Canton of St. Gallen. Since 2003, it is part of the constituency of St. Gallen.
