= Unterrheintal District =

District in Switzerland

Unterrheintal District (German: Bezirk Unterrheintal) is a former district of the canton of St. Gallen in Switzerland. With the exception of the municipality of Thal, Unterrheintal merged with the Oberrheintal District in 2003 to form Rheintal.
