= Andwil =

- Municipality
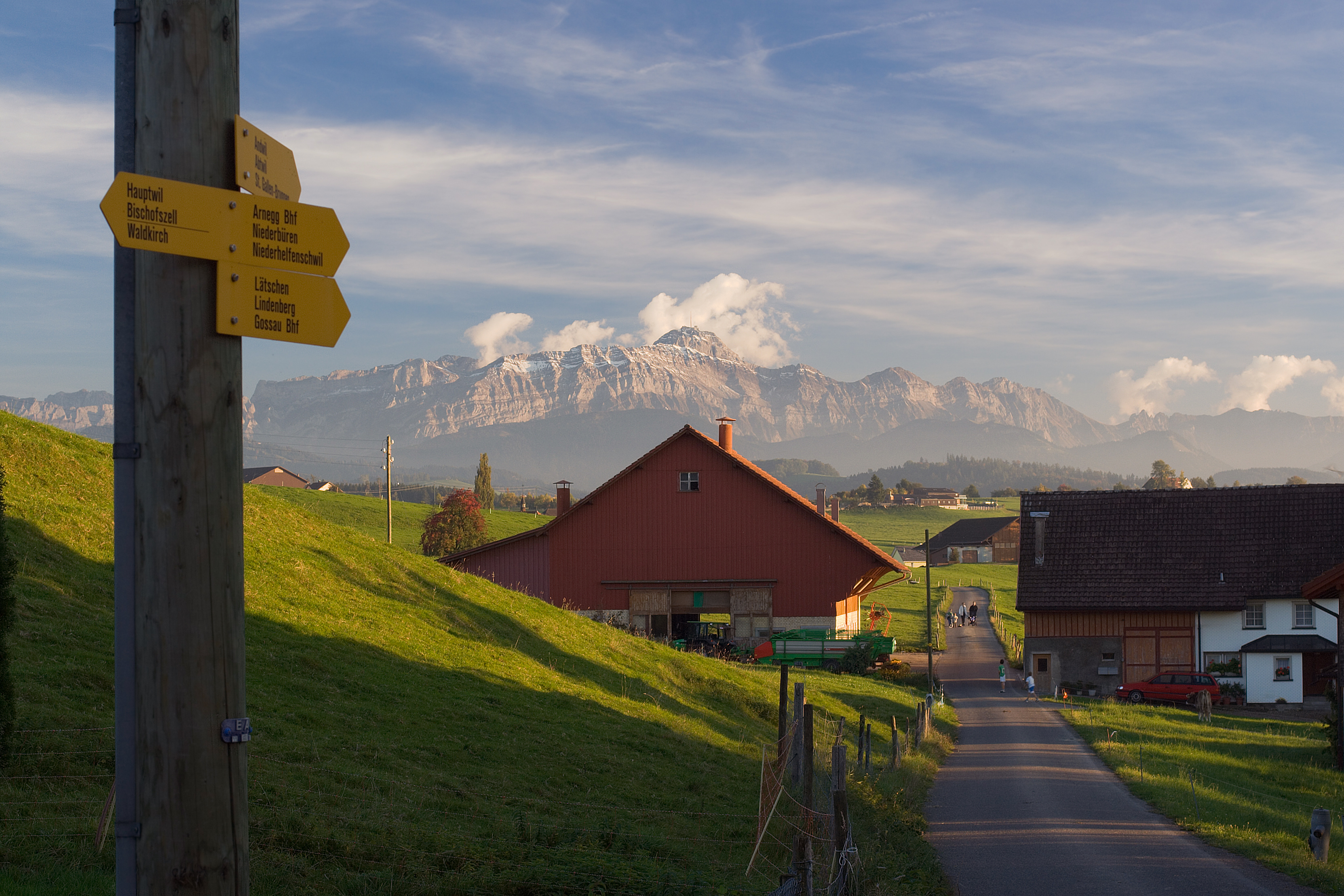

- Coat of arms
- Location of Andwil
- Location within Switzerland Location within Canton of St. Gallen
- Coordinates: 47°26′N 9°17′E
- Country: Switzerland
- Canton: St. Gallen
- District: St. Gallen

Government
  - Mayor: Dominik Gemperli

Area
  - Total: 6.29 km^{2} (2.43 sq mi)
- Elevation: 720 m (2,360 ft)

Population (December 2020)
  - Total: 2,058
  - Density: 327/km^{2} (847/sq mi)
- Time zone: UTC+01:00 (CET)
  - Summer (DST): UTC+02:00 (CEST)
- Postal code: 9204
- SFOS number: 3441
- ISO 3166 code: CH-SG
- Surrounded by: Gaiserwald, Gossau, Waldkirch
- Website: www.andwil.ch

Andwil is a municipality in the Wahlkreis (constituency) of St. Gallen in the canton of St. Gallen in Switzerland.

== History ==
Andwil is first mentioned in 846 as Anninwilare. In 1275 it was mentioned as Annewiler.

== Geography ==
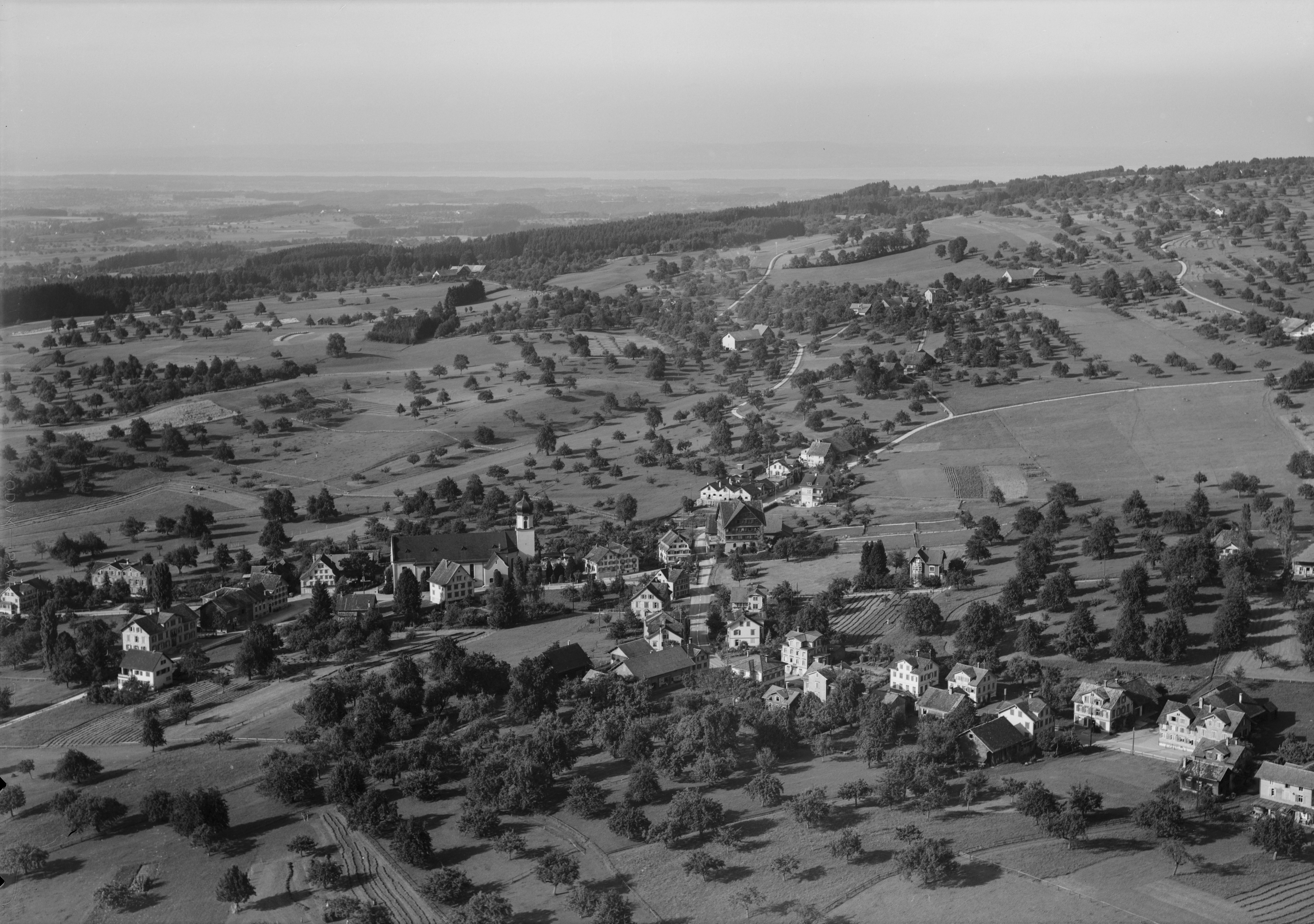
Aerial view (1954)

Andwil has an area, as of 2006, of 6.3 km^{2} (2.4 sq mi). Of this area, 68.5% is used for agricultural purposes, while 20.3% is forested. Of the rest of the land, 9.6% is settled (buildings or roads) and the remainder (1.6%) is non-productive (rivers or lakes).

The municipality is located in the St. Gallen Wahlkreise. It consists of the village of Andwil and the hamlets of Oberarnegg, Fronackeren and Hinterberg, as well as the more distant Andwilermoos.

== Coat of arms ==
The blazon of the municipal coat of arms is Argent a Deer Head couped Gules.

== Demographics ==
Andwil has a population (as of 31 December 2020) of 2,058. As of 2007, about 6.7% of the population was made up of foreign nationals. Of the foreign population, (as of 2000), 11 are from Germany, 16 are from Italy, 47 are from ex-Yugoslavia, 8 are from Austria, 8 are from Turkey, and 24 are from another country. Over the last 10 years the population has grown at a rate of 20%. Most of the population (as of 2000) speaks German (94.6%), with Serbo-Croatian being second most common ( 1.2%) and Albanian being third ( 1.1%). Of the Swiss national languages (as of 2000), 1,473 speak German, 5 people speak French, 9 people speak Italian, and 1 person speaks Romansh.

The age distribution, as of 2000, in Andwil is; 237 children or 15.2% of the population are between 0 and 9 years old and 220 teenagers or 14.1% are between 10 and 19. Of the adult population, 172 people or 11.0% of the population are between 20 and 29 years old. 288 people or 18.5% are between 30 and 39, 190 people or 12.2% are between 40 and 49, and 178 people or 11.4% are between 50 and 59. The senior population distribution is 132 people or 8.5% of the population are between 60 and 69 years old, 93 people or 6.0% are between 70 and 79, there are 44 people or 2.8% who are between 80 and 89, and there are 3 people or 0.2% who are between 90 and 99.

In 2000 there were 143 persons (or 9.2% of the population) who were living alone in a private dwelling. There were 348 (or 22.4%) persons who were part of a couple (married or otherwise committed) without children, and 960 (or 61.7%) who were part of a couple with children. There were 73 (or 4.7%) people who lived in single parent home, while there are 10 persons who were adult children living with one or both parents, 7 persons who lived in a household made up of relatives, 6 who lived household made up of unrelated persons, and 10 who are either institutionalized or live in another type of collective housing.

In the 2007 federal election the most popular party was the SVP which received 38% of the vote. The next three most popular parties were the CVP (29.5%), the FDP (14.5%) and the SP (9.5%).

The entire Swiss population is generally well educated. In Andwil about 79.9% of the population (between age 25-64) have completed either non-mandatory upper secondary education or additional higher education (either university or a Fachhochschule). Out of the total population in Andwil, as of 2000, the highest education level completed by 301 people (19.3% of the population) was Primary, while 609 (39.1%) have completed Secondary, 169 (10.9%) have attended a Tertiary school, and 50 (3.2%) are not in school. The remainder did not answer this question.

The historical population is given in the following table:

year	population
1837	569
1850	571
1900	795
1950	810
1970	943
2000	1,557

== Sights ==
The Kulturlandschaft Matten/Wilen/Zinggenhueb (Cultural region: Matten/Wilen/Zinggenhueb), which is shared between Andwil and Gossau, is designated as part of the Inventory of Swiss Heritage Sites.

== Economy ==
As of 2007, Andwil had an unemployment rate of 0.98%. As of 2005, there were 117 people employed in the primary economic sector and about 35 businesses involved in this sector. 464 people are employed in the secondary sector and there are 31 businesses in this sector. 185 people are employed in the tertiary sector, with 32 businesses in this sector.

As of October 2009 the average unemployment rate was 1.8%. There were 101 businesses in the municipality of which 31 were involved in the secondary sector of the economy while 36 were involved in the third.

As of 2000 there were 235 residents who worked in the municipality, while 565 residents worked outside Andwil and 466 people commuted into the municipality for work.

== Religion ==
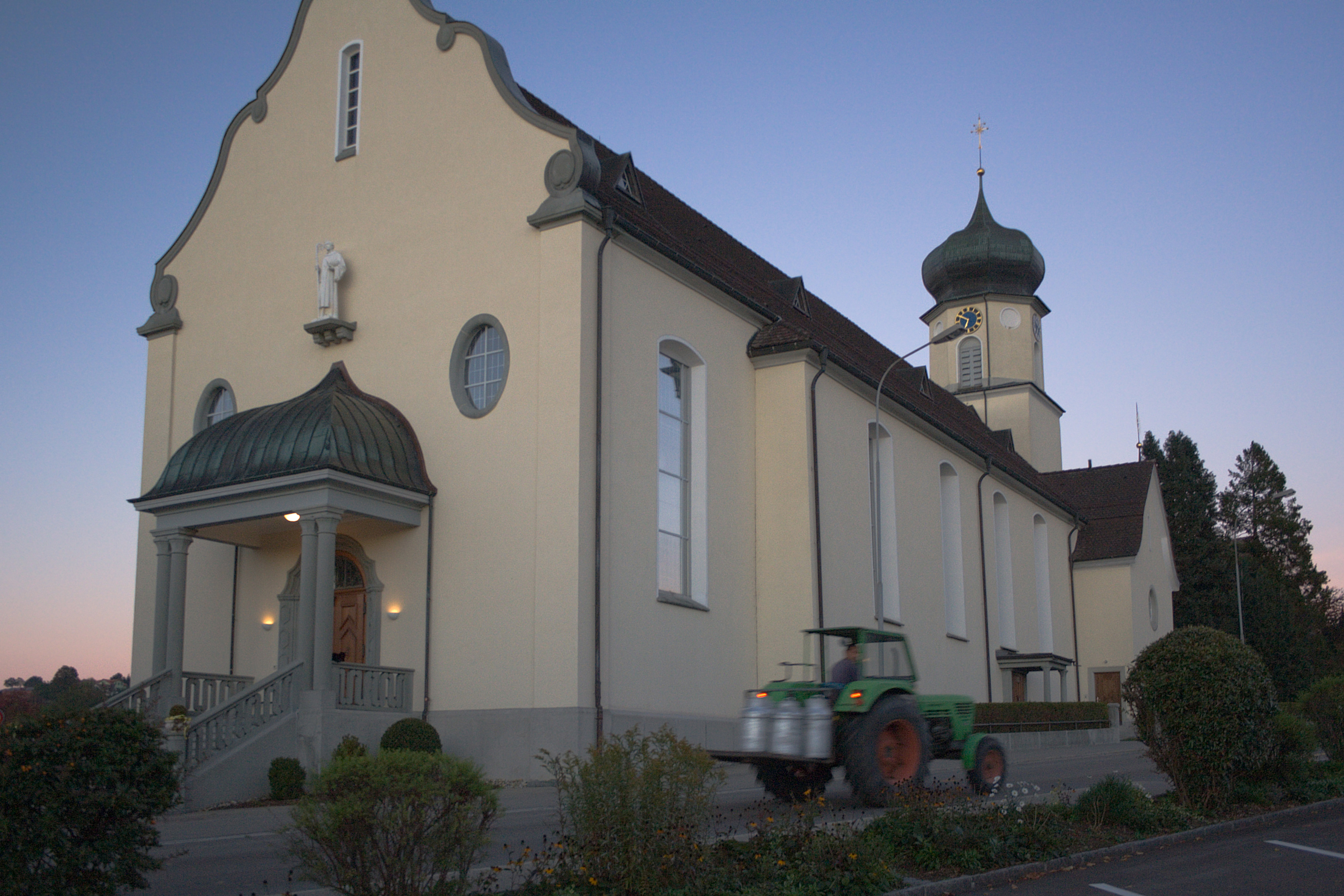
Catholic Church of Andwil

From the 2000 census, 1,053 or 67.6% are Roman Catholic, while 328 or 21.1% belonged to the Swiss Reformed Church. Of the rest of the population, there are 30 individuals (or about 1.93% of the population) who belong to the Orthodox Church, and there are 27 individuals (or about 1.73% of the population) who belong to another Christian church. There are 31 (or about 1.99% of the population) who are Islamic. There are 11 individuals (or about 0.71% of the population) who belong to another church (not listed on the census), 47 (or about 3.02% of the population) belong to no church, are agnostic or atheist, and 30 individuals (or about 1.93% of the population) did not answer the question.
