= Obertoggenburg District =

District of the canton of St. Gallen

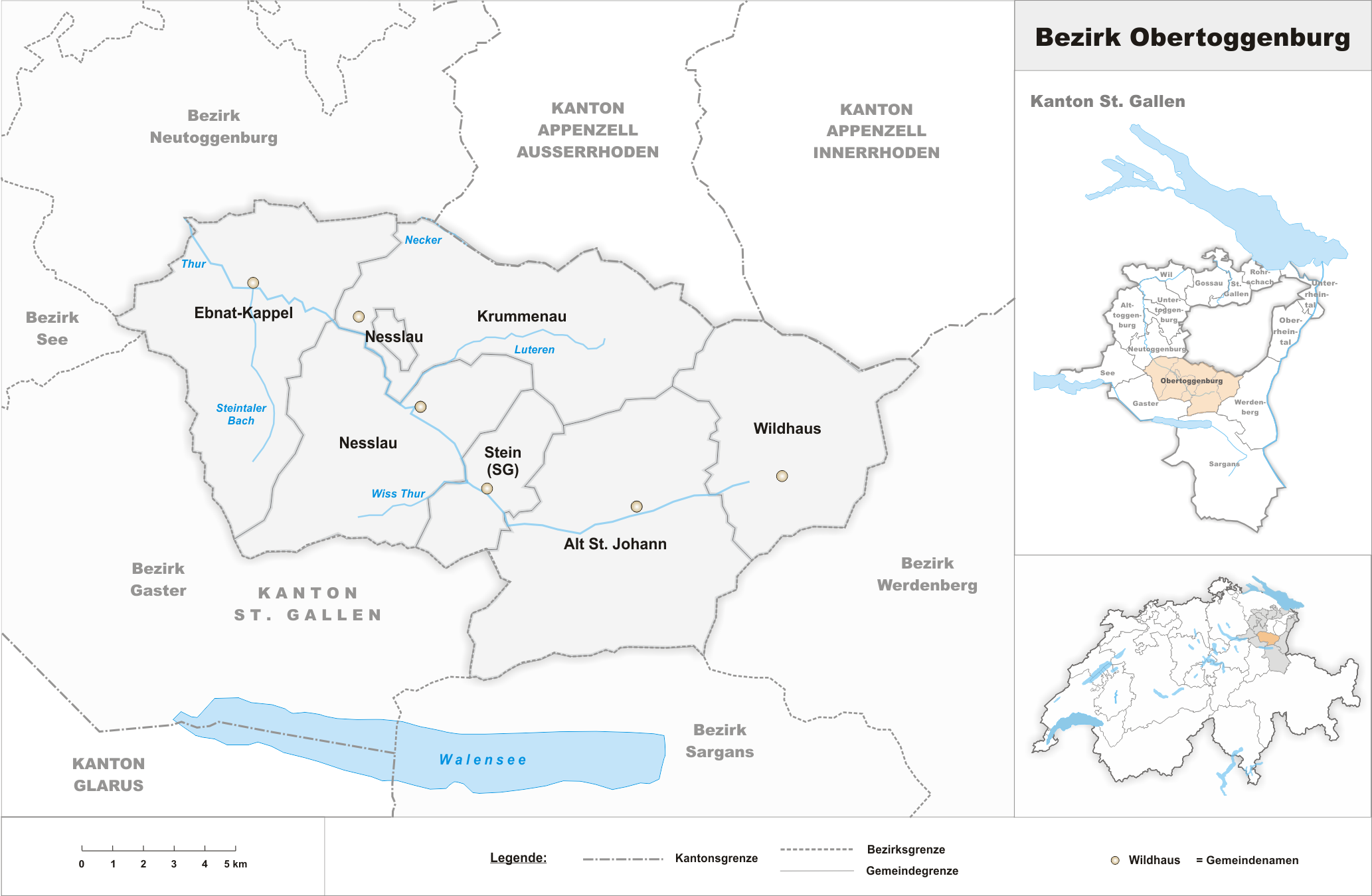
Municipalities in the Obertoggenburg District

Obertoggenburg District (German: Bezirk Obertoggenburg) is a former district of the canton of St. Gallen in Switzerland. It was created in 1803 resulting from a split of Toggenburg into Obertoggenburg and Untertoggenburg District. It was dissolved in 2003 when it merged back into Toggenburg.
