= Untertoggenburg District =

District of the canton of St. Gallen

Untertoggenburg District (German: Bezirk Untertoggenburg) is a former district of the canton of St. Gallen in Switzerland. It was created in 1803 resulting from a split of Toggenburg into Untertoggenburg and Obertoggenburg. It was dissolved in 2003 as its municipalities were distributed to the districts of Toggenburg and Wil.
