= Gaiserwald =

- Municipality
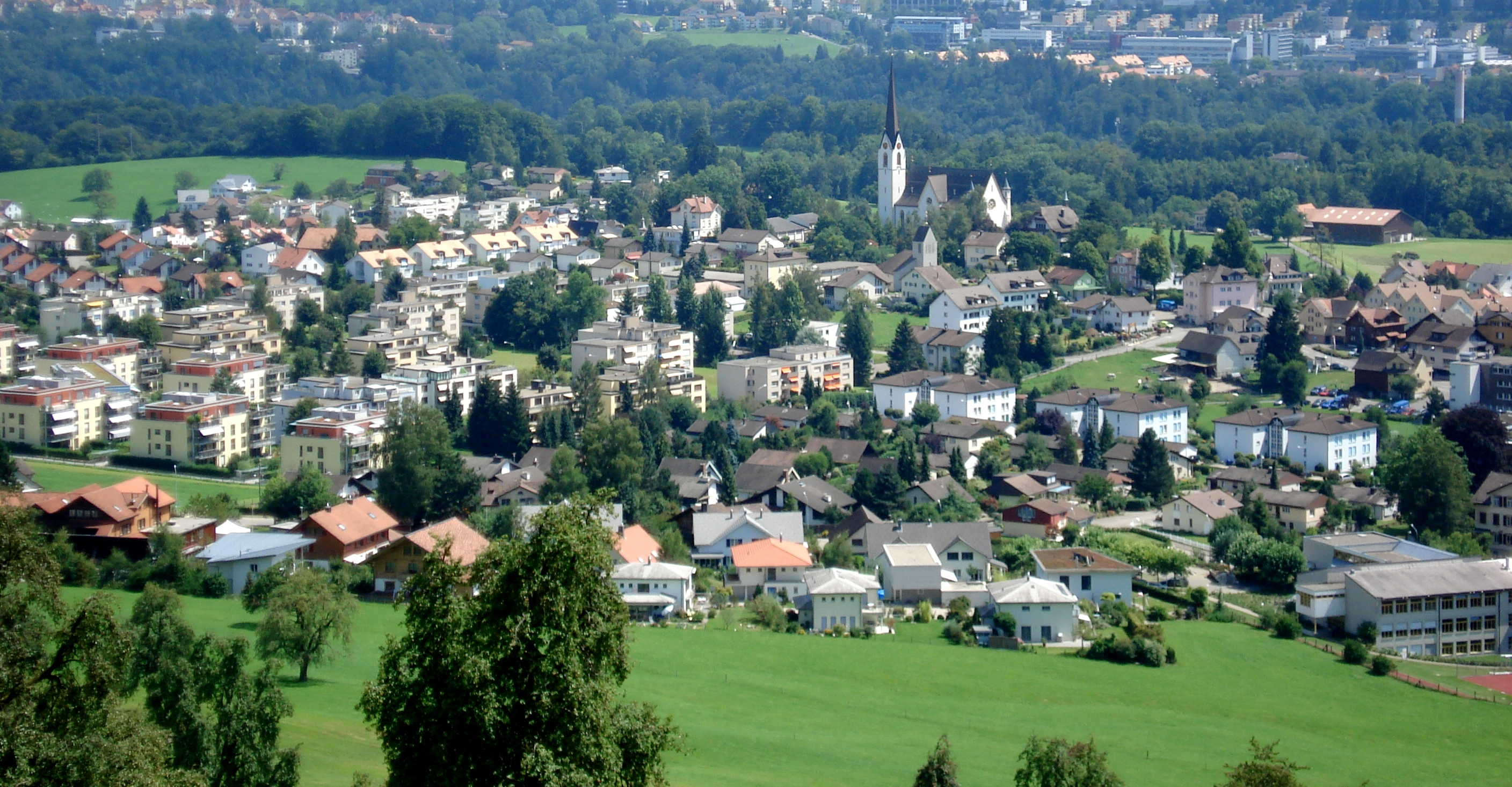

- Coat of arms
- Location of Gaiserwald
- Location within Switzerland Location within Canton of St. Gallen
- Coordinates: 47°25′N 9°19′E
- Country: Switzerland
- Canton: St. Gallen
- District: St. Gallen

Government
  - Mayor: Andreas Haltinner

Area
  - Total: 12.64 km^{2} (4.88 sq mi)
- Elevation: 650 m (2,130 ft)

Population (December 2020)
  - Total: 8,389
  - Density: 663.7/km^{2} (1,719/sq mi)
- Time zone: UTC+01:00 (CET)
  - Summer (DST): UTC+02:00 (CEST)
- Postal code: 9030
- SFOS number: 3442
- ISO 3166 code: CH-SG
- Surrounded by: Andwil, Gossau, St. Gallen, Waldkirch, Wittenbach
- Website: www.gaiserwald.ch

Gaiserwald is a municipality in the Wahlkreis (constituency) of St. Gallen in the canton of St. Gallen in Switzerland. The municipality consists of the villages of St. Josefen, Abtwil and Engelburg.

== History ==
Gaiserwald is first mentioned in 1282 as Gaiserwalt.

== Geography ==
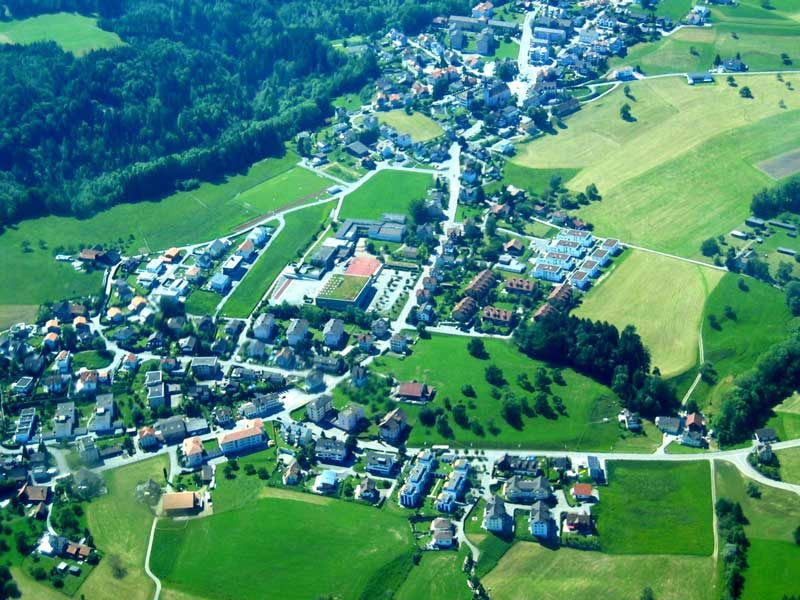
Engelburg village in Gaiserwald

Gaiserwald has an area, as of 2006, of 12.7 km^{2} (4.9 sq mi). Of this area, 49.8% is used for agricultural purposes, while 30.2% is forested. Of the rest of the land, 18.8% is settled (buildings or roads) and the remainder (1.2%) is non-productive (rivers or lakes).

The municipality is located in the St Gallen Wahlkreis and is part of the suburbs of St. Gallen. While there is no village of Gaiserwald, the municipality consists of the villages of St. Josefen, Abtwil and Engelburg.

== Coat of arms ==
The blazon of the municipal coat of arms is Argent a Pale wavy Azure between three Annulets in pale Gules in dexter and a Pine Tree eradicated of the same in sinister.

== Demographics ==
Gaiserwald has a population (as of 31 December 2020) of 8,389. As of 2007, about 12.1% of the population was made up of foreign nationals. Of the foreign population, (as of 2000), 148 are from Germany, 113 are from Italy, 284 are from ex-Yugoslavia, 57 are from Austria, 90 are from Turkey, and 170 are from another country. Over the last 10 years the population has grown at a rate of 9.4%. Most of the population (as of 2000) speaks German (93.4%), with Serbo-Croatian being second most common ( 1.4%) and Albanian being third ( 0.9%). Of the Swiss national languages (as of 2000), 7,003 speak German, 28 people speak French, 61 people speak Italian, and 10 people speak Romansh.

The age distribution, as of 2000, in Gaiserwald is; 881 children or 11.8% of the population are between 0 and 9 years old and 1,167 teenagers or 15.6% are between 10 and 19. Of the adult population, 823 people or 11.0% of the population are between 20 and 29 years old. 1,165 people or 15.5% are between 30 and 39, 1,236 people or 16.5% are between 40 and 49, and 1,060 people or 14.1% are between 50 and 59. The senior population distribution is 643 people or 8.6% of the population are between 60 and 69 years old, 362 people or 4.8% are between 70 and 79, there are 144 people or 1.9% who are between 80 and 89, and there are 14 people or 0.2% who are between 90 and 99.

In 2000 there were 805 persons (or 10.7% of the population) who were living alone in a private dwelling. There were 1,760 (or 23.5%) persons who were part of a couple (married or otherwise committed) without children, and 4,366 (or 58.3%) who were part of a couple with children. There were 408 (or 5.4%) people who lived in single parent home, while there are 33 persons who were adult children living with one or both parents, 19 persons who lived in a household made up of relatives, 28 who lived household made up of unrelated persons, and 76 who are either institutionalized or live in another type of collective housing.

In the 2007 federal election the most popular party was the SVP which received 31.6% of the vote. The next three most popular parties were the CVP (21.1%), the FDP (15.3%) and the SP (13.9%).

The entire Swiss population is generally well educated. In Gaiserwald about 79.1% of the population (between age 25–64) have completed either non-mandatory upper secondary education or additional higher education (either university or a Fachhochschule). Out of the total population in Gaiserwald, as of 2000, the highest education level completed by 1,299 people (17.3% of the population) was Primary, while 3,025 (40.4%) have completed Secondary, 1,085 (14.5%) have attended a Tertiary school, and 274 (3.7%) are not in school. The remainder did not answer this question.

The historical population is given in the following table:

year	population
1850	1,269
1900	2,508
1941	2,173
1950	2,396
1960	2,319
2000	7,495

== Heritage sites of national significance ==
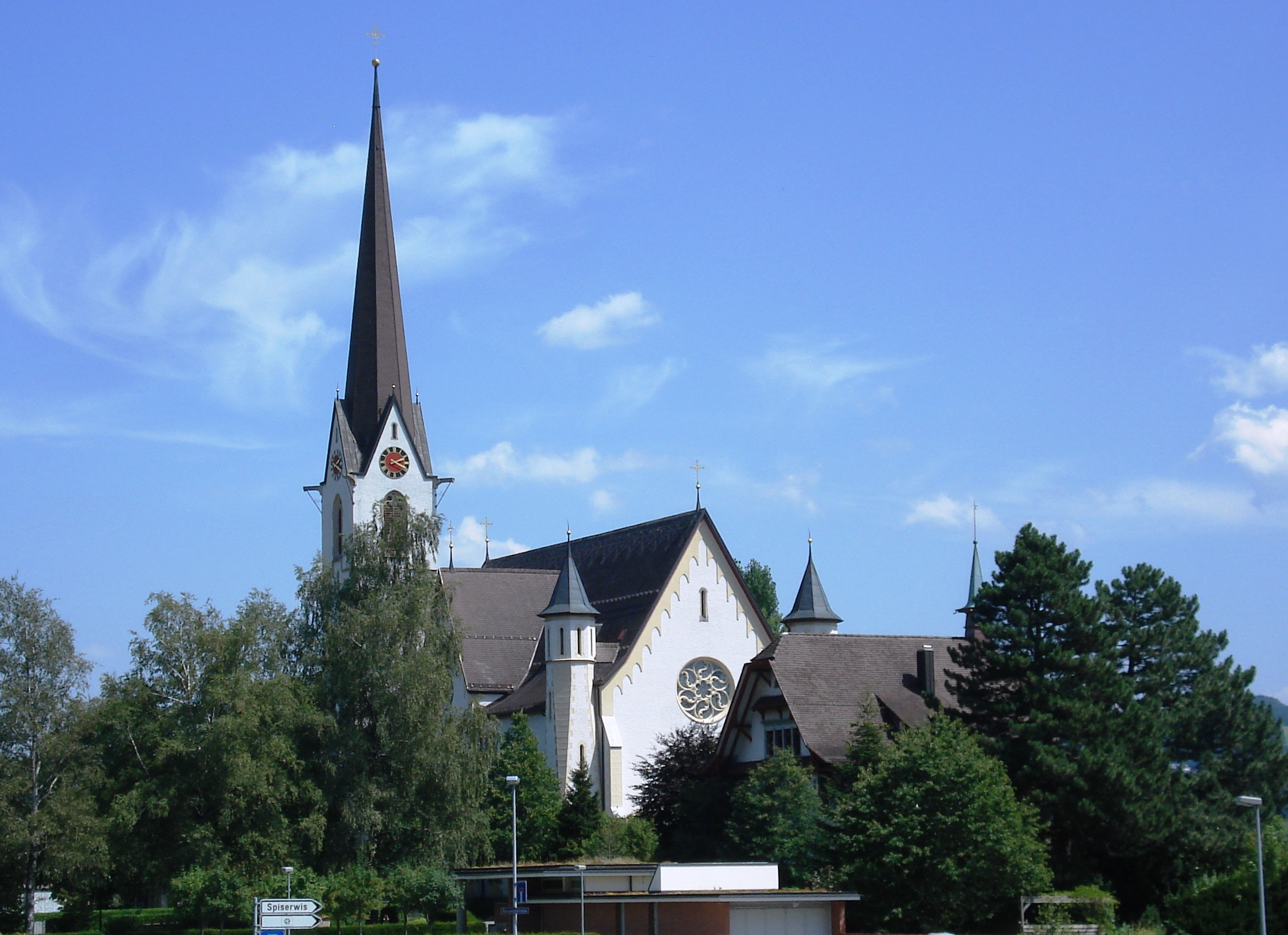
Church of St. Josef

The Catholic parish church of St. Josef is listed as a Swiss heritage site of national significance.

The church of St. Josef was built in 1904–05 in a Gothic Revival style by August Hardegger.

== Economy ==
As of 2007, Gaiserwald had an unemployment rate of 1.89%. As of 2005, there were 124 people employed in the primary economic sector and about 49 businesses involved in this sector. 427 people are employed in the secondary sector and there are 72 businesses in this sector. 1,229 people are employed in the tertiary sector, with 204 businesses in this sector.

As of October 2009 the average unemployment rate was 2.7%. There were 318 businesses in the municipality of which 75 were involved in the secondary sector of the economy while 204 were involved in the third.

As of 2000 there were 1,014 residents who worked in the municipality, while 3,023 residents worked outside Gaiserwald and 927 people commuted into the municipality for work.

== Religion ==
From the 2000 census, 3,772 or 50.3% are Roman Catholic, while 2,473 or 33.0% belonged to the Swiss Reformed Church. Of the rest of the population, there are 4 individuals (or about 0.05% of the population) who belong to the Christian Catholic faith, there are 112 individuals (or about 1.49% of the population) who belong to the Orthodox Church, and there are 201 individuals (or about 2.68% of the population) who belong to another Christian church. There are 6 individuals (or about 0.08% of the population) who are Jewish, and 249 (or about 3.32% of the population) who are Islamic. There are 32 individuals (or about 0.43% of the population) who belong to another church (not listed on the census), 484 (or about 6.46% of the population) belong to no church, are agnostic or atheist, and 162 individuals (or about 2.16% of the population) did not answer the question.
