= Oberrheintal District =

District in Switzerland

Oberrheintal District (German: Bezirk Oberrheintal) is a former district of the canton of St. Gallen in Switzerland. In 2003, it merged with the Unterrheintal District to form Rheintal.
