= See District, St. Gallen =

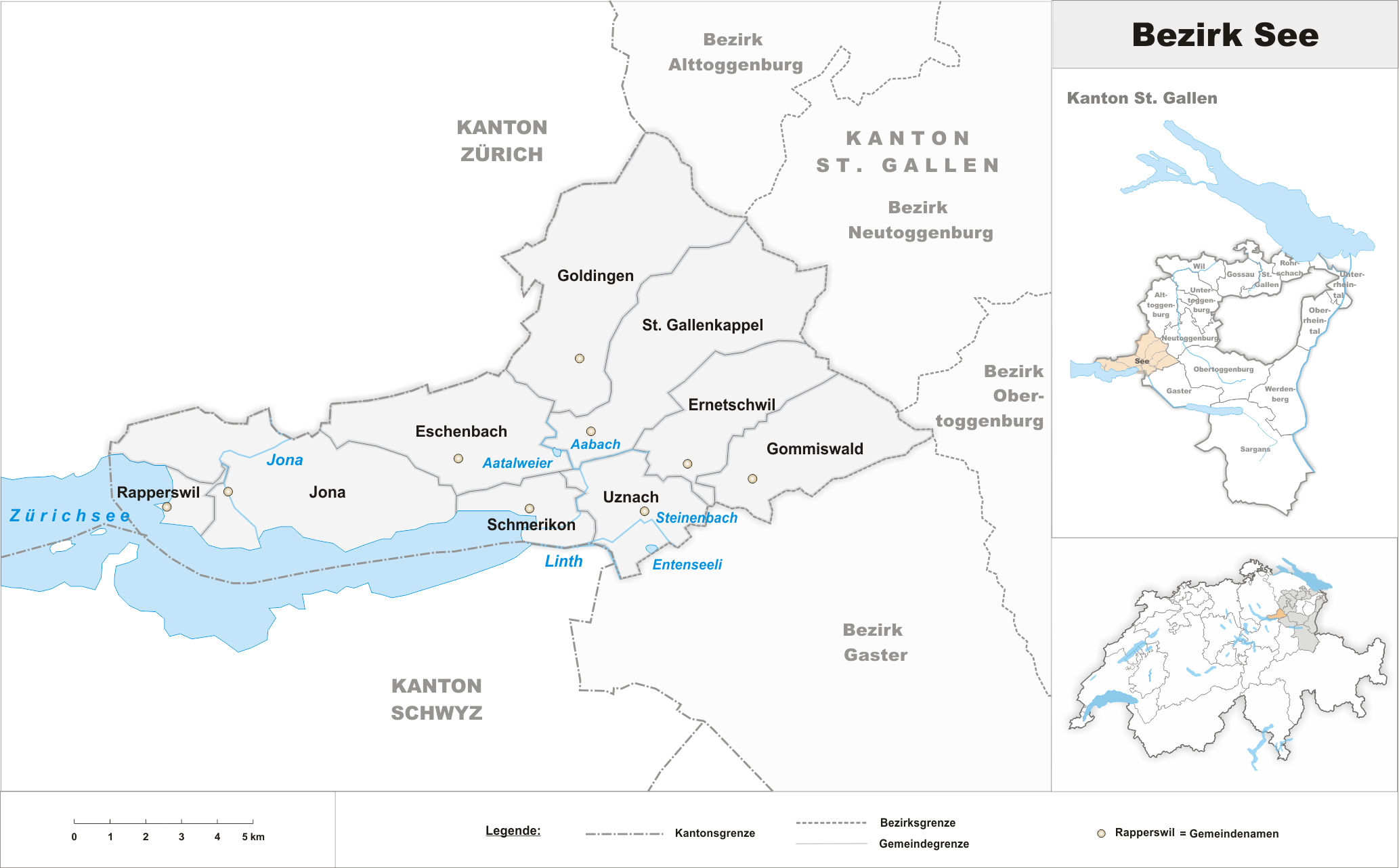
Municipalities in the district of See

See District (German: Bezirk See) is a former district of the canton of St. Gallen in Switzerland. The See and Gaster districts merged in 2003 to form the See-Gaster constituency.
