= Rorschach District =

District of the canton of St. Gallen

Rorschach District (German: Bezirk Rorschach) is a former district of the canton of St. Gallen in Switzerland. It was created in 1803 when the Canton of St. Gallen was founded. In 2003, it was dissolved as its municipalities were merged into the constituency of Rorschach, with the exception of Eggersriet, which became part of the constituency of St. Gallen.
