= Gossau, St. Gallen =

Gossau
- Municipality
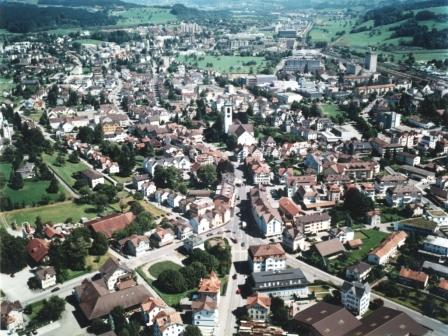

- Coat of arms
- Location of Gossau
- Location within Switzerland Location within Canton of St. Gallen
- Coordinates: 47°25′N 9°15′E
- Country: Switzerland
- Canton: St. Gallen
- District: St. Gallen

Government
  - Mayor: Alex Brühwiler

Area
  - Total: 27.51 km^{2} (10.62 sq mi)
- Elevation: 638 m (2,093 ft)

Population (December 2020)
  - Total: 17,990
  - Density: 653.9/km^{2} (1,694/sq mi)
- Time zone: UTC+01:00 (CET)
  - Summer (DST): UTC+02:00 (CEST)
- Postal code: 9200
- SFOS number: 3443
- ISO 3166 code: CH-SG
- Localities: Oberdorf, Mettendorf, Mooswies, Gerbhof
- Surrounded by: Andwil, Flawil, Gaiserwald, Herisau (AR), Niederbüren, Oberbüren, St. Gallen, Waldkirch
- Website: www.stadtgossau.ch

Gossau is a municipality in the Wahlkreis (constituency) of St. Gallen in the canton of St. Gallen in Switzerland.

== History ==
Gossau is first mentioned in 824 as Cozesaua.

== Geography ==
Aerial view by Walter Mittelholzer (1920)

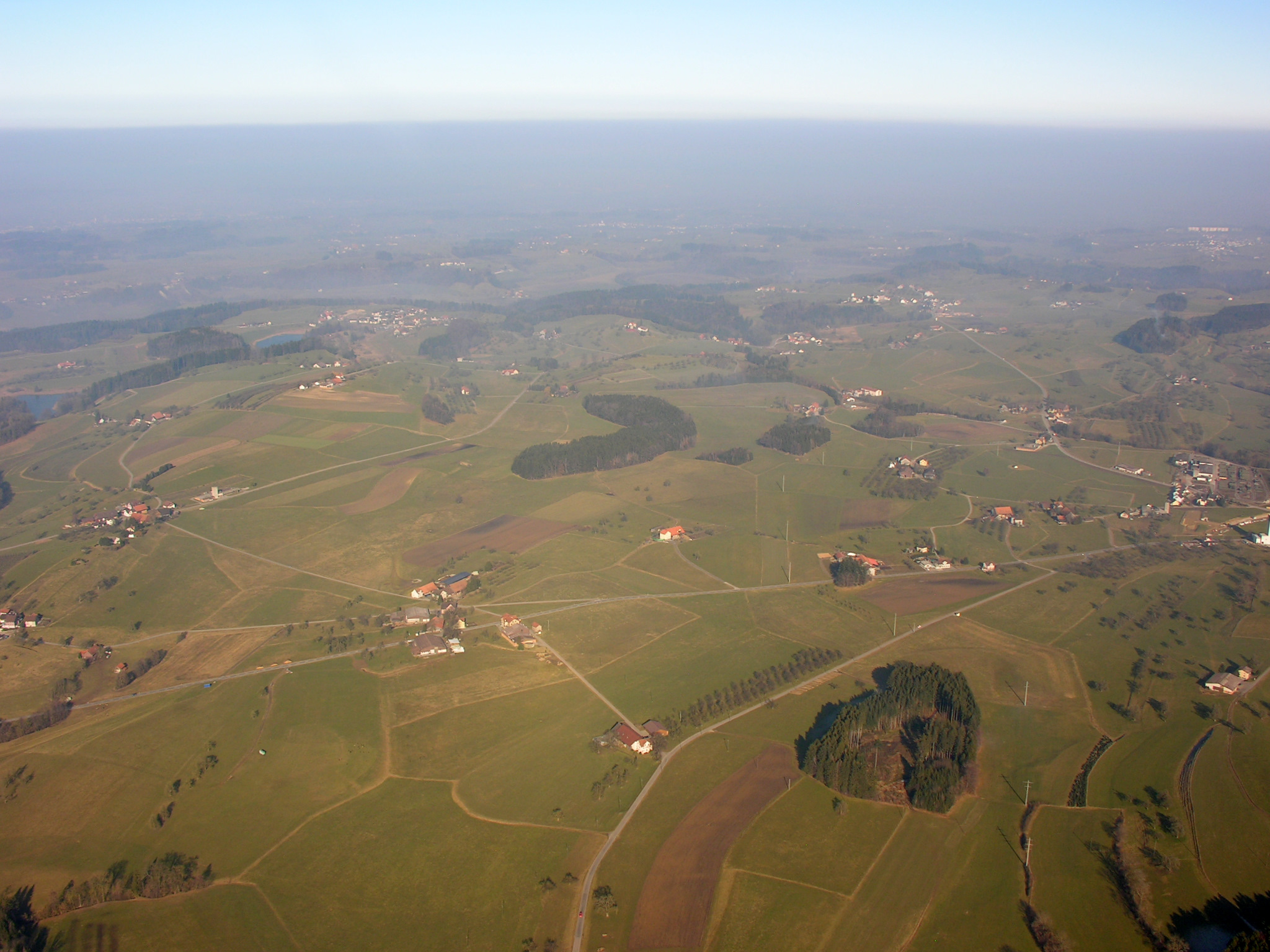
Aerial view above Gossau

Gossau has an area, as of 2006, of 27.5 km^{2} (10.6 sq mi). Of this area, 63% is used for agricultural purposes, while 16.3% is forested. Of the rest of the land, 20.1% is settled (buildings or roads) and the remainder (0.6%) is non-productive (rivers or lakes).

The municipality is located in the St Gallen Wahlkreis. Gossau is the largest municipality in the valley between the Glatt Valley and the Sitter River and lies on the intersection of the St. Gallen-Zürich and Thurgau-Appenzell roads. It consists of the village of Gossau with the sections of Mettendorf, Niederdorf, Oberdorf and Watt and the village of Arnegg as well as the hamlets of Albertschwil, Enggetschwil, Geretschwil, Hochschoren, Hueb, Matten, Neuchlen, Rain, Rüeggetschwil, Rüti, Wilen, Zinggenhueb, Erlen, Herzenwil and Stöcklen. In 1806 the hamlets of Arnegg (without Oberarnegg), Erlen, Fronackeren, Geretschwil, Herzenwil, Hölzli, Stöcklen, Wilen and Zinggenhueb came to Gossau from Andwil in exchange for Fronackeren, Hölzli, Landegg and Neuegg.

== Coat of arms ==
The blazon of the municipal coat of arms is Or a Cross bottony Gules issuant from jaws of a Wyvern passant Vert and in sinister chief a Bear rampant Sable langued and in his virility of the second.

== Demographics ==
Gossau has a population (as of 31 December 2020) of 17,990. As of 2007, about 18.4% of the population was made up of foreign nationals. Of the foreign population, (as of 2000), 168 are from Germany, 487 are from Italy, 1,574 are from ex-Yugoslavia, 105 are from Austria, 214 are from Turkey, and 496 are from another country. Over the last 10 years the population has grown at a rate of 3.9%. Most of the population (as of 2000) speaks German (88.4%), with Serbo-Croatian being second most common ( 4.2%) and Italian being third ( 2.1%). Of the Swiss national languages (as of 2000), 14,855 speak German, 48 people speak French, 349 people speak Italian, and 24 people speak Romansh.

The age distribution, as of 2000, in Gossau is; 2,007 children or 11.9% of the population are between 0 and 9 years old and 2,158 teenagers or 12.8% are between 10 and 19. Of the adult population, 2,304 people or 13.7% of the population are between 20 and 29 years old. 2,703 people or 16.1% are between 30 and 39, 2,401 people or 14.3% are between 40 and 49, and 2,125 people or 12.6% are between 50 and 59. The senior population distribution is 1,324 people or 7.9% of the population are between 60 and 69 years old, 1,074 people or 6.4% are between 70 and 79, there are 617 people or 3.7% who are between 80 and 89, and there are 90 people or 0.5% who are between 90 and 99, and 2 people or 0.0% who are 100 or more.

In 2000 there were 2,251 persons (or 13.4% of the population) who were living alone in a private dwelling. There were 3,870 (or 23.0%) persons who were part of a couple (married or otherwise committed) without children, and 9,167 (or 54.5%) who were part of a couple with children. There were 870 (or 5.2%) people who lived in single parent home, while there are 98 persons who were adult children living with one or both parents, 82 persons who lived in a household made up of relatives, 97 who lived household made up of unrelated persons, and 370 who are either institutionalized or live in another type of collective housing.

In the 2007 federal election the most popular party was the SVP which received 36.7% of the vote. The next three most popular parties were the CVP (26.3%), the SP (13.9%) and the FDP (12.2%).

The entire Swiss population is generally well educated. In Gossau about 68.9% of the population (between age 25–64) have completed either non-mandatory upper secondary education or additional higher education (either university or a Fachhochschule). Out of the total population in Gossau, as of 2000, the highest education level completed by 3,808 people (22.7% of the population) was Primary, while 6,416 (38.2%) have completed Secondary, 1,678 (10.0%) have attended a Tertiary school, and 670 (4.0%) are not in school. The remainder did not answer this question.

The historical population is given in the following table:

year	population
1837	2,649
1850	2,853
1900	6,055
1910	8,455
1941	7,512
1950	8,316
1970	12,793
2000	16,805

== Heritage sites of national significance ==
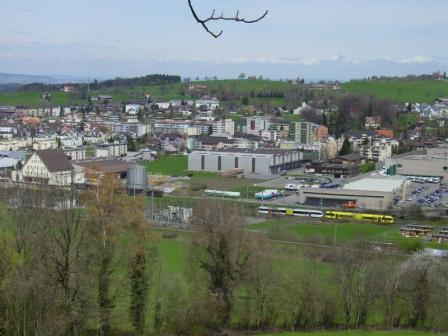
Gossau Industrial sector

The Former Rubberband Factory at Stadtbühlstrasse 12 is listed as a Swiss heritage site of national significance. Both the village of Gossau and the Kulturlandschaft Matten/Wilen/Zinggenhueb (Cultural region Matten/Wilen/Zinggenhueb), which is shared between Gossau and Andwil, are designated as part of the Inventory of Swiss Heritage Sites.

== Sights ==
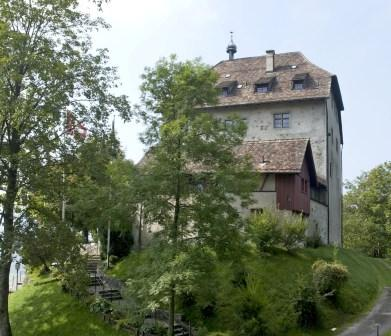
Castle Oberberg in Gossau

The Catholic parish church of St. Andreas was built in 1732 by Jakob Grubenmann. It was lengthened to the west and renovated in 1925. It is a single-nave church with a transept and an oval dome over the crossing. The Reformed church of Gossau was built in 1899–1900. Castle Oberberg is located east of Gossau. It was built in the 13th Century. During the Appenzell Wars (1401–1429) it was destroyed and rebuilt in the 15th Century. It is a late gothic castle, with a high medieval south west wall and a modern chapel.

== Economy ==
As of 2007, Gossau had an unemployment rate of 1.92%. As of 2005, there were 322 people employed in the primary economic sector and about 118 businesses involved in this sector. 4,104 people are employed in the secondary sector and there are 205 businesses in this sector. 6,539 people are employed in the tertiary sector, with 551 businesses in this sector.

As of October 2009 the average unemployment rate was 3.0%. There were 915 businesses in the municipality of which 201 were involved in the secondary sector of the economy while 604 were involved in the third.

As of 2000 there were 4,500 residents who worked in the municipality, while 4,514 residents worked outside Gossau and 6,318 people commuted into the municipality for work.

== Sport ==
FC Gossau is the municipality's football club.

== Religion ==
From the 2000 census, 9,608 or 57.2% are Roman Catholic, while 3,935 or 23.4% belonged to the Swiss Reformed Church. Of the rest of the population, there are 22 individuals (or about 0.13% of the population) who belong to the Christian Catholic faith, there are 943 individuals (or about 5.61% of the population) who belong to the Orthodox Church, and there are 286 individuals (or about 1.70% of the population) who belong to another Christian church. There is 1 individual who is Jewish, and 625 (or about 3.72% of the population) who are Islamic. There are 104 individuals (or about 0.62% of the population) who belong to another church (not listed on the census), 804 (or about 4.78% of the population) belong to no church, are agnostic or atheist, and 477 individuals (or about 2.84% of the population) did not answer the question.

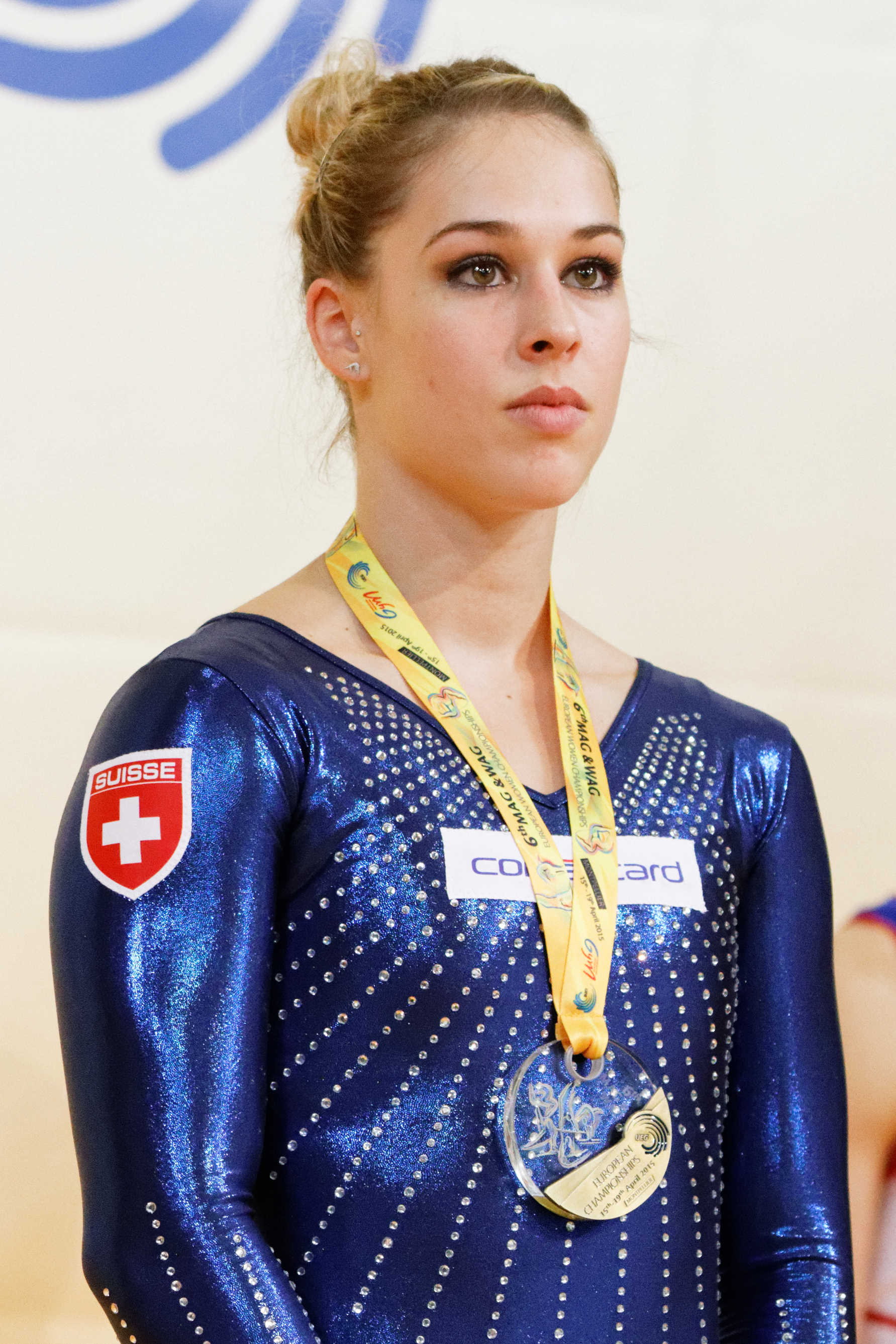
Giulia Steingruber, 2015

== Notable people ==
- Giulia Steingruber (born 1994 in Gossau), a Swiss artistic gymnast and bronze medalist on vault at the 2016 Summer Olympics

== See also ==
- Gossau SG railway station
