= St. Gallen (Wahlkreis) =

Coordinates: 47°25′35″N 9°22′34″E

St. Gallen Wahlkreis St. Gallen
- Constituency
- Country: Switzerland
- Canton: St. Gallen

Area
  - Total: 157.54 km^{2} (60.83 sq mi)

Population (December 2020)
  - Total: 122,903
  - Density: 780.14/km^{2} (2,020.5/sq mi)
- Time zone: UTC+1 (CET)
  - Summer (DST): UTC+2 (CEST)
- Municipalities: 9

St. Gallen is a constituency (Wahlkreis) in the canton of St. Gallen in Switzerland. The Wahlkreis (SFOS number 1721) was established on 10 June 2001 with an area of 157.54 km^{2} (60.83 sq mi). The Wahlkreis takes its name from the city of St. Gallen.

== Demographics ==
The St. Gallen region has a population of 122,903 (as of 31 December 2020).). Of the foreign population, (as of 2000), 2,980 are from Germany, 4,612 are from Italy, 9,971 are from ex-Yugoslavia, 1,094 are from Austria, 1,488 are from Turkey, and 5,544 are from another country. Of the Swiss national languages (as of 2000), 98,140 speak German, 717 people speak French, 3,333 people speak Italian, and 196 people speak Romansh.

The age distribution, as of 2000, in the region is; 11,875 children or 10.4% of the population are between 0 and 9 years old and 13,476 teenagers or 11.8% are between 10 and 19. Of the adult population, 17,682 people or 15.5% of the population are between 20 and 29 years old. 18,404 people or 16.1% are between 30 and 39, 15,610 people or 13.7% are between 40 and 49, and 13,893 people or 12.2% are between 50 and 59. The senior population distribution is 9,958 people or 8.7% of the population are between 60 and 69 years old, 8,060 people or 7.1% are between 70 and 79, there are 4,502 people or 3.9% who are between 80 and 89, and there are 833 people or 0.7% who are between 90 and 99, and 12 people who are 100 or more.

In 2000 there were 21,011 persons (or 18.4% of the population) who were living alone in a private dwelling. There were 26,593 (or 23.3%) persons who were part of a couple (married or otherwise committed) without children, and 51,578 (or 45.1%) who were part of a couple with children. There were 6,777 (or 5.9%) people who lived in single parent home, while there are 670 persons who were adult children living with one or both parents, 635 persons who lived in a household made up of relatives, 2,507 who lived household made up of unrelated persons, and 4,534 who are either institutionalised or live in another type of collective housing.

Out of the total population in the St.Gallen Wahlkreis, as of 2000, the highest education level completed by 23,795 people (20.8% of the population) was Primary, while 43,580 (38.1%) have completed Secondary, 14,970 (13.1%) have attended a Tertiary school, and 4,466 (3.9%) are not in school — the remainder did not answer this question.

== Economy ==
As of October 2009 the average unemployment rate was 3.9%.

== Religion ==
From the 2000 census, 55,165 or 48.3% are Roman Catholic, while 30,375 or 26.6% belonged to the Swiss Reformed Church. Of the rest of the population, there are 157 individuals (or about 0.14% of the population) who belong to the Christian Catholic faith, there are 4,747 individuals (or about 4.15% of the population) who belong to the Orthodox Church, and there are 2,421 individuals (or about 2.12% of the population) who belong to another Christian church. There are 141 individuals (or about 0.12% of the population) who are Jewish, and 6,339 (or about 5.55% of the population) who are Islamic. There are 1,072 individuals (or about 0.94% of the population) who belong to another church (not listed on the census), 9,646 (or about 8.44% of the population) belong to no church, are agnostic or atheist, and 4,242 individuals (or about 3.71% of the population) did not answer the question.

== Municipalities ==
Coat of arms	Municipality	Population (31 December 2020)	Area in km²	SFOS number
Andwil	Andwil	2,058	6.29	3441
Eggersriet	Eggersriet	2,334	8.82	3212
Gaiserwald	Gaiserwald	8,389	12.64	3442
Gossau	Gossau	17,990	27.51	3443
Häggenschwil	Häggenschwil	1,389	9.10	3201
Muolen	Muolen	1,224	10.30	3202
St. Gallen	St. Gallen	76,213	39.41	3203
Waldkirch	Waldkirch	3,559	31.25	3444
Wittenbach	Wittenbach	9,747	12.22	3204
	Total (9)	122,903	157.54	1721

== See also ==
- Municipalities of the canton of St. Gallen
