= Karl Friedrich Moest =

German sculptor

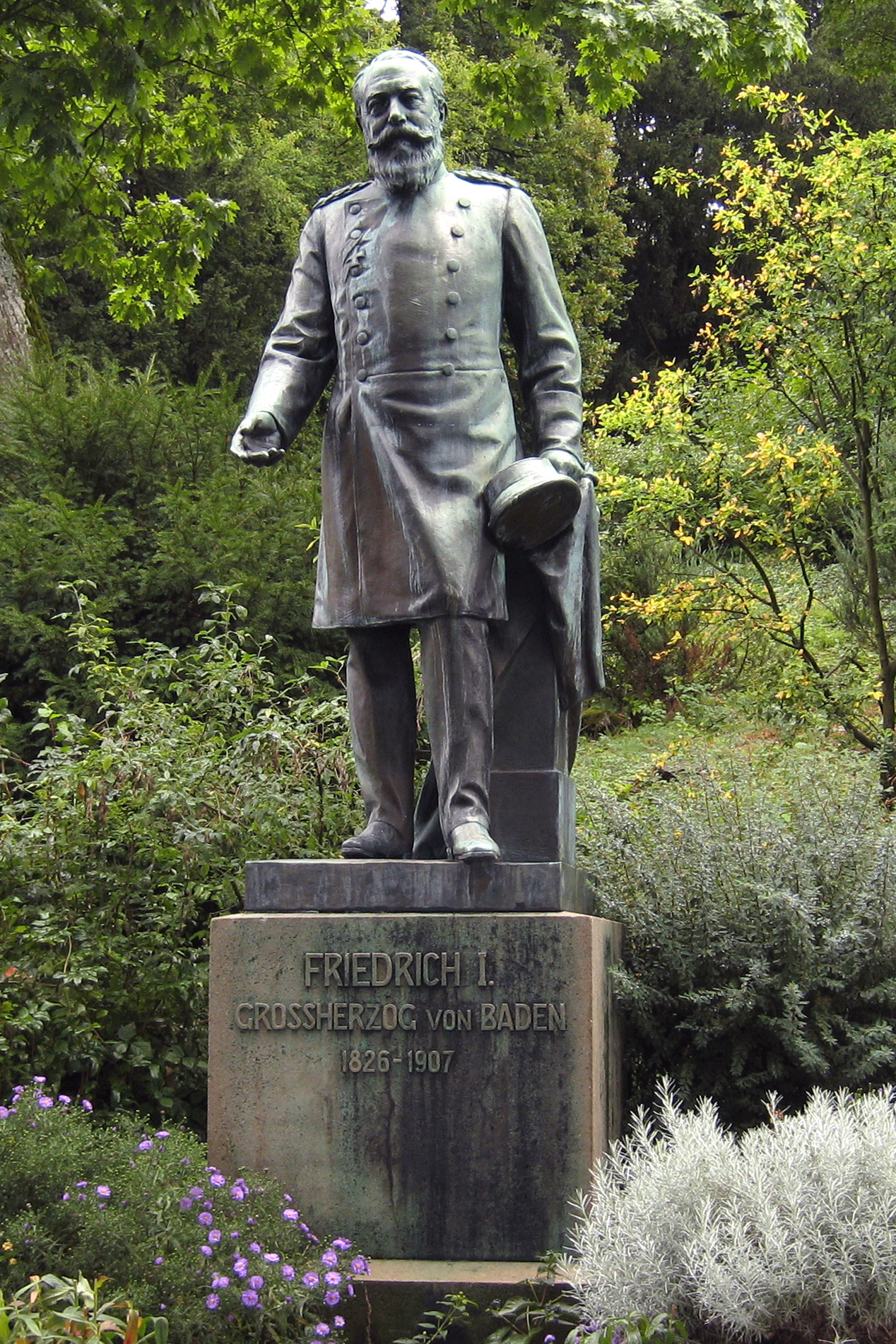
- Memorial to Frederick I of Baden in Badenweiler, by Carl Friedrich Moest
- Born: 26 March 1838; Gernsbach, Grand Duchy of Baden
- Died: 14 August 1923 (aged 85); Karlsruhe, Republic of Baden, Germany
- Occupation: Sculptor
- Spouse: Louise Himmel (1839-)
- Children: Friedrich Moest (1866-1948); Hermann Moest (1868-1945); Rudolf Moest (1872-1919)

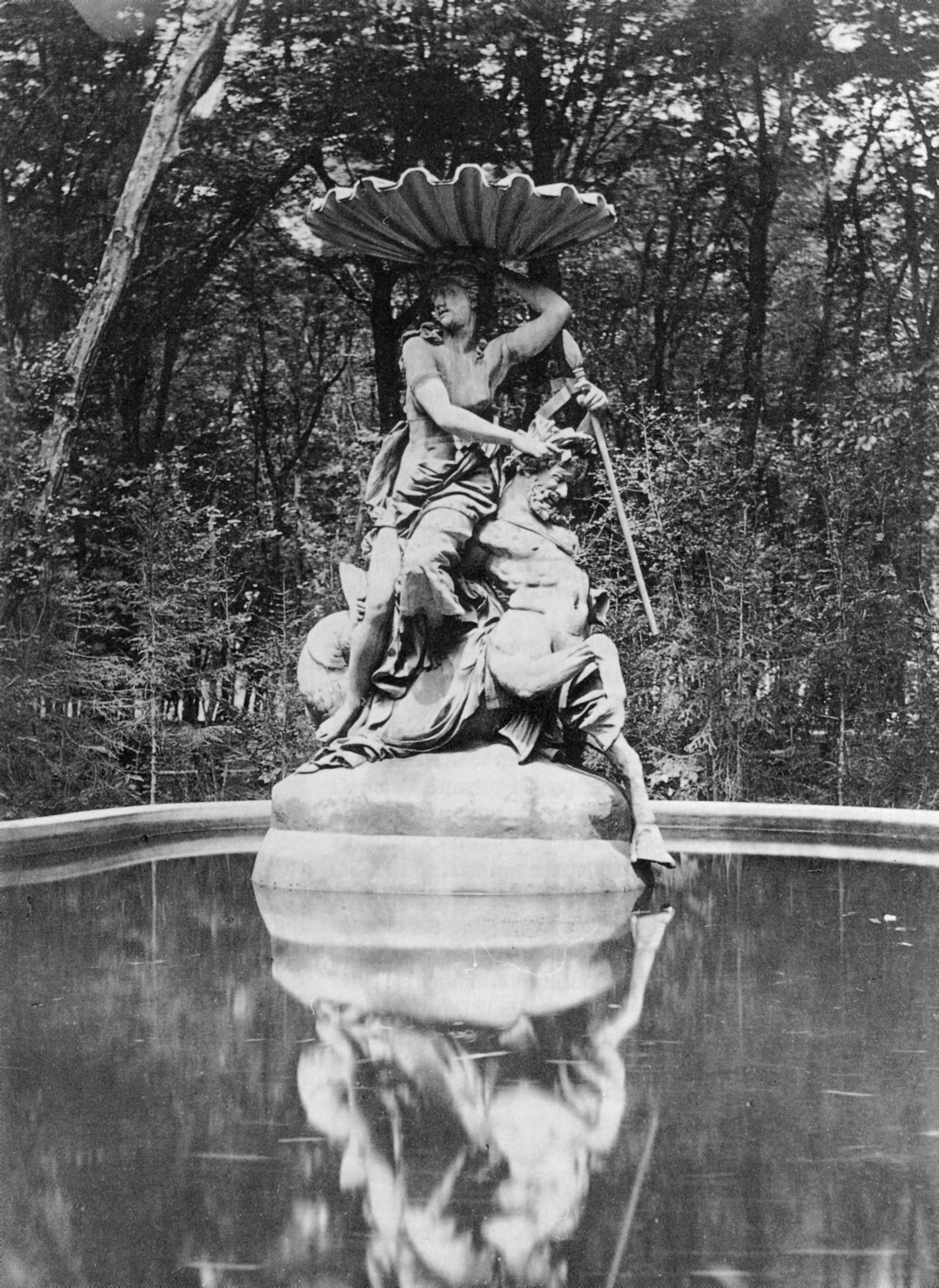
"Galatea" fountain in Karlsruhe. photographed before 1900

Karl Friedrich Moest (also Carl Friedrich Moest: 26 March 1838 - 14 August 1923) was a German sculptor.

== Life ==
Moest was born in Gernsbach, a short distance to the east of Baden-Baden. He learned drawing skills, etching on copper and steel, how to use a chisel, marquetry and wood carving from his father, who was a Gunsmith. His first employment was in Pforzheim where he worked in a silverware factory as a modeller and engraver. Later, he was making molds for the decorative coverings attached to the top parts of corks on bottles of expensive wine. For several years he worked intensively in order to be able to finance his higher education, but this appears to have exhausted him, and two months after enrolling at the Technical University of Munich he succumbed to typhoid. He returned to his home town to convalesce and then enrolled at the nearby Karlsruhe Technical Academy to study machine construction, chemistry and architecture. After half a year he decided for a more artistic focus, studying at the city's Kunstgewerbeschule, a predecessor of the Academy of Fine Arts, Karlsruhe, where he was taught by Adolf Des Coudres and Johann Wilhelm Schirmer. Another of his teachers was the sculptor Hans Baur (1829-1897), who had rented a studio of his own in the academy's new building in the Bismarck Street ("Bismarckstraße") where he taught both Moest and Gustav von Kreß.

His first sculptures were portrait busts, including one of the artist August von Bayer (1803-1875), one of the minister Wilhelm Lamey (1854-1910) and another of Franz von Roggenbach (1825-1907). His teacher, Carl Johann Steinhäuser, obtained him a contract to produce (under Steinhäuser's supervision) a memorial for Heinrich Hübsch, an architect and local chief building inspector, who had died in 1863. From 1863 Moest was himself employed as a drawing teacher at the Kunstgewerbeschule Karlsruhe. After producing more portrait busts and the large sandstone caryatid for the Mannheim city hall he undertook, in 1864, an extensive study tour of Italy which enabled him to study, in particular, the masterpieces of Michelangelo, Canova and Thorwaldsen. After getting back he produced more portrait busts. His subjects included Johann Wilhelm Schirmer, Georg Gottfried Gervinus, Wilhelm Lamey, the Princess of Wied. It was also around this time that he produced his first larger work, the group composition "Minerva with Trade and Industry", on top of the main railway bridge across the Rhine in Mannheim (later destroyed in the Second World War). This built up his reputation and further important commissions followed. In 1870 he applied to visit London where he war able to study the ancient sculptures and plaster castings at the British Museum and the Victoria and Albert Museum.

From 1867 he taught more regularly at Kunstgewerbeschule in Karlsruhe, becoming a professor there in 1872. He was also employed by Dyckerhoff & Widman, a building supplies company which specialised in architectural embellishments and molded cement sculptures (among other things). One of the company's more visible contracts was with the Karlsruhe city council for the construction of its "Galatea" fountain. Moest carried out the work. (The fountain today - 2017 - adorns the front garden of the Federal Court of Justice building.) In 1879 Moest resigned from his teaching work at the Fine Arts Academy. Invited by Moest to choose between giving him a more suitable salary or accepting his resignation, the institution's director, Gustav Kachel (1843-1882), chose his resignation. Moest was succeeded at the academy by Adolf Heer.

In 1890 he submitted a design for a memorial to the recently deceased emperor. His submission came third and was then disqualified because, it was recorded, it used the "wrong" scale. In the end it was Adolf Heer whose design won that competition. Moest had better luck with the competition for a Karlsruhe Bismarck Memorial. The initial competition was concluded without a winner being declared, but it was then rerun and won by Fridolin Dietsche. However, Dietsche was a young man, and the judges gave the commission to second placed Karl Friedrich Moest (who had submitted three different proposals) because, it was reported, they believed that Dietsche would have many more opportunities to present his work. Ironically, Dietsche predeceased Moest who lived to an old age.

== Family ==
On 26 May 1868 Moest married Louise Himmel in Bruchsal. There were at least three recorded sons:

- Friedrich Moest, actor (28 July 1866 - 25 January 1948)
- Hermann Moest, sculptor (5 December 1868 - 10 December 1945)
- Rudolf Moest, singer (22 April 1872 - 28 April 1919)
