= A German Requiem (Brahms) =

Work by Johannes Brahms

Ein deutsches Requiem A German Requiem
- Choral composition by Johannes Brahms
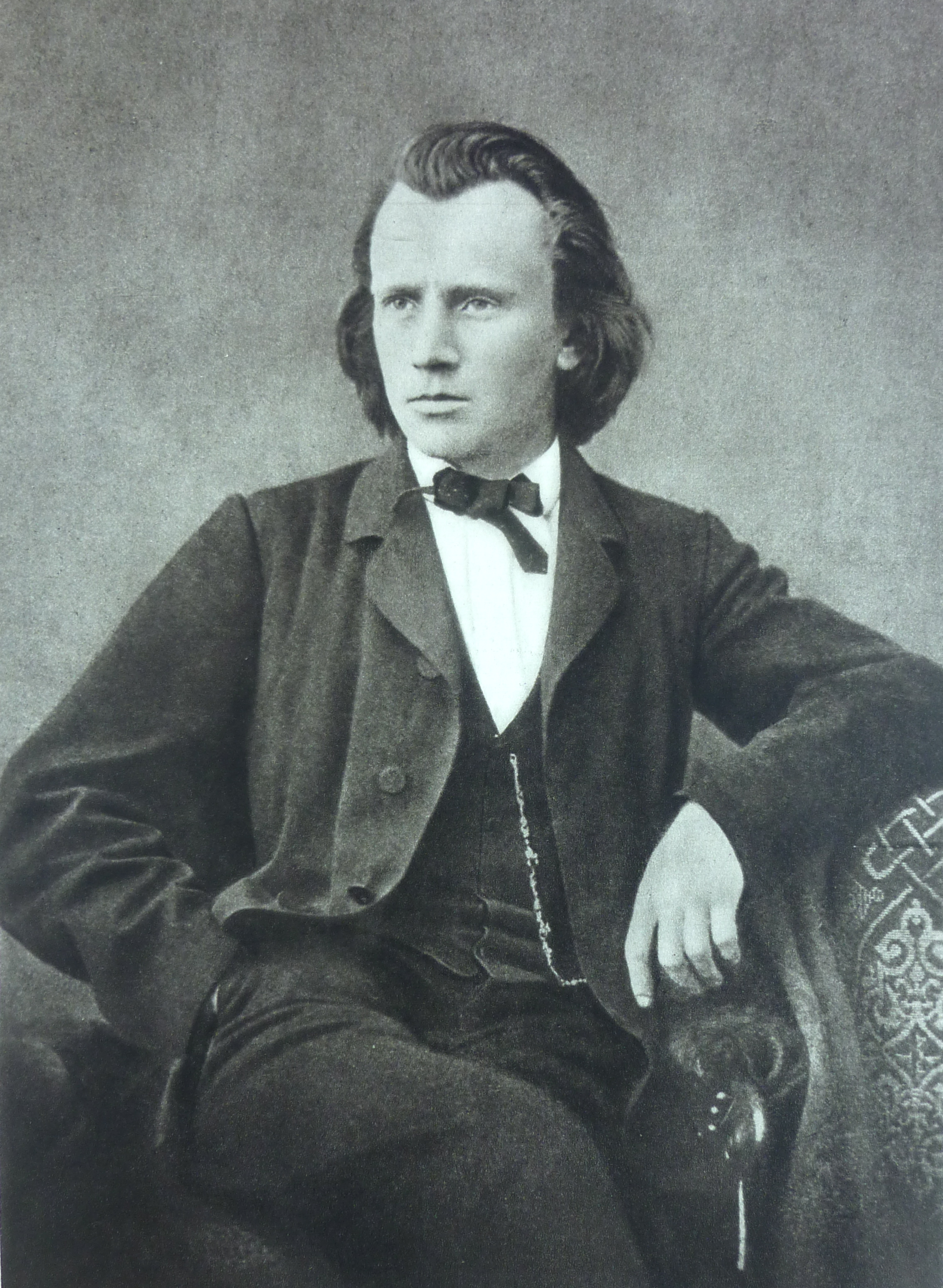
- The composer c. 1866
- English: A German Requiem, to Words of the Holy Scriptures
- Full title: Ein deutsches Requiem, nach Worten der heiligen Schrift
- Opus: 45
- Text: from the Luther Bible
- Language: German
- Composed: 1865–1868
- Movements: seven
- Scoring: soprano; baritone; mixed choir; orchestra

A German Requiem, to Words of the Holy Scriptures, Op. 45 (German: Ein deutsches Requiem, nach Worten der heiligen Schrift) by Johannes Brahms, is a large-scale work for chorus, orchestra, and soprano and baritone soloists, composed between 1865 and 1868. It comprises seven movements, which together last 65 to 80 minutes, making this work both Brahms's longest composition and largest-ensemble work. A German Requiem is sacred but non-liturgical, and unlike a long tradition of the Latin Requiem, A German Requiem, as its title states, is set in the German language.

== History ==
Brahms's mother died in February 1865, a loss that caused him much grief and may well have inspired Ein deutsches Requiem. Brahms's lingering feelings over Robert Schumann's death in July 1856 may also have been a motivation, though his reticence about such matters makes this uncertain.

His original conception was for a work of six movements; according to their eventual places in the final version, these were movements I–IV and VI–VII. By the end of April 1865, Brahms had completed the first, second, and fourth movements. The second movement used some previously abandoned musical material written in 1854, the year of Schumann's mental collapse and attempted suicide, and of Brahms's move to Düsseldorf to assist Clara Schumann and her young children.

Brahms completed all but what is now the fifth movement by August 1866. Johann Herbeck conducted the first three movements in Vienna on 1 December 1867. This partial premiere went poorly due to a misunderstanding in the timpanist's score. Sections marked as fp (loud, then soft) were played as f (loud) or ff (very loud), essentially drowning out the rest of the ensemble in the fugal section of the third movement. The first performance of the six movements premiered in the Bremen Cathedral six months later on Good Friday, 10 April 1868, with Brahms conducting and Julius Stockhausen as the baritone soloist. The performance was a great success and marked a turning point in Brahms's career.

In May 1868 Brahms composed an additional movement, which became the fifth movement within the final work. The new movement, which was scored for soprano soloist and choir, was first sung in Zürich on 12 September 1868 by Ida Suter-Weber, with Friedrich Hegar conducting the Tonhalle Orchester Zürich. The final, seven-movement version of A German Requiem was premiered in Leipzig on 18 February 1869 with Carl Reinecke conducting the Gewandhaus Orchestra and Chorus, and soloists Emilie Bellingrath-Wagner and Franz Krückl.

== Text ==
Brahms assembled the libretto himself. In contrast to the traditional Roman Catholic Requiem Mass, which employs a standardized text in Latin, the text is derived from the German Luther Bible.

Brahms's first known use of the title Ein deutsches Requiem was in an 1865 letter to Clara Schumann in which he wrote that he intended the piece to be "eine Art deutsches Requiem" (a sort of German Requiem). Brahms was quite moved when he found out years later that Robert Schumann had planned a work of the same name. German refers primarily to the language rather than the intended audience. Brahms told Carl Martin Reinthaler, director of music at the Bremen Cathedral, that he would have gladly called the work "Ein menschliches Requiem" (A human Requiem).

Although the Requiem Mass in the Roman Catholic liturgy begins with prayers for the dead ("Grant them eternal rest, O Lord"), A German Requiem focuses on the living, beginning with the text "Blessed are they that mourn, for they shall be comforted." from the Beatitudes. This theme—transition from anxiety to comfort—recurs in all the following movements except movements IV and VII, the central one and the final one. Although the idea of the Lord is the source of the comfort, the sympathetic humanism persists through the work.

Brahms purposely omitted Christian dogma. In his correspondence with Carl Reinthaler, when Reinthaler expressed concern over this, Brahms refused to add references to "the redeeming death of the Lord", as Reinthaler described it, such as John 3:16. In the Bremen performance of the piece, Reinthaler took the liberty of inserting the aria "I know that my Redeemer liveth" from Handel's Messiah to satisfy the clergy.

== Instrumentation ==
In addition to soprano and baritone soloists and mixed chorus, A German Requiem is scored for:

- woodwind: piccolo, 2 flutes, 2 oboes, 2 clarinets, 2 bassoons and contrabassoon (ad libitum)
- brass: 4 horns, 2 trumpets, 3 trombones, tuba
- percussion: timpani
- strings and harp (one part, preferably doubled)
- organ (ad libitum)

== Structure ==
Since Brahms inserted the fifth movement, the work shows symmetry around the fourth movement, which describes the "lovely dwellings" of the Lord. Movements I and VII begin "Selig sind" (Blessed are), taken from the Beatitudes of the Sermon on the Mount in I, from Revelation in VII. These two slow movements also share musical elements, especially in their ending. Movements II and VI are both dramatic, II dealing with the transient nature of life, VI with the resurrection of the dead, told as a secret about a change. Movements III and V are begun by a solo voice. In the third movement, the baritone requests "Herr, lehre doch mich" ("Lord, teach me"); the choir repeats his words several times, making the personal prayer more general. In the fifth movement, the soprano and chorus sing different text, corresponding to each other. As opposed to Baroque oratorios, the soloists do not sing any arias, but are part of the structure of the movements. Almost all movements, with the exception of IV and VII, connect different Bible verses, which lead from suffering and mourning to consolation. The last word of the work is the same as the first: "selig" (blessed).

=== Movements ===
The following table is organized first by movement, then within a movement by Bible quotation (where appropriate), which generally also causes a change in mood, expressed by tempo, key and orchestration. The title of each movement is bolded. The choir is in four parts, with the exception of a few chords. The choir is not especially mentioned in the table because it is present throughout the work. The translation is close to the original. Links to the King James Version of the Bible are supplied. Brahms marked some sections in German for tempo and character, trying to be more precise than the common Italian tempo markings.

| Title | Solo | Key | Tempo | Time | Source | Translation |
| I | | | | | | |
|---|---|---|---|---|---|---|
| **Selig sind, die da Leid tragen** | | F major | Ziemlich langsam und mit Ausdruck (Rather slow and with expression) | common time | Matthew 5:4 | Blessed are they who bear suffering |
| Die mit Tränen säen, werden mit Freuden ernten | | D♭ major | | | Psalm 126:5–6 | They that sow in tears shall reap in joy |
| Selig sind, die da Leid tragen | | F major | | | | Blessed are they who bear suffering |
| II | | | | | | |
| **Denn alles Fleisch, es ist wie Gras** | | B♭ minor | Langsam, marschmäßig (Slow, like a march) | 3/4 | 1 Peter 1:24 | For all flesh, it is as grass |
| So seid nun geduldig | | G♭ major | Etwas bewegter (A bit more lively) | | James 5:7 | So be patient |
| Denn alles Fleisch, es ist wie Gras | | B♭ minor | Tempo I | | | For all flesh, it is as grass |
| Aber des Herrn Wort bleibet in Ewigkeit | | B♭ major | Un poco sostenuto | | 1 Peter 1:25 | But the Lord's word remains forever |
| Die Erlöseten des Herrn werden wiederkommen | | | Allegro non troppo | common time | Isaiah 35:10 | The ransomed of the Lord shall return |
| Freude, ewige Freude | | | Tranquillo | | | Joy, eternal joy |
| III | | | | | | |
| **Herr, lehre doch mich** | Baritone | D minor | Andante moderato | common time | Psalm 39:4 | Lord, teach me |
| Ach, wie gar nichts | Baritone | | | 3/2 | Psalm 39:5–6 | Ah, how in vain |
| Ich hoffe auf dich | | D major | | | Psalm 39:7 | My hope is in you |
| Der Gerechten Seelen sind in Gottes Hand | | | | 4/2 | Wisdom of Solomon 3:1 | The souls of the righteous are in the hand of God |
| IV | | | | | | |
| **Wie lieblich sind deine Wohnungen** | | E♭ major | Mäßig bewegt (Moderately lively) | 3/4 | Psalm 84:1,2,4 | How lovely are thy dwellings |
| V | | | | | | |
| **Ihr habt nun Traurigkeit** | Soprano | G major | Langsam (Slow) | common time | John 16:22 | You now have sadness |
| Ich will euch trösten | | | | | Isaiah 66:13 | I will comfort you |
| Sehet mich an | Soprano | B♭ major | | | Sirach 51:27 | Look at me |
| Ich will euch trösten | | | | | | I will comfort you |
| Ihr habt nun Traurigkeit | Soprano | | | | | You now have sadness |
| Ich will euch trösten | | G major | | | | I will comfort you |
| VI | | | | | | |
| **Denn wir haben hie keine bleibende Statt** | | C minor | Andante | common time | Hebrews 13:14 | For here we have no lasting place |
| Siehe, ich sage euch ein Geheimnis | Baritone | F♯ minor | | | 1 Corinthians 15:51–52 | Behold, I tell you a mystery |
| Denn es wird die Posaune schallen | | C minor | Vivace | 3/4 | 1 Corinthians 15:52 | For the trumpet will sound |
| Dann wird erfüllet werden | Baritone | | | | 1 Corinthians 15:54 | Then shall be fulfilled |
| Der Tod ist verschlungen in den Sieg | | | | | 1 Corinthians 15:54–55 | Death is swallowed up in victory |
| Herr, du bist würdig | | C major | Allegro | 4/2 | Revelation 4:11 | Lord, you are worthy |
| VII | | | | | | |
| **Selig sind die Toten** | | F major | Feierlich (Solemn) | common time | Revelation 14:13 | Blessed are the dead |
| Ja, der Geist spricht, daß sie ruhen | | A major | | | | Yea, the Spirit speaks that they rest |
| Selig sind die Toten | | F major | | | | Blessed are the dead |

== Composition ==
Notable orchestration devices include the first movement's lack of violins, the use of a piccolo, clarinets, one pair of horns, trumpets, a tuba, and timpani throughout the work, as well as the use of harps at the close of both the first and seventh movements, most striking in the latter because at that point they have not played since the middle of the second movement.

A German Requiem is unified compositionally by a three-note motif of a leap of a major third, usually followed by a half-step in the same direction. The first exposed choral entry presents the motif in the soprano voice (F–A–B♭). This motif pervades every movement and much of the thematic material in the piece.

== Critical reception ==
Most critics have commented on the high level of craftsmanship displayed in the work, and have appreciated its quasi-Classical structures (e.g. the second, third, and sixth movements have fugues at their climax). But not all critics responded favourably to the work. George Bernard Shaw, an avowed Wagnerite, wrote that "it could only have come from the establishment of a first-class undertaker." Some commentators have also been puzzled by its lack of overt Christian content, though it seems clear that for Brahms this was a humanist rather than a Christian work.

== Versions and arrangements ==
In 1866 Brahms made an arrangement for piano solo of the six-movement version of the Requiem, which he revealed to Clara Schumann at Christmas of that year.

Brahms prepared an alternative version of the full seven-movement work to be performed with piano duet accompaniment, making it an acceptable substitute accompaniment for choir and soloists in circumstances where a full orchestra is unavailable. The vocal parts can also be omitted, suggesting that it was also intended as a self-contained version probably for at-home use. The alternative version was used, sung in English, for the first complete British performance of the Requiem on 10 July 1871 at 35 Wimpole Street, London, the home of Sir Henry Thompson and his wife, the pianist Kate Loder (Lady Thompson). The pianists were Kate Loder and Cipriani Potter. This piano-duet accompaniment version of the Requiem has become known as the "London Version" (German: Londoner Fassung).

== In other works ==
A German Requiem inspired the titles of Jorge Luis Borges' 1949 short story "Deutsches Requiem" and Philip Kerr's 1991 novel A German Requiem.

The start of the piece's second movement, "Denn alles Fleisch, es ist wie Gras" ("For all flesh, is as grass"), is used in the opening credits of the BBC documentary film series The Nazis: A Warning from History, with various sections of this part of the movement being used for the closing credits.
