= Rudolf Moest =

German bass and baritone

Rudolf Moest (22 April 1872 – 28 April 1919) was a German operatic bass and baritone.

== Life ==
Moest was born in Karlsruhe the son of the sculptor Karl Friedrich Moest. Already at an early age, people became aware of his voice, and it was first Carl Speigler and later Fritz Plank who put him on stage. He took lessons from Carl Hermann and Franz Krückl and started his stage career in 1882 in Strasbourg, where he made his debut as "Ruggiero" in La Juive and stayed there four years. In 1896, he joined the association of the court theatre in Hanover, of which he was a member until 1914.

In 1900, he made a guest appearance at the Oper Frankfurt in June and at the Hoftheater in Vienna in November. In 1909, he was König Heinrich in Lohengrin and Titurel in Parsifal at the Bayreuth Festival. In 1914, he went to the court opera in Vienna, where he had great success as "Hans Sachs" in Die Meistersinger. Guest performances brought him to the court theatre in Karlsruhe (1902), to the Staatsoper Unter den Linden (1903-1910), to Cologne (1905-1908), then to Dresden (1906), Munich and Stuttgart, to the German theatre in Prague (1907, 1909) and Weimar.

Moest died at the age of 47. On the day of his death, he was still singing in Vienna.

His voice has been preserved on Parlophone, Odeon and Pathé records.

Moest's brothers were the sculptor Hermann Moest and the actor Friedrich Moest.
