= Rorschach, Switzerland =

Rorschach
- Municipality
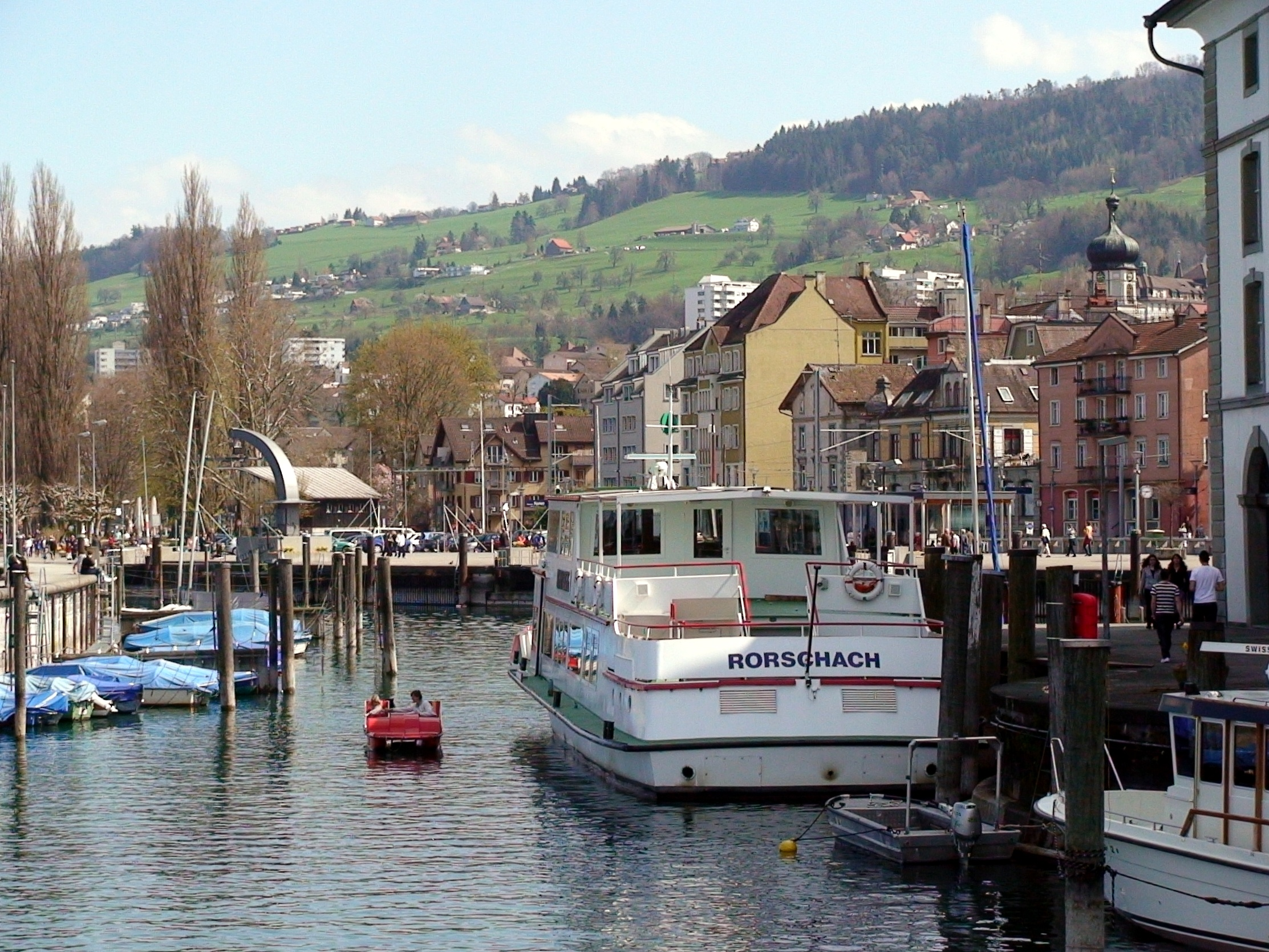

- Flag Coat of arms
- Location of Rorschach
- Location within Switzerland Location within Canton of St. Gallen
- Coordinates: 47°28′N 9°30′E
- Country: Switzerland
- Canton: St. Gallen
- District: Rorschach

Government
  - Executive: Stadtrat with 5 members
  - Mayor: Stadtpräsident (list); Robert Raths FDP/PRD (as of April 2020)

Area
  - Total: 1.78 km^{2} (0.69 sq mi)
- Elevation: 400 m (1,300 ft)

Population (December 2020)
  - Total: 9,646
  - Density: 5,420/km^{2} (14,000/sq mi)
- Time zone: UTC+01:00 (CET)
  - Summer (DST): UTC+02:00 (CEST)
- Postal code: 9400
- SFOS number: 3215
- ISO 3166 code: CH-SG
- Surrounded by: Goldach, Horn (TG), Rorschacherberg
- Twin towns: Sopron (Hungary)
- Website: rorschach.ch

Rorschach (Swiss Standard German pronunciation: [ˈroːrʃax]) is a town and a municipality in the district of Rorschach in the canton of St. Gallen in Switzerland. It is on the south side of Lake Constance (Bodensee).

== History ==
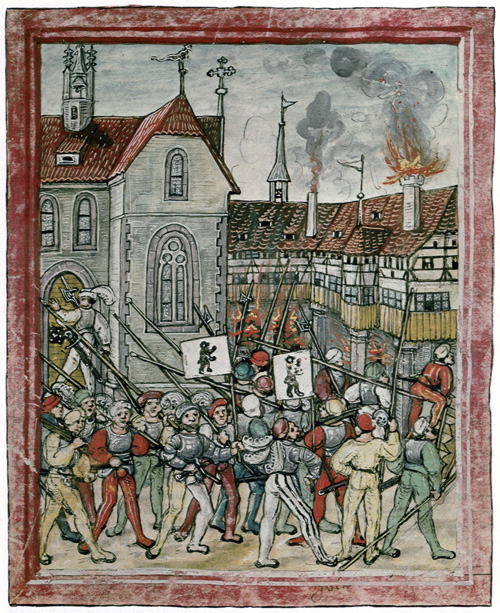
Appenzell and St. Gallen troops attack Mariaberg Monastery in Rorschach. Amtliche Luzerner Chronik, 1513

Rorschach is first mentioned in 850 as Rorscachun. In 947, Otto I granted the abbot of St. Gall the right to operate markets, mint coins and levy tariffs at Rorschach.

In 1489–90 the Rorschacher Klosterbruch or destruction of the abbey at Rorschach touched off the St. Gallen War. Following decades of conflict with the city of St. Gallen, in late 1480 Abbot Ulrich Rösch began planning to move the abbey away from the city of St. Gallen to Rorschach. By moving he hoped to escape the independence and conflict in the city. Additionally, by moving closer to the important lake trade routes, he could make Rorschach into a major harbor and collect a fortune in taxes. In turn Mayor Varnbüler and the city feared that a new harbor on the lake would cause trade to bypass St. Gallen and Appenzell. They would then be forced to go through the Prince-Bishop's harbor to sell their fabric. Though the city of St. Gallen and Appenzell opposed the new monastery, after the approval of Pope Sixtus IV and protracted negotiations with Emperor Friedrich III the corner stone of the new Mariaberg Abbey was laid on 21 March 1487.

At first the city simply protested the Abbot's plan, but when that went nowhere, they began planning an attack on the abbey. They believed that the Swiss Confederation would not intervene due to tensions between them and the Swabian League. On 28 July 1489 a group of 1200 Appenzellers and 350 St. Galleners assembled at Grub (now part of Eggersriet) and marched on the Abbey. They quickly tore down the walls and burned everything they could find. After spending the night drinking and feasting on the abbot's supplies, they returned to their homes. The attack cost the Abbot the 13,000 gulden he had already spent on construction along with an additional 3,000 in furniture and supplies. The Abbey's vassals were supportive of the actions of the city and Appenzell and on 21 October 1489 signed the Waldkircher Bund with the rebels.

The Abbot spent the following months seeking support from his allies in the Old Swiss Confederation to punish St. Gallen and Appenzell. Initially he had little success. While the four allied cantons (Zürich, Lucerne, Schwyz and Glarus) generally supported the Abbot, the remainder of the Confederacy did not. However, the creation of the Waldkircher Bund appeared threatening to the Confederation and moved it to support the Abbot. On 24 January 1490, the Confederacy allowed the four cantons to attack the city and Appenzell. Facing forces from the Confederation, the Waldkircher Bund dissolved as each group prepared to defend themselves. The Swiss army besieged St. Gallen on 11 or 12 February and on 15 February the city surrendered. The peace treaty dissolved the Bund, restored the abbot's lands, allowed him to rebuild Mariaburg Abbey but required him to remain in St. Gallen. Mariaberg Monastery was rebuilt starting in 1497 and completed 1518. But it only served the monastery of St. Gallen as an administrative center and later became a school.

== Geography ==
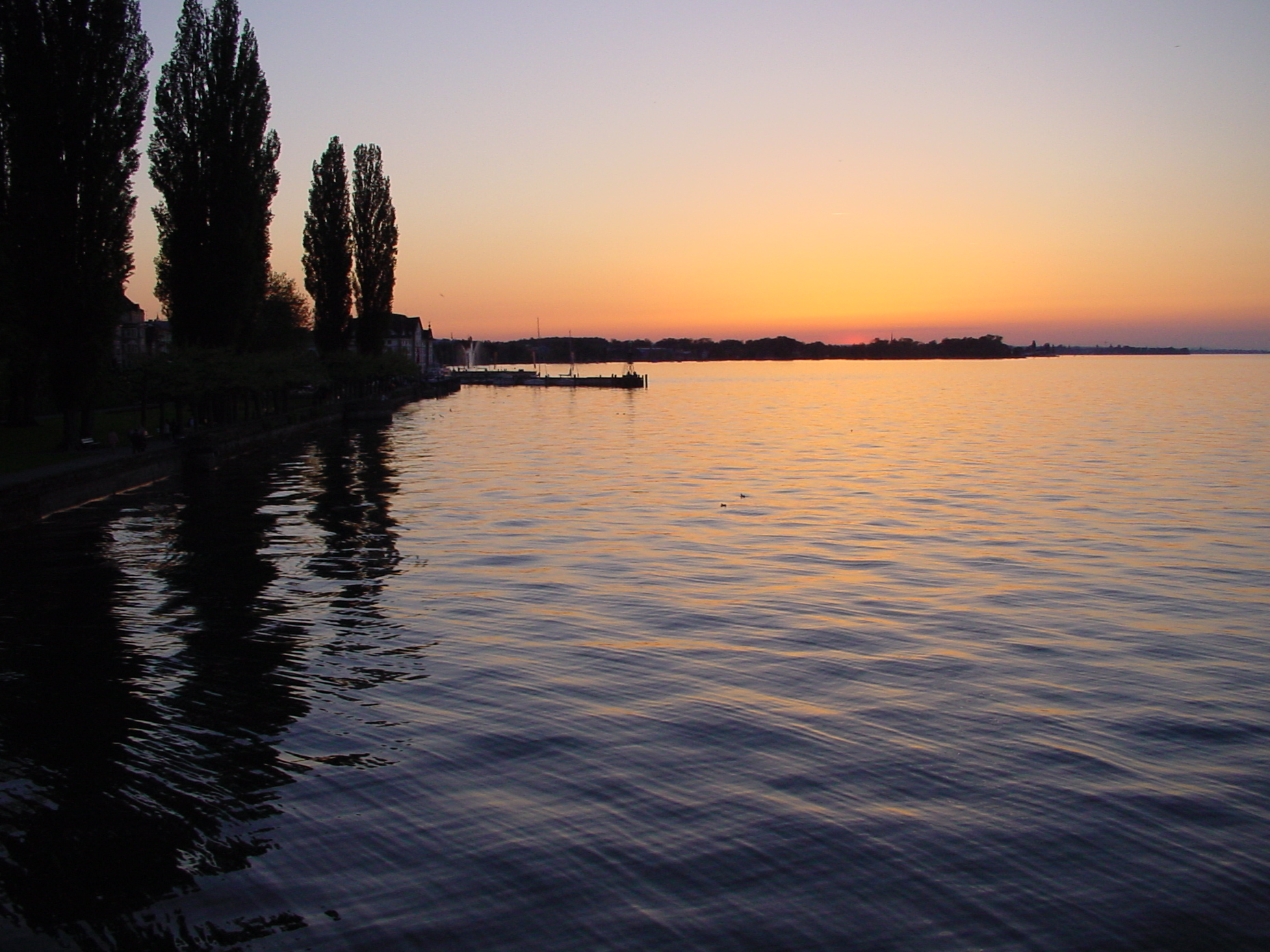
Lake Constance near Rorschach

Rorschach has an area, as of 2006, of 1.8 km^{2} (0.69 sq mi). Of this area, 7.3% is used for agricultural purposes, while 1.7% is forested. Of the rest of the land, 90.4% is settled (buildings or roads) and the remainder (0.6%) is non-productive (rivers or lakes).

The municipality is the capital of the Rorschach Wahlkreis. It is located on Lake Constance and bordered by the municipalities of Rorschacherberg and Goldach.

== Coat of arms ==
The blazon of the municipal coat of arms is Gules a Garb Or between two Perches urinant.

== Demographics ==
Rorschach has a population (as of 31 December 2020) of 9,646. As of 2007, about 43.7% of the population was made up of foreign nationals. Of the foreign population, (as of 2000), 156 are from Germany, 747 are from Italy, 1,353 are from ex-Yugoslavia, 103 are from Austria, 329 are from Turkey, and 740 are from another country. Over the last 10 years the population has decreased at a rate of −5%. Most of the population (as of 2000) speaks German (76.0%), with Italian being second most common ( 5.3%) and Serbo-Croatian being third ( 4.4%). Of the Swiss national languages (as of 2000), 6,572 speak German, 38 people speak French, 462 people speak Italian, and 13 people speak Romansh.

The age distribution, as of 2000, in Rorschach is; 885 children or 10.2% of the population are between 0 and 9 years old and 991 teenagers or 11.5% are between 10 and 19. Of the adult population, 1,224 people or 14.2% of the population are between 20 and 29 years old. 1,351 people or 15.6% are between 30 and 39, 1,190 people or 13.8% are between 40 and 49, and 1,013 people or 11.7% are between 50 and 59. The senior population distribution is 786 people or 9.1% of the population are between 60 and 69 years old, 751 people or 8.7% are between 70 and 79, there are 402 people or 4.6% who are between 80 and 89, and there are 54 people or 0.6% who are between 90 and 99.

In 2000 there were 1,848 persons (or 21.4% of the population) who were living alone in a private dwelling. There were 1,916 (or 22.2%) persons who were part of a couple (married or otherwise committed) without children, and 3,925 (or 45.4%) who were part of a couple with children. There were 555 (or 6.4%) people who lived in single parent home, while there are 42 persons who were adult children living with one or both parents, 38 persons who lived in a household made up of relatives, 96 who lived household made up of unrelated persons, and 227 who are either institutionalized or live in another type of collective housing.

In the 2007 federal election the most popular party was the SVP which received 26.1% of the vote. The next three most popular parties were the SP (23.6%), the CVP (22.9%) and the FDP (13.9%).

In Rorschach about 55.3% of the population (between age 25–64) have completed either non-mandatory upper secondary education or additional higher education (either university or a Fachhochschule). Out of the total population in Rorschach, as of 2000, the highest education level completed by 2,313 people (26.7% of the population) was Primary, while 2,915 (33.7%) have completed their secondary education, 704 (8.1%) have attended a Tertiary school, and 582 (6.7%) are not in school. The remainder did not answer this question.

The historical population is given in the following table:

year	population
1468	ca 875
1850	1,751
1900	9,140
1950	11,325
2000	8,647

== Transport ==
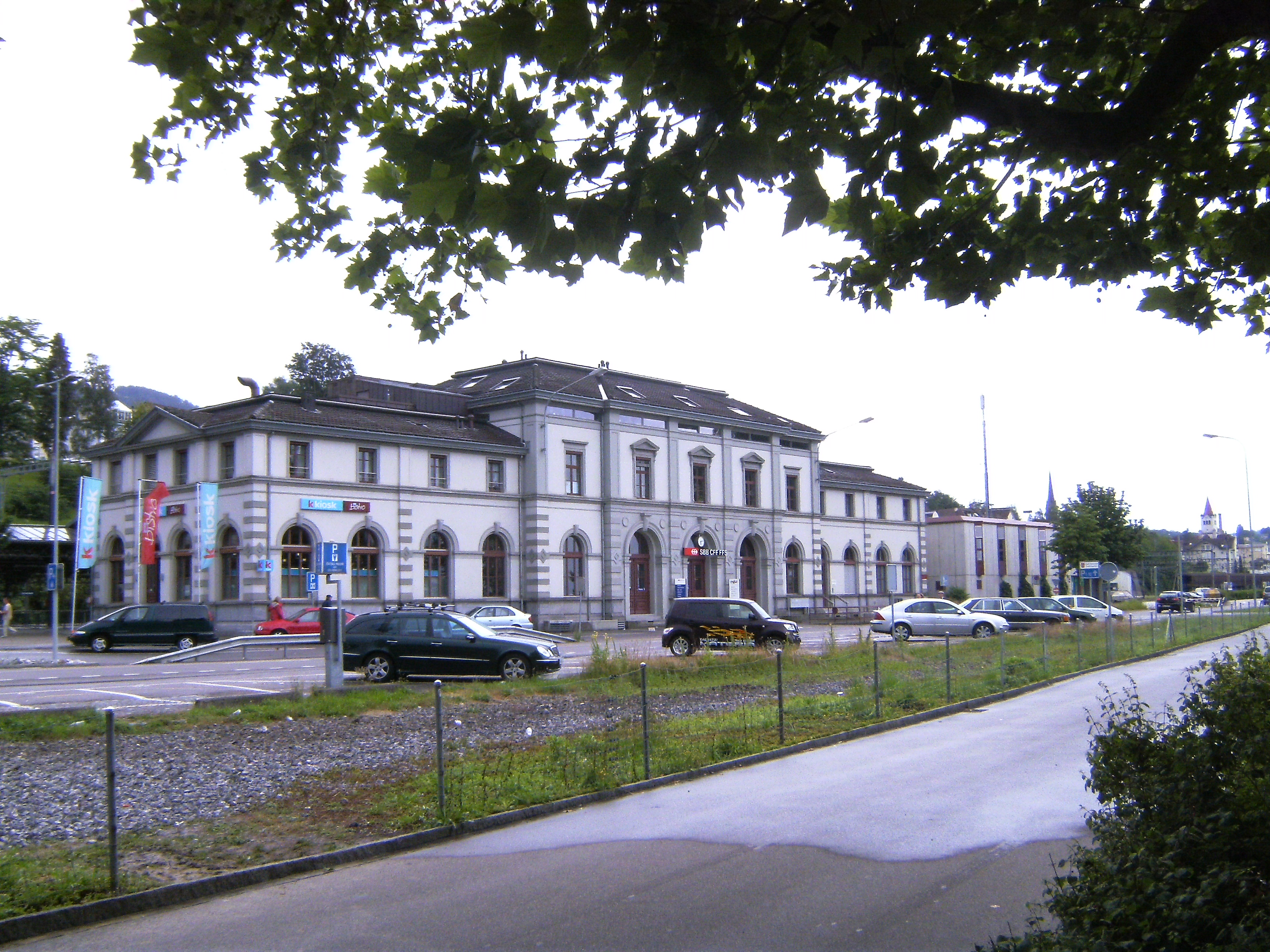
Rorschach train station

The city has three railway stations: Rorschach (main railway station), Rorschach Hafen (harbour) and Rorschach Stadt. The railway lines link the city to St. Gallen, St. Margrethen, and Romanshorn. A rack railway, the Rorschach-Heiden-Bahn, leads to Heiden (800 m / 2,600 ft a.s.l.). In 1856, the station became the terminus of the Zurich–St. Gallen line. Formerly, train carriages were transported over Lake Constance by ferry, and thus it was possible to reach Heiden from Frankfurt or Berlin without changing trains.

The A1 highway runs close to the south of Rorschach, but the town does not have its own junction. The highway leads towards St. Gallen to the west and St. Margrethen to the east.

Rorschach also has a harbour served by passenger ferries, which travel to nearby towns on the Swiss and German sides of the lake. Boat cruises are operated by Schweizerische Bodensee-Schifffahrt on Lake Constance and the Alter Rhein ("Old Rhine").

A number of hiking trails either start or end in Rorschach, including the Via Jacobi (one of the routes of the Way of St. James), the Alpine Panorama Trail to Geneva, and the Rheintaler Höhenweg to Sargans.

== Economy ==
As of 2000 there were 1,878 residents who worked in the municipality, while 2,486 residents worked outside Rorschach and 4,218 people commuted into the municipality for work.

In 2007, Rorschach had an unemployment rate of 3.59%. In 2005, there were 30 people employed in the primary economic sector and about 3 businesses involved in this sector. 1,188 people are employed in the secondary sector and there are 103 businesses in this sector. 3,417 people are employed in the tertiary sector, with 467 businesses in this sector.

As of October 2009 the average unemployment rate was 6.3%. There were 558 businesses in the municipality of which 107 were involved in the secondary sector of the economy while 451 were involved in the third.

== Religion ==
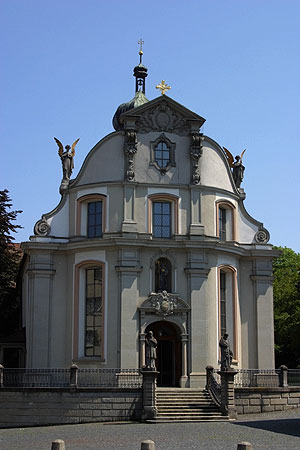
Baroque Church of St. Kolumban

From the 2000 census, 4,033 or 46.6% are Roman Catholic, while 1,868 or 21.6% belonged to the Swiss Reformed Church. Of the rest of the population, there are 9 individuals (or about 0.10% of the population) who belong to the Christian Catholic faith, there are 407 individuals (or about 4.71% of the population) who belong to the Orthodox Church, and there are 187 individuals (or about 2.16% of the population) who belong to another Christian church. There is 1 individual who is a Jew, and 1,106 (or about 12.79% of the population) who are Muslims. There are 68 individuals (or about 0.79% of the population) who belong to another church (not listed on the census), 652 (or about 7.54% of the population) belong to no church, are agnostic or atheist, and 316 individuals (or about 3.65% of the population) did not answer the question.

== Heritage sites of national significance ==
The former granary (Kornhaus) at Hauptstrasse 58 and the former Benedictine Mariaberg Abbey (now the Kantonales Lehrerseminar) at Seminarstrasse 27 are listed as Swiss heritage sites of national significance. Also in the area are the lake promenade, an aviation museum in Altenrhein and the nearby castles of St. Anna, Wartensee, Sulzberg and Wartegg. Additionally, the whole town of Rorschach and the Schlosslandschaft Rorschach / Alter Rhein, a number of castles in a region along the Rhine, are designated as part of the Inventory of Swiss Heritage Sites. The Schlosslandschaft is shared between Berg, Goldach, Mörschwil, Rheineck, Rorschacherberg, St. Margrethen, Steinach, Thal and Tübach.

== Notable people ==
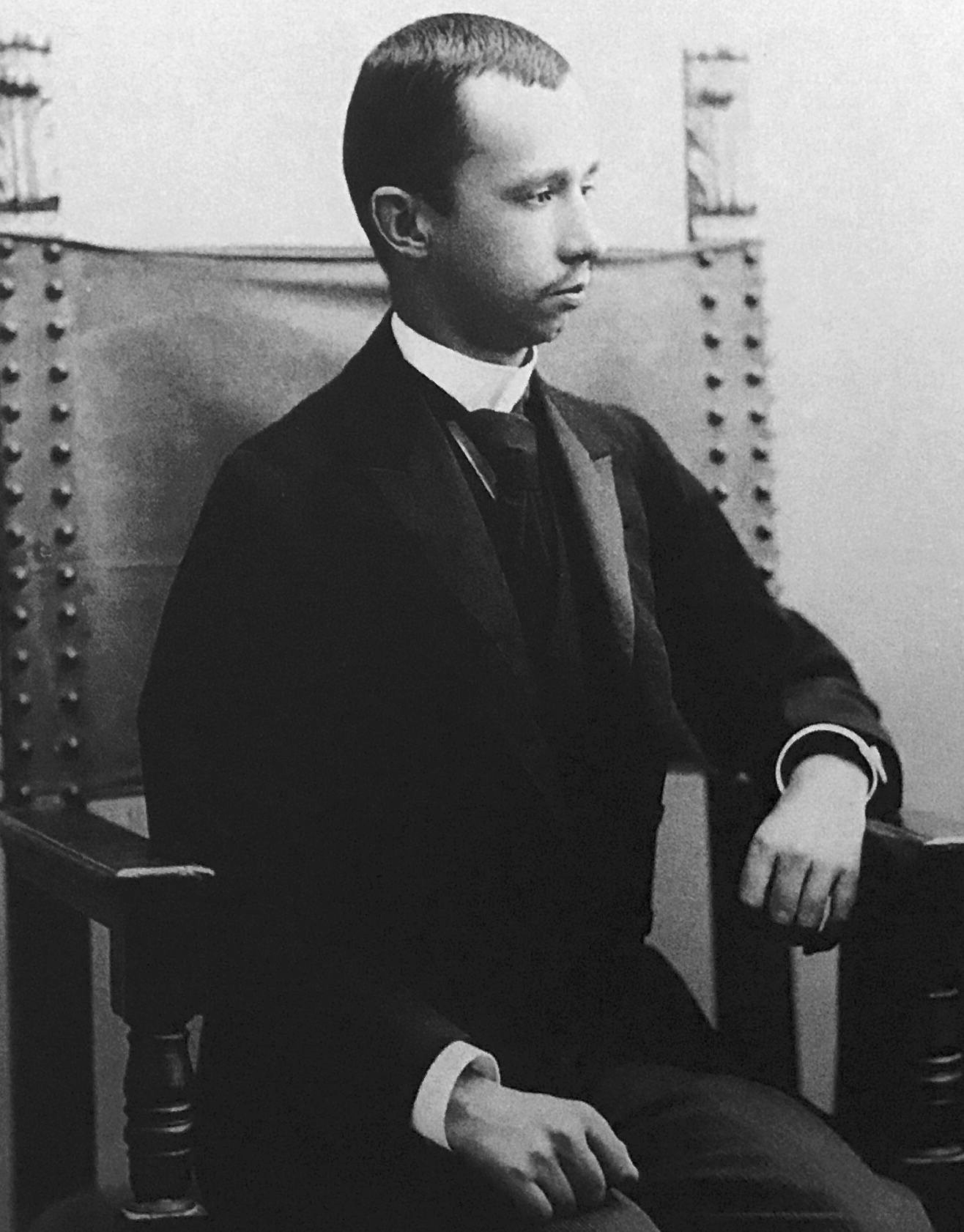
Henry, Duke of Parma

- Diethelm Blarer von Wartensee (1503 at Wartensee Castle near Rorschach – 1564 in Rorschach), Abbot of the Abbey of Saint Gall, 1530 to 1564.
- Joseph Caspar (1799 in Rorschach – 1880), a Swiss painter and engraver
- August von Bayer (1803–1875), a German painter of architectural subjects
- John Joseph Frederick Otto Zardetti (1847–1902), a Roman Catholic priest and Bishop
- Eugen Zardetti (1849–1926), a Swiss portrait and marine painter and early automobile owner.
- Emil Jannings (1884–1950), a German actor, Academy Award for Best Actor, 1929
- Elsa Cavelti (1907–2001), a Swiss operatic contralto and mezzo-soprano
- Neel Jani (born 1983), a Swiss professional racing driver of Indian Gujarati origin
- Urs App (born 1949 in Rorschach), an historian of ideas, religions and philosophies
- Daniel Pavlović (born 1988), a Bosnian professional footballer

== Gallery ==
Aerial view by Walter Mittelholzer (between 1918 and 1937)

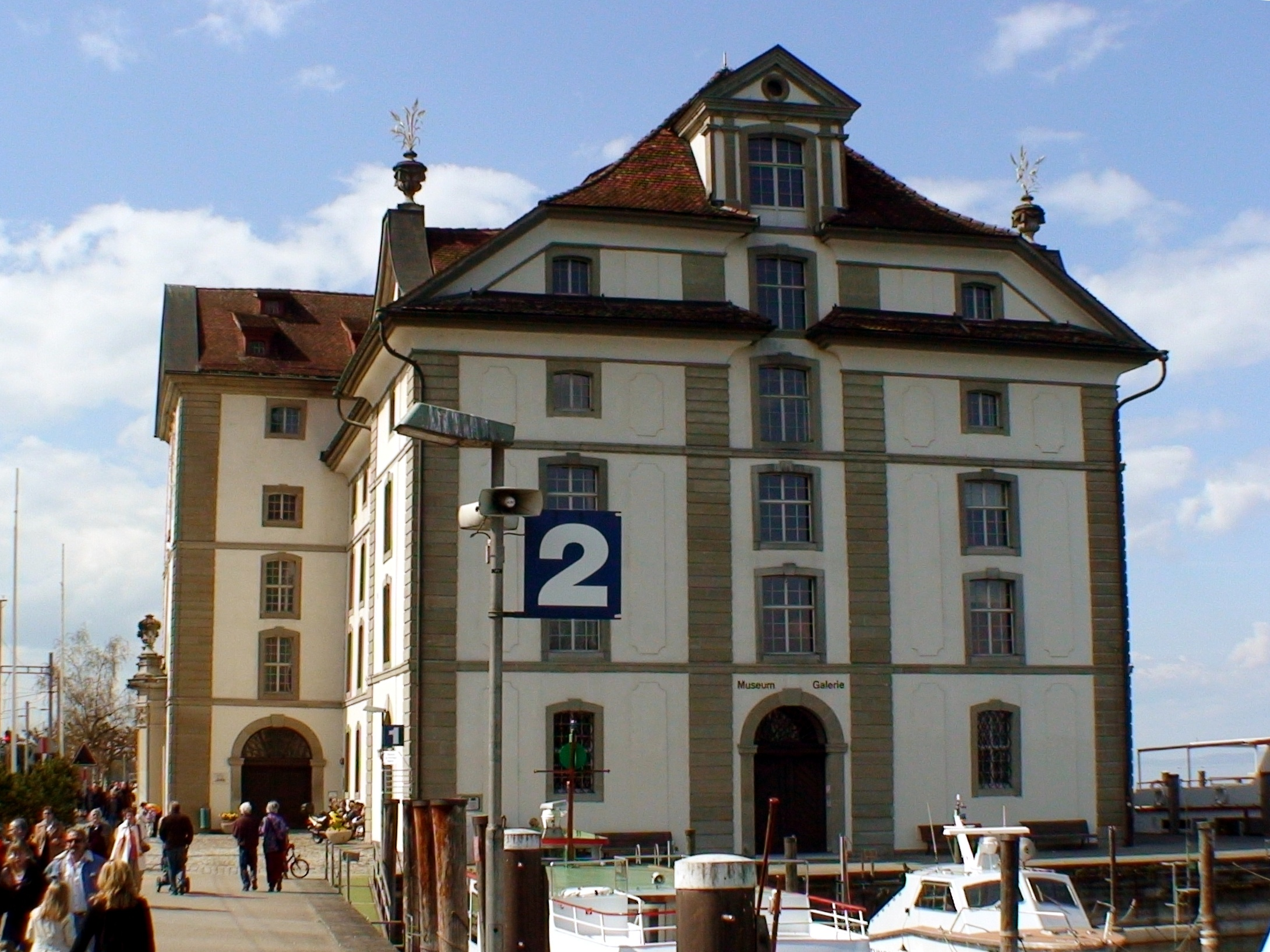
The Kornhaus (1749)

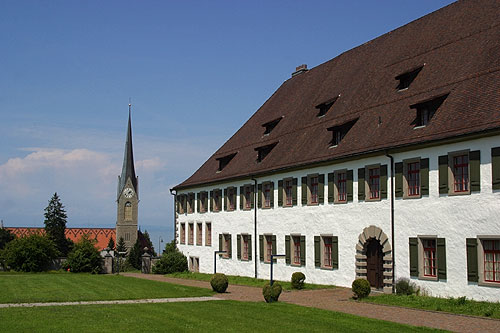
Mariaberg Abbey

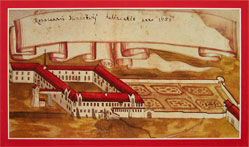
Plan of Mariaberg Abbey in 1689

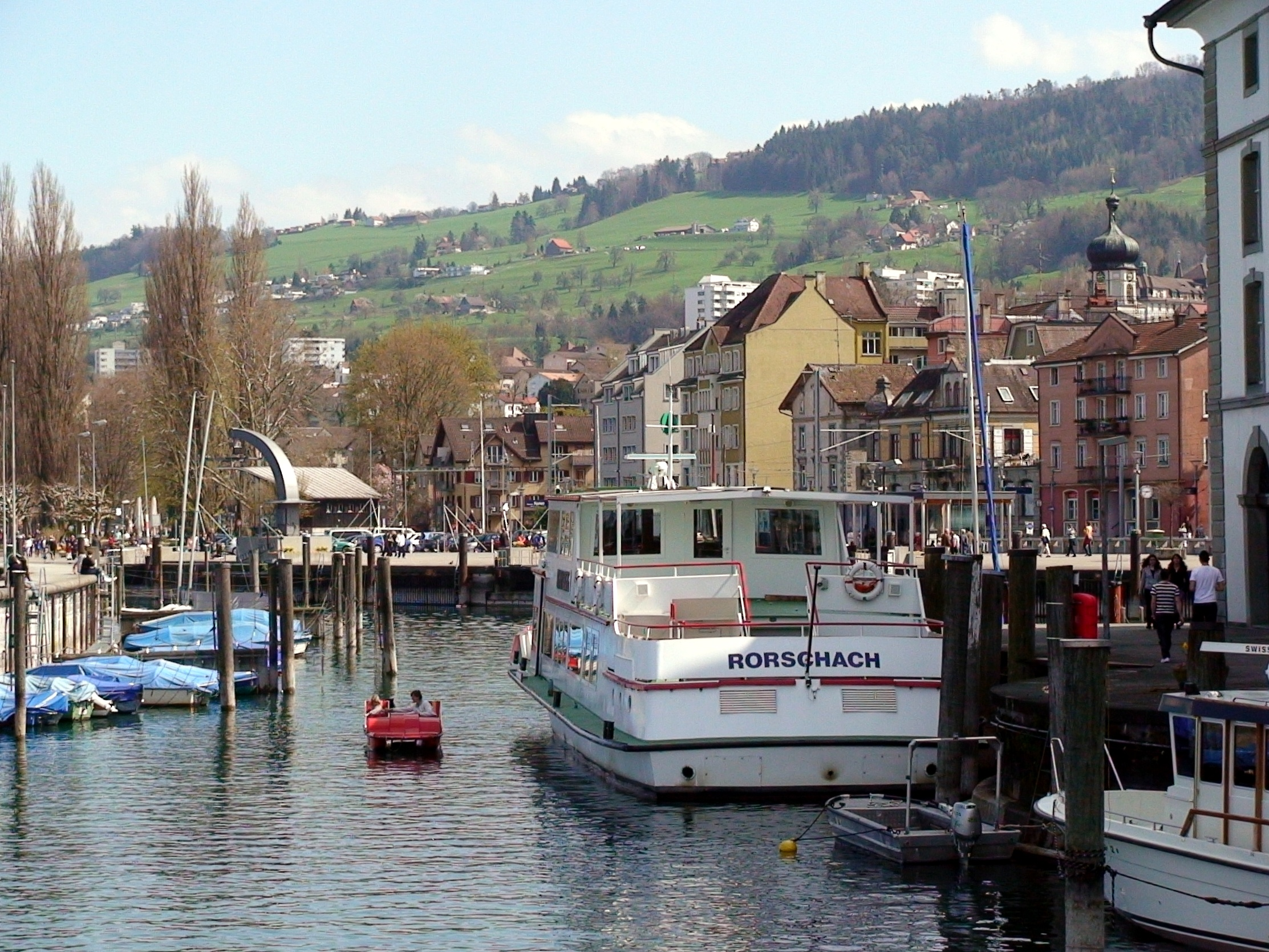
Quay

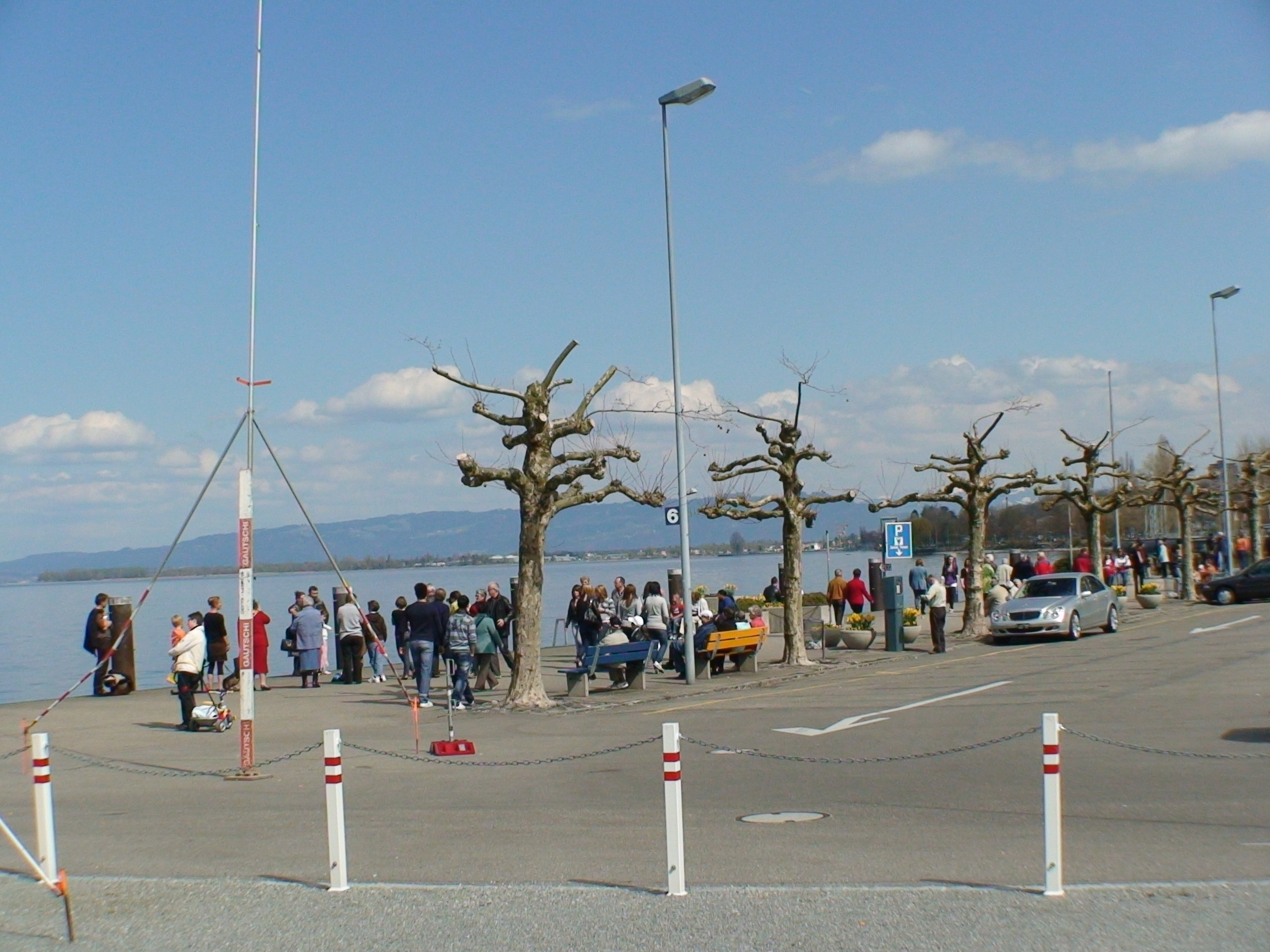
Lakeside

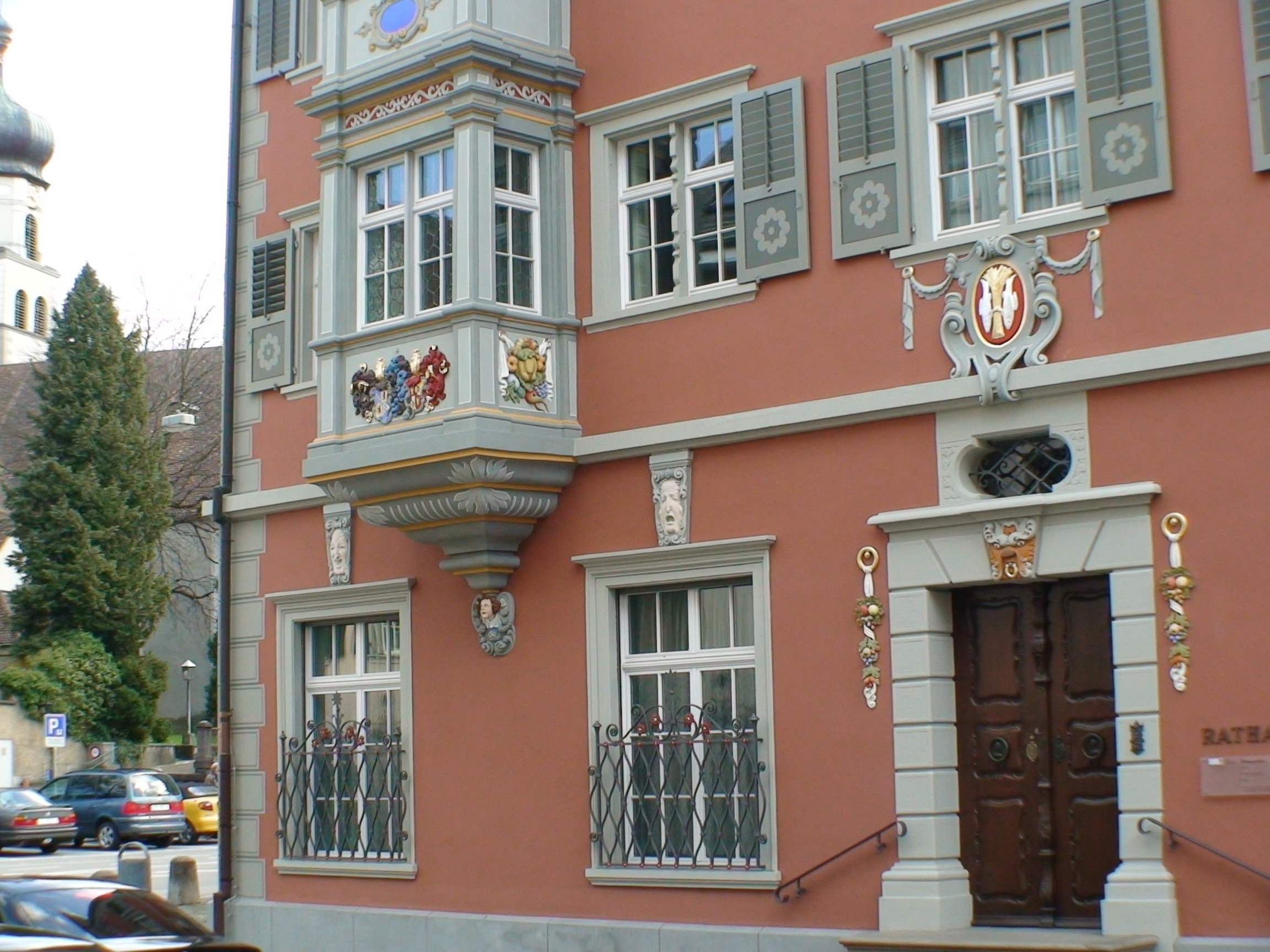
Town hall

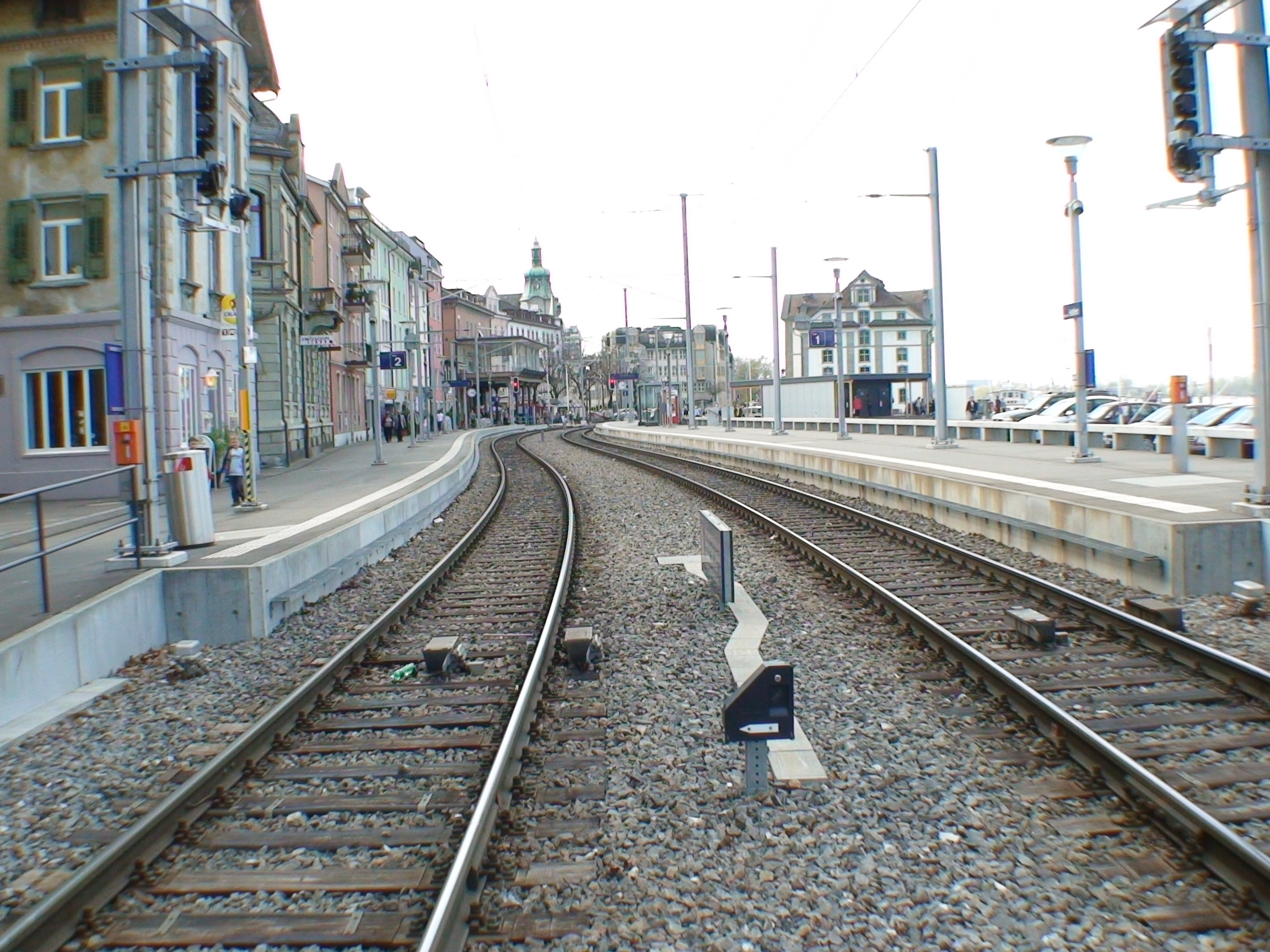
Railway line
