= Nový Šaldorf-Sedlešovice =

- Municipality
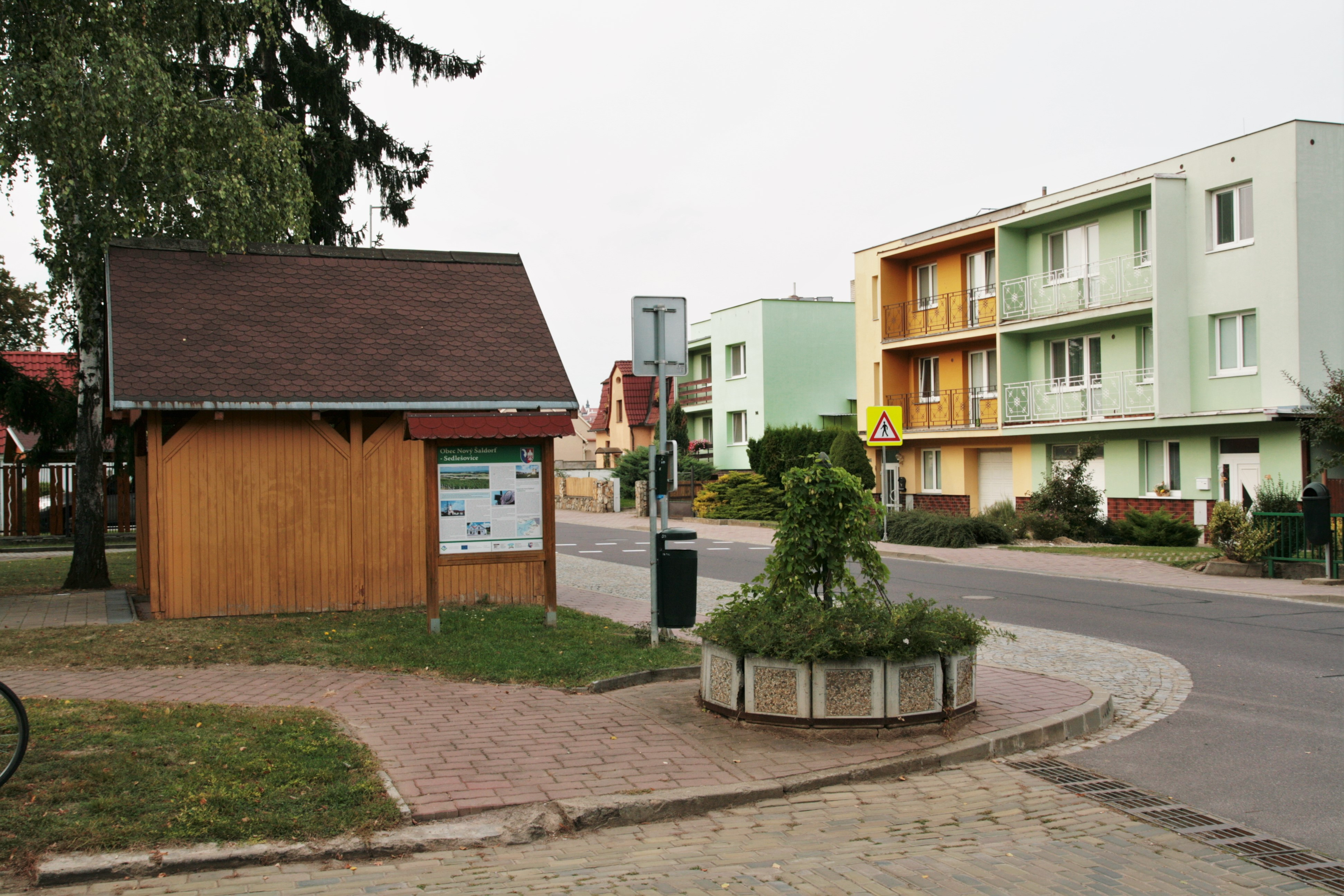
- Bus stop in Sedlešovice

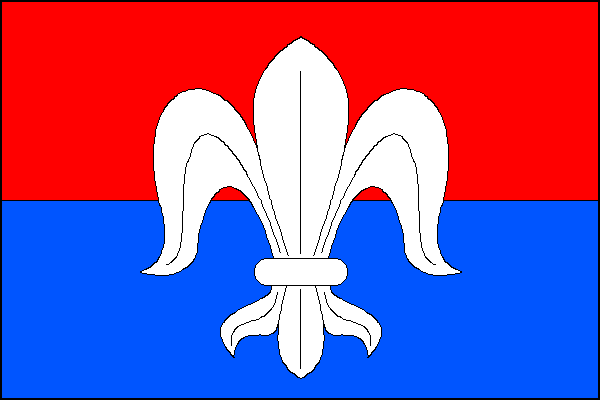
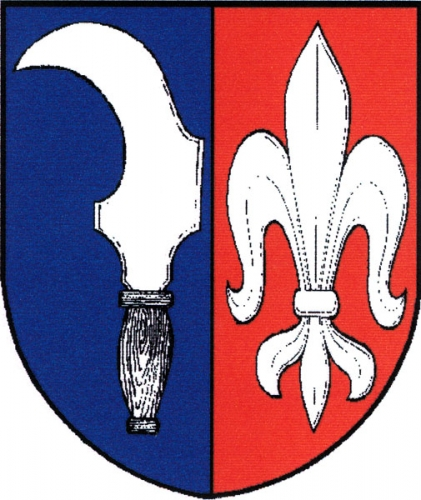
- Flag Coat of arms

- Location in the Czech Republic
- Coordinates: 48°49′44″N 16°3′43″E
- Country: Czech Republic
- Region: South Moravian
- District: Znojmo
- First mentioned: 1190

Area
  - Total: 8.46 km^{2} (3.27 sq mi)
- Elevation: 213 m (699 ft)

Population (2026-01-01)
  - Total: 1,871
  - Density: 221/km^{2} (573/sq mi)
- Time zone: UTC+1 (CET)
  - Summer (DST): UTC+2 (CEST)
- Postal code: 671 81
- Website: www.saldorf-sedlesovice.cz

Nový Šaldorf-Sedlešovice is a municipality in Znojmo District in the South Moravian Region of the Czech Republic. It has about 1,900 inhabitants.

== Administrative division ==
Nový Šaldorf-Sedlešovice consists of two municipal parts (in brackets population according to the 2021 census):

- Nový Šaldorf (1,102)
- Sedlešovice (566)

== Geography ==
Nový Šaldorf-Sedlešovice is urbanistically fused with neighbouring Znojmo and is located about 55 km (34 mi) southwest of Brno. It lies mostly in the Jevišovice Uplands, the southern part of the municipal territory lies in the Dyje–Svratka Valley. The highest point is the hill Kraví hora at 347 m (1,138 ft) above sea level. The municipality is situated on the left bank of the Thaya River, which separates it from Znojmo.

== History ==
The first written mention of Sedlešovice is from 1190. Nový Šaldorf was founded around 1580, and first mentioned in 1656.

Until 1960, the two villages formed two separate municipalities. Between 1961 and 1976, Sedlešovice was a municipal part of the Nový Šaldorf municipality. Between 1976 and 1991, Nový Šaldorf and Sedlešovice were municipal parts of Znojmo. They separated on 1 January 1992 and made the current municipality.

== Demographics ==
Historical population

Year	Pop.	±%
1869	1,119	—
1880	1,130	+1.0%
1890	1,250	+10.6%
1900	1,349	+7.9%
1910	1,291	−4.3%

Year	Pop.	±%
1921	1,194	−7.5%
1930	1,105	−7.5%
1950	873	−21.0%
1961	898	+2.9%
1970	913	+1.7%

Year	Pop.	±%
1980	886	−3.0%
1991	765	−13.7%
2001	875	+14.4%
2011	1,262	+44.2%
2021	1,668	+32.2%

Source: Censuses

== Transport ==
Nový Šaldorf-Sedlešovice is located on the railway line heading from Znojmo to Wiener Neustadt Hauptbahnhof in Austria. The municipality is served by the train station called Znojmo-Nový Šaldorf.

== Sights ==
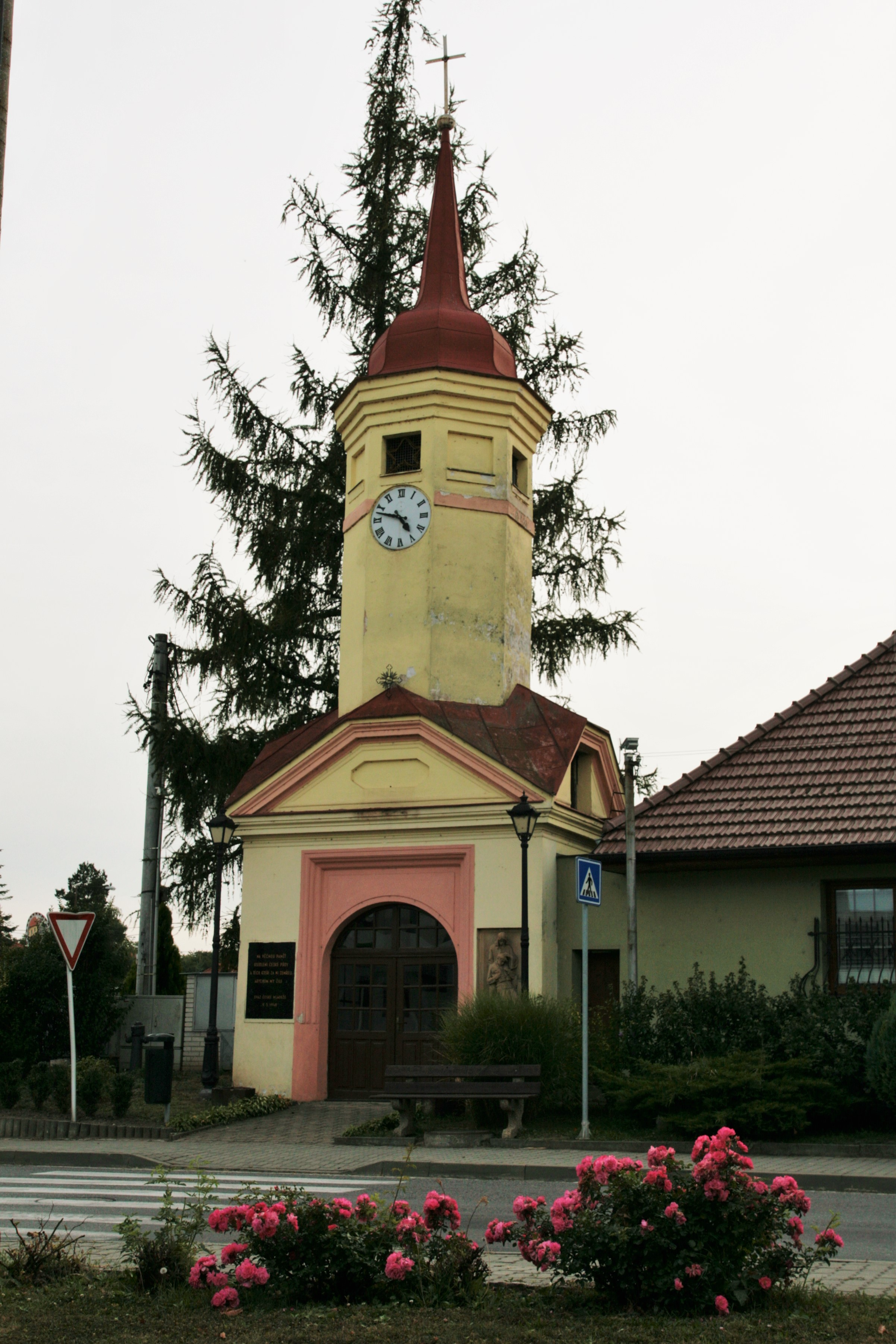
Chapel in Nový Šaldorf

Among the protected cultural monuments in the municipality are a late Gothic column shrine from 1525 and two niche chapels. A cultural landmark of the centre of Nový Šaldorf is a chapel.

== Notable people ==
- Franz Krückl (1841–1899), Austrian opera singer
