= Urs App =

Swiss historian

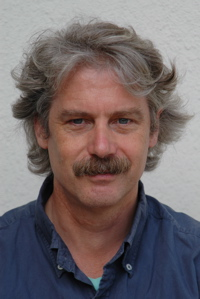
- Born: Urs App; August 10, 1949 (age 77); Rorschach, Switzerland

Urs App (born 1949 in Rorschach, Switzerland) is a historian of ideas, religions, and philosophies with a special interest in the history and modes of interaction between East and West.

== Biography ==
Urs App was born in 1949 in Rorschach on the Swiss shore of the Lake of Constance and studied in Freiburg, Kyoto and Philadelphia psychology, philosophy and religious studies. In 1989 he obtained a Ph.D. in Religious Studies (Chinese Buddhism) from Temple University in Philadelphia. From 1989 to 1999 he was full professor of Buddhism at Hanazono University in Kyoto and Associate Director of the International Research Institute for Zen Buddhism at Hanazono University (Director Seizan YANAGIDA). He has since devoted himself to writing books and producing documentaries while engaging in research at various academic institutions in Asia and Europe, most recently at the Research Institute for Zen Culture (Zenbunka kenkyujo, Kyoto; 2005–2007), the Swiss National Science Foundation (SNSF; 2007–2010), the Scuola Italiana di Studi sull'Asia Orientale (Italian School of East Asian Studies, ISEAS; 2010-2011), and the École Française d'Extrême-Orient (2012-).

Focuses of research are Buddhist studies (especially Zen Buddhism), the history of orientalism, the history of the European discovery of Asian religions, the history of philosophy in East and West (in particular also Schopenhauer's reception of Asian religions and philosophies), and the exchange of ideas between Asia and the West.

== Books ==
- The Mother of All Religions: The Genesis of Blavatsky's Theosophy: Ancient Theology, Orientalism, and Buddhism. East-West Discovery. Will, Switzerland & Paris: UniversityMedia, 2025. (ISBN 978-3-906000-36-7)
- Blavatsky on Buddhism: Interviews, Letters, and Papers. Will, Switzerland & Paris: UniversityMedia, 2023. (ISBN 978-3-906000-33-6)
- Zen Meister Yunmen. Leben und Lehre des letzten Giganten der Zen-Klassik. Wil, Switzerland & Paris: UniversityMedia, 2018 (ISBN 978-3-906000-29-9)
- Zen Master Yunmen. His Life and Essential Sayings. Boulder: Shambhala, 2018 (ISBN 978-1-61180-559-8)
- Michel-Jean-François Ozeray and Urs App.The First Western Book on Buddhism and Buddha. Wil: UniversityMedia, 2017 (ISBN 978-3-906000-27-5)
- Schopenhauer's Compass. An Introduction to Schopenhauer's Philosophy and its Origins. Wil: UniversityMedia, 2014 (ISBN 978-3-906000-03-9)
- The Cult of Emptiness. The Western Discovery of Buddhist Thought and the Invention of Oriental Philosophy. Rorschach / Kyoto: UniversityMedia, 2012 (ISBN 978-3-906000-09-1). (Listed among the best Buddhist books of 2012 by the Buddhadharma journal)
- Schopenhauers Kompass. Die Geburt einer Philosophie. Rorschach / Kyoto: UniversityMedia, 2011 (ISBN 978-3-906000-08-4 [hardcover] and ISBN 978-3-906000-02-2 [paperback])
- Richard Wagner and Buddhism. Rorschach / Kyoto: UniversityMedia, 2011 (ISBN 978-3-906000-00-8)
- The Birth of Orientalism. Philadelphia: University of Pennsylvania Press, 2010 (ISBN 978-0-8122-4261-4) (Winner of the 2012 book prize of the French Académie des Inscriptions et Belles-Lettres)
- Arthur Schopenhauer and China. Sino-Platonic Papers Nr. 200 (April 2010) (8,7 Mb PDF, 172 p.)
- William Jones's Ancient Theology. Sino-Platonic Papers Nr. 191 (September 2009) (3.7 Mb PDF, 125 p.)
- Over twenty volumes of concordances of Chinese Zen texts.
- Richard Wagner und der Buddhismus: Liebe – Tragik. Zürich: Museum Rietberg, 1997. New, enlarged edition: Rorschach / Kyoto: UniversityMedia, 2011 (ISBN 978-3-906000-10-7)
- Zen-Worte vom Wolkentor-Berg. Darlegungen und Gespräche des Zen-Meisters Yunmen Wenyan (864–949). Bern / München: Barth, 1994 (ISBN 3-502-64640-6)
- Master Yunmen. New York: Kodansha International, 1994. (ISBN 1-56836-004-5).
- Facets of the Life and Teaching of Chan Master Yunmen Wenyan (864-949). Ann Arbor: University Microfilms International, 342 pp. (Ph.D. dissertation, Temple University, 1989)

== Documentary films ==
- Slow Photography: Koichiro Kurita. Documentary film for the exhibition of the Japanese photographer Koichiro Kurita at the Farnsworth Art Museum, Rockland, Maine, US (2018).
- Sengai. Documentary for the exhibition of works by the Japanese Zen master and painter Sengai at the Rietberg Museum, Zürich, Switzerland (2014).
- Der Teebesen. Documentary film for the Japanese Bamboo objects exhibition in the Ethnographic Museum of the University of Zurich, Switzerland (2003), at the Ethnological Museum Munich (Völkerkundemuseum München, 2006), and at the Trinkkultur - Kultgetränk exhibition at the Völkerkundemuseum of Zurich University, 20 June 2014 - 21 June 2015 (in collaboration with Monica Esposito).
- On the Way to Tōhaku's Pine Forest. Documentary film for the Hasegawa Tōhaku art exhibition (2002) at the Rietberg Museum, Zürich (in collaboration with Monica Esposito)
- Dangki. Documentary shown in 2001 on France 2 (in collaboration with Monica Esposito).
- Oracles in China. Documentary shown at the Oracle exhibition 2000 at the Rietberg Museum, Zürich (in collaboration with Monica Esposito).
- Oracles in Japan. Documentary shown at the Oracle exhibition 2000 at the Rietberg Museum, Zürich (in collaboration with Monica Esposito).
- Chinese Oracle Kids. Documentary shown at the Oracle exhibition 2000 at the Rietberg Museum, Zürich (in collaboration with Monica Esposito).

== CD-ROM ==
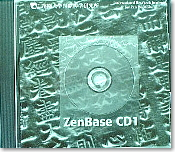
ZenBaseCD1 (1995)

- ZenBase CD1. Kyoto: International Research Institute for Zen Buddhism, 1995 (ISBN 4-938796-18-X; pioneering CD-ROM with over eighty Chinese Zen texts).

== Selection of papers ==
- "Schopenhauers Nirwana". In: Die Wahrheit ist nackt am schönsten. Arthur Schopenhauers philosophische Provokation, ed. by Michael Fleiter. Frankfurt: Institut für Stadtgeschichte / Societätsverlag, 2010, pp. 200-208.
- "The Tibet of Philosophers: Kant, Hegel, and Schopenhauer". In: Images of Tibet in the 19th and 20th Centuries, ed. by Monica Esposito. Paris: Ecole Française d'Extrême-Orient, 2008, pp. 11–70.
- "How Amida got into the Upanishads: An Orientalist’s Nightmare". In Essays on East Asian Religion and Culture, ed. by Christian Wittern und Lishan Shi. Kyoto: Editorial Committee for the Festschrift in Honour of Nishiwaki Tsuneki, 2007, pp. 11–33.
- "OUM – Das erste Wort von Schopenhauers Lieblingsbuch". In: Das Tier, das du jetzt tötest, bist du selbst ... Arthur Schopenhauer und Indien, ed. by Jochen Stollberg. Frankfurt: Vittorio Klostermann, 2006, pp. 36–50.
- "NICHTS. Das letzte Wort von Schopenhauers Hauptwerk". In: Das Tier, das du jetzt tötest, bist du selbst ... Arthur Schopenhauer und Indien, ed. by Jochen Stollberg. Frankfurt: Vittorio Klostermann, 2006, pp. 51–60.
- "Schopenhauer's India Notes of 1811". Schopenhauer-Jahrbuch 87 (2006), pp. 15–31.
- "Schopenhauer's Initial Encounter with Indian Thought". Schopenhauer-Jahrbuch 87 (2006), pp. 35–76.
- "Notizen Schopenhauers zu Ost-, Nord- und Südostasien vom Sommersemester 1811". Schopenhauer-Jahrbuch 84 (2003), pp. 13–39.
- "Die Entdeckung des Zen". In Homo Medietas. Aufsätze zu Religiosität, Literatur und Denkformen des Menschen vom Mittelalter bis in die Neuzeit, ed. by Claudia Brinker-von der Heyde. Bern: Peter Lang, 1999, pp. 13–26.
- "Notes and Excerpts by Schopenhauer Related to Volumes 1 - 9 of the Asiatick Researches". Schopenhauer-Jahrbuch 79 (1998), pp. 11–33.
- "Schopenhauers Begegnung mit dem Buddhismus." Schopenhauer-Jahrbuch 79 (1998), pp. 35–58.
- "St. Francis Xavier's Discovery of Japanese Buddhism. Part 1: Before the Arrival in Japan, 1547-1549". Eastern Buddhist 30, no. 1 (1997), pp. 53–78. "Part 2: From Kagoshima to Yamaguchi, 1549-1551.” Eastern Buddhist 30, no. 2 (1997), pp. 214–44. "Part 3: From Yamaguchi to India, 1551-1552.” Eastern Buddhist 31, no. 1 (1998), pp. 40–71.
- "Wuxinlun -- The Treatise on No-Mind." Zenbunka kenkyūsho kiyō 21 (1995): pp. 1–68.
- "Dun: A Chinese Concept as a Key to 'Mysticism' in East and West." The Eastern Buddhist Bd. XXVI No. 2 (Fall 1993), pp. 31–72.
- "Reference Works for Chan Research. A selective annotated survey." Cahiers d’Extrême-Asie 7 (1993–94), pp. 357–409.
- "The Making of a Chan Record". Zenbunka kenkyūjo kiyō (Annual Report from the Institute of Zen Studies) No. 17 (May 1991): 1–90.
