= Diethelm Blarer von Wartensee =

Abbot of St. Gall (1503–1564)

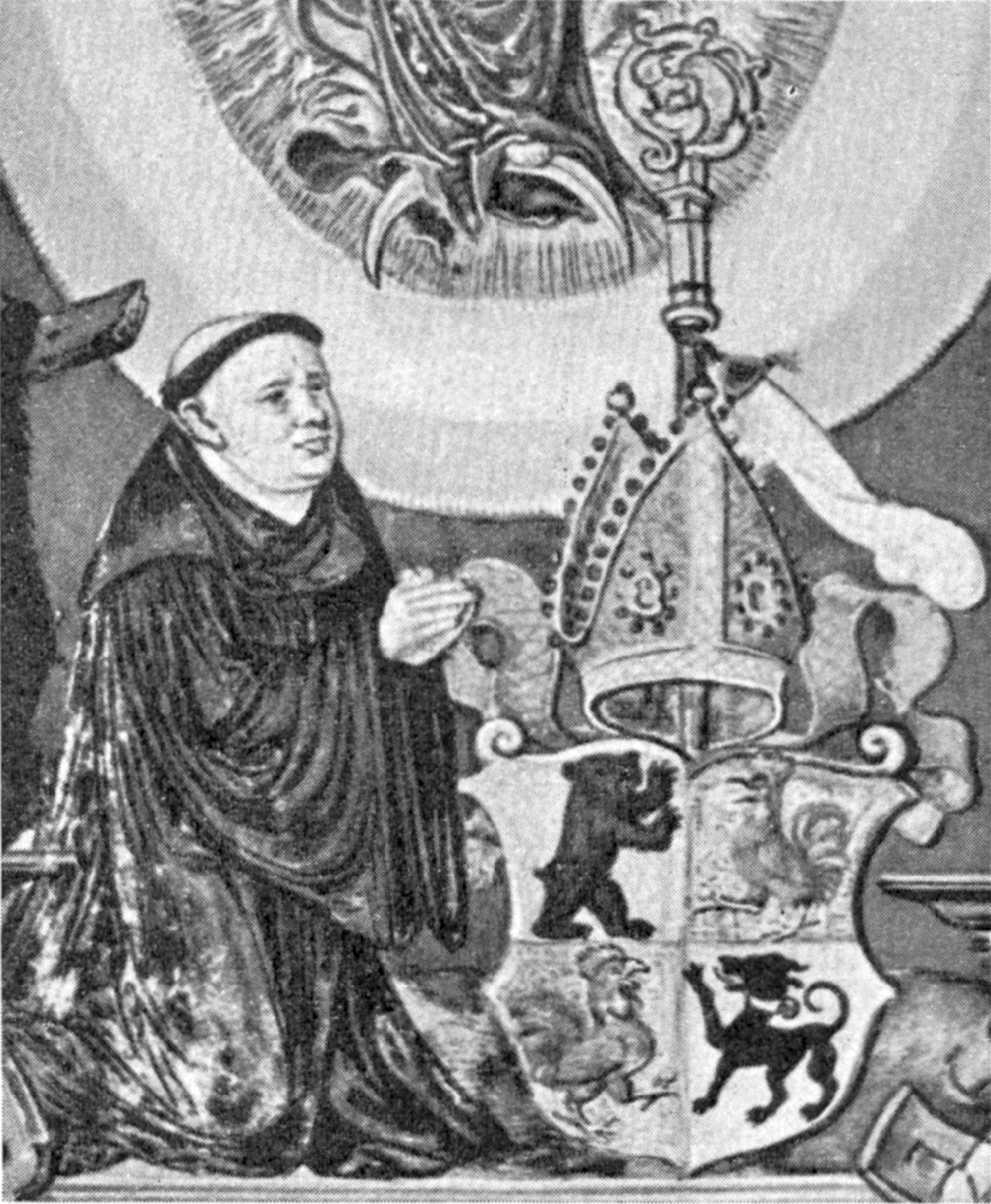
Coat of arms of Abbot Diethelm Blarer von Wartensee

Diethelm Blarer von Wartensee (born 1503 at Wartensee Castle near Rorschach; died 18 December 1564 in Rorschach) was abbot of the Abbey of Saint Gall from 1530 to 1564.

== Life ==
Diethelm's father, Jakob von Wartensee, was chief bailiff of Rorschach. His mother was Apollonia von Syrgenstein. Diethelm went to the Latin school in Lindau. He is mentioned as conventual at the Abbey of Saint Gall in 1523. Since 1528, he held the office of governor of Rorschach. On 19 September 1530, he was elected abbot at the Abbey of Wettingen-Mehrerau. He received the papal confirmation from Clement VII on 22 May 1531. Before that (on 10 October 1530), Emperor Charles V had already accorded him the prerogatives. After Diethelm had assured himself of the support of the five catholic towns of the Confederancy in Zug, he let himself be paid homage by his subjects in Wil on 12 December 1531 and a few days later also at Lömmenschwil and Gossau. He received the consecration from Auxiliary bishop Melchior Fattlin on 28 April 1532.

== Works ==
By means of the contract of Wil in 1538, Abbot Diethelm Blarer von Wartensee succeeded in reintroducing Toggenburg into the dominion of the Abbey of Saint Gall. As prince abbot, he was confronted with the so-called putsch of Rorschach in 1559 which was directed against the rights of serfdom of the abbey. In churchly matters, he strove for the renewal of Catholicism and for the restitution of monastic jurisdiction rights. Furthermore, he was severe on the Anabaptists among his subjects. On 28 February 1532, the city of Saint Gall restituted the abbey and guaranteed the Catholics free practice of religion in the defined monastery district. During Diethelm's term of office, the number of conventuals steadily increased. In 1555, St. John Abbey in the Thur Valley was also incorporated by the Abbey of Saint Gall due to a papal decision.

Abbot Diethelm proved to be a zealous promoter of catholic scholarliness. On 6 June 1551, he laid the foundation for the new library building at the Abbey of Saint Gall. He sent several of his conventuals to Dillingen to study, and later on also to Paris. Endeavouring to renew the religious life, he ordered the return of the relics of Saint Othmar to Saint Gall, as they had been brought to Einsiedeln Abbey during the reformation riots. Moreover, Diethelm appointed conventuals of Saint Gall as reform abbots at Wettingen Abbey (Peter Eichhorn) and Fischingen Abbey (Markus Schenkli). Probably due to his endeavours regarding the Catholic reform, he received invitations to the Council of Trent in 1543 and 1551, which, however, he did not obey.
