= Fridolin Dietsche =

German sculptor

Fridolin Dietsche (31 October 1861 - 25 June 1908) was a German sculptor from Baden.

== Context ==
Following unification in 1871 Germany underwent several decades of rapid economic modernisation and growth, which was coupled with government encouragement for expressions of national pride. This was reflected in a building boom in Karlsruhe and across the country. New churches, commercial properties and homes for rich entrepreneurs were enhanced with fashionable coloured glass embellishments, elaborate ironwork grills and ceramic tiles, wall-mounted fountains in entrance halls and, naturally, with sculptures. Municipal authorities and other public bodies also competed to commission and erect imposing sculptures in public squares, outside public buildings and in other suitable locations. This provided encouragement and opportunity for artists such as Dietsche in Karlsruhe as elsewhere.

== Life ==
Fridolin Dietsche was born at Schönau im Schwarzwald, a small town along the Wiese valley in the hills to the north-east of Basel. His father was a cabinet maker. His artistic journey began with a three-year training at the wood carving school in Furtwangen. After that, between 1880 and 1884 he studied at the "Arts and Crafts Academy" ("Kunstgewerbeschule") in Karlsruhe. The next year was spent at the Arts and Crafts Academy in Berlin, before a two-year period of study under Fritz Schaper at the Prussian Academy of Arts. He then studied more briefly under Wilhelm von Rümann at the Fine Arts Academy in Munich, before returning to Karksruhe.

Back at the "Arts and Crafts Academy" in Karlsruhe he was a "masters student" ("Meisterschüler") of Hermann Volz, while also working as a researcher and undertaking teaching assignments between 1888 and 1898. He also took the opportunity to undertake extended study trips to Paris and to Italy. In 1898 he succeeded Adolf Heer as Professor of Sculpture at the Karlsruhe academy.

In a competition for the commission of figures for the new facade of the Freiburg city hall, he was able to win against a rival tender from the city's own Gustav Adolf Knittel. With his pupil, Wilhelm Merten (1879–1952), he created for the city-hall facade a figure of Egino, the first Count of Freiburg. Another of the niches accommodated Dietsche's statue of Conrad I, Duke of Zähringen, which before finding its more permanent position was exhibited at the Paris World Fair in 1900. It was melted down during the Second World War.) The other two spaces displayed figures of Leopold III, Margrave of Austria and of Charles Frederick, the first Grand Duke of Baden. Four statues in Freiburg's Kaiser-Joseph-Straße were also taken down in 1942 and transported to Hamburg in order to be melted down. Two of these four (Emperor Maximilian I and Rudolf I) were also the work of Fridolin Dietsche, again with input, in the case of King Rudolf's statue, from Wilhelm Merten. The other two, produced between 1899 and 1900, were the work of Julius Seitz. When war ended in May 1945 all four of these bronze figures were still intact, but they were in Hamburg and war had exhausted the city's finances. In 1950 the Freiburg city council, mindful of the high cost of transporting the figures back south, renounced any rights to have them returned.

Between 1900 and 1901 Dietsche took part in another competition, this time for the creation of Karlsruhe's Bismarck Memorial. There was no overall winner of the competition as originally configured, but in a second version Dietsche's submission was determined to be the best available ("relativ besten"). Subsequently, however, the memorial committee decided to go ahead with one of the (three) proposals submitted by Karl Friedrich Moest. Despite being evidently underwhelmed by all the submissions, the committee let it be known that they favoured Moest because he was more than twenty years older than Dietsche who would, they anticipated, have plenty more opportunities to create public sculptures. Ironically, Moest would live to be 85, dying only in 1923, while Dietsche died in 1908 aged 45.

Shortly before he died Dietscke was given a commission by The Grand Duke Frederick to draft a proposal for a memorial to Karlsruhe's founder, Margrave Charles III William. The intention was to replace the Karlsruhe Pyramid in the Market Square. After there was a public outcry against the idea of removing the pyramid, Dietsche submitted a proposal that combined the pyramid with the required memorial. He prepared a model which added a separated fountain and equestrian statue which won widespread support when it was exhibited, but before the project could be further progressed he died at Hamburg while travelling to a coastal cure resort for a medical investigation.
