= List of mayors of Rorschach =

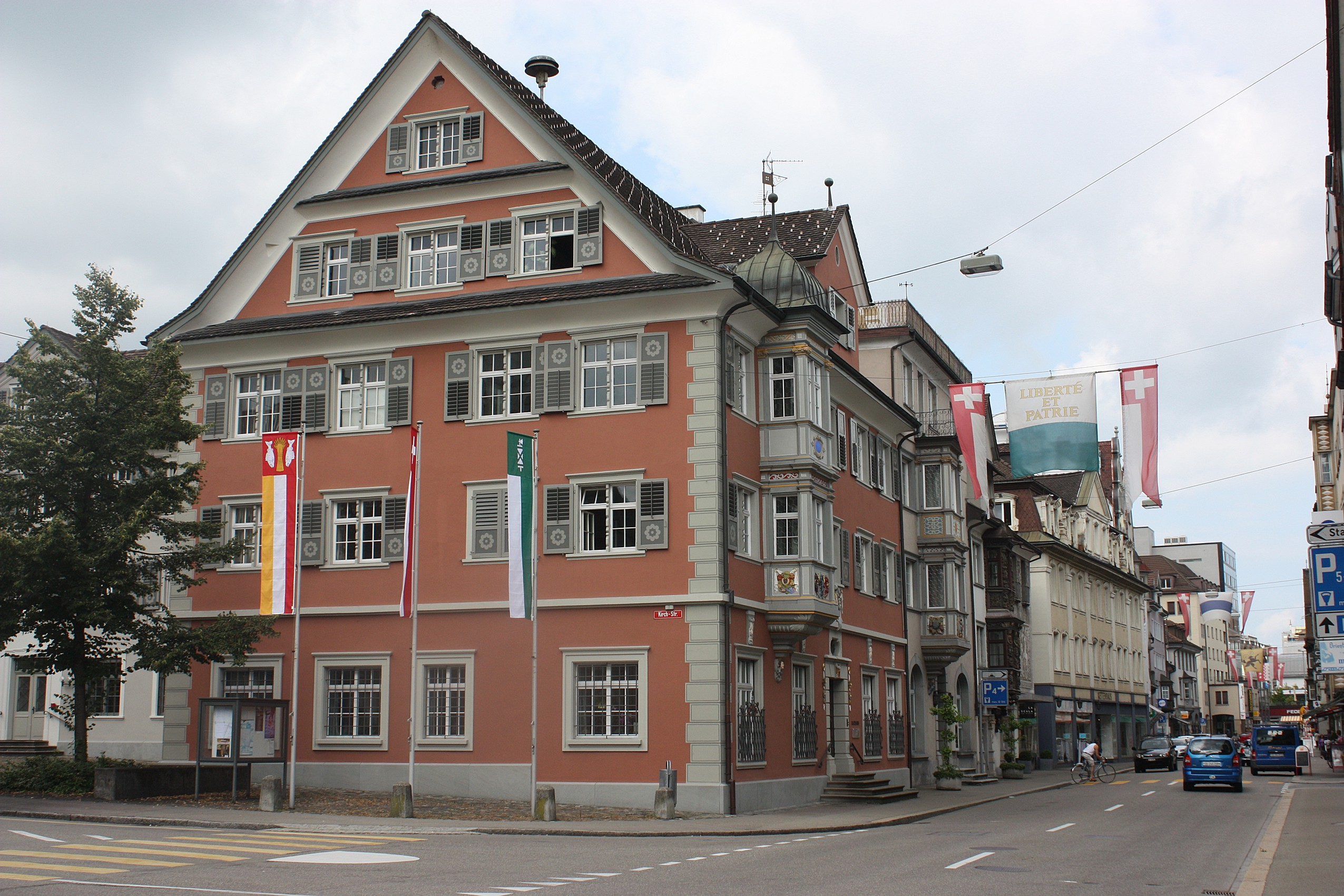
Rathaus Rorschach

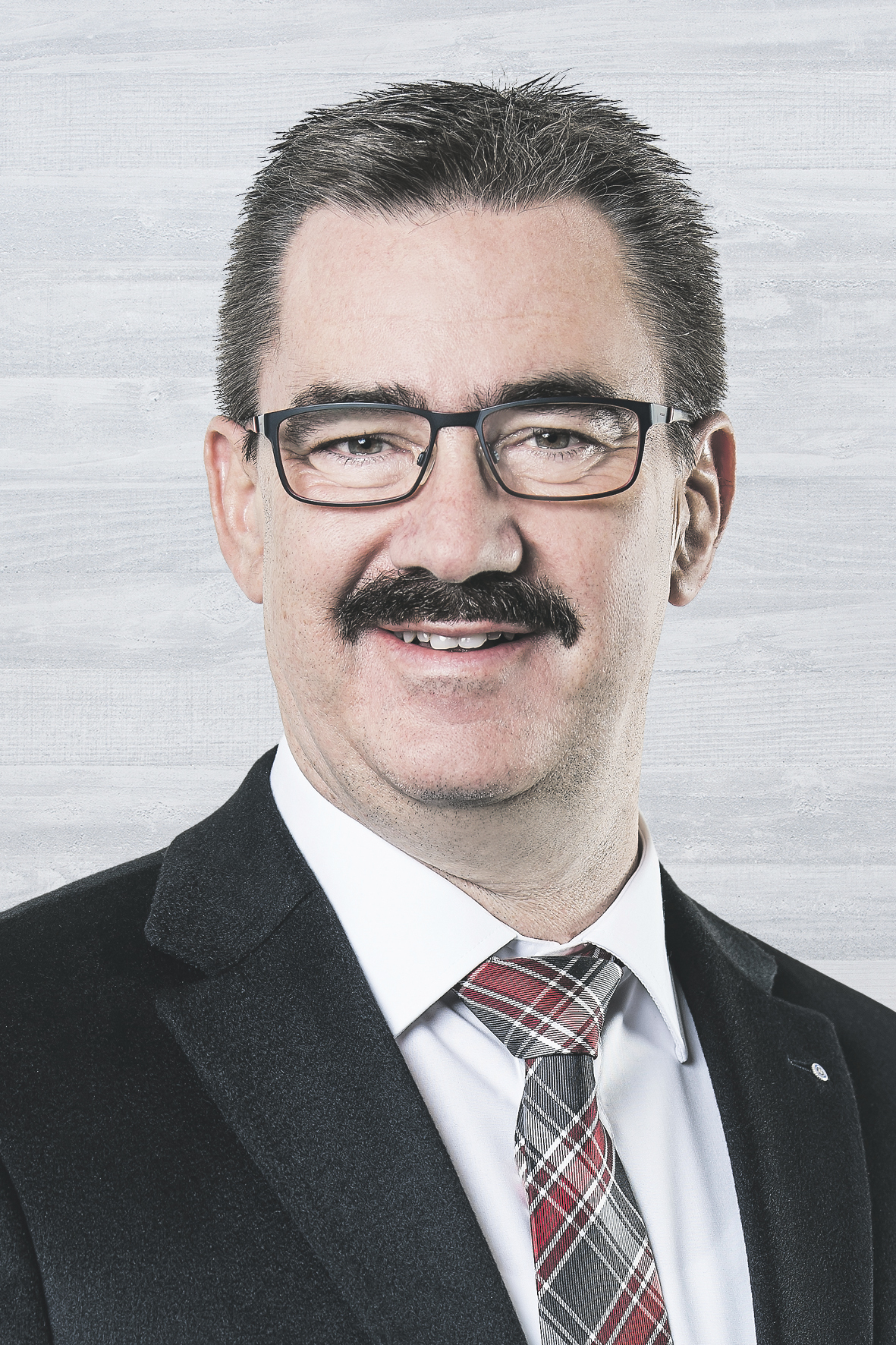
Robert Raths, mayor since 2020

Coat of arms of Rorschach

This is a list of mayors of Rorschach, Canton of St. Gallen, Switzerland. The mayor (Stadtpräsident) of Rorschach chairs the city council (Stadtrat). The term Stadtpräsident is used since 2001, before on used Stadtammann. Until 1918, the office was called Gemeindepräsident.

Mayor of Rorschach
Term	Mayor	Lifespan	Party	Notes
1803-1812	Anton Josef Zweifel	(-)	-	
1812-1828	Johaness Baumgartner	(-)	-	
1828-1832	Anton Hoffmann	(-)	-	
1832-1834	Martin Weber	(-)	-	
1834-1836	Nepomuk Bayer	(-)	-	
1834-1836	Dr. Karl Rothfuchs	(-)	-	
1836-1837	Aloys Albertis	(-)	-	
1837-1840	Franz Killian Gschwend	(-)	-	
1840-1845	Adrian Friederich	(-)	-	
1845-1853	Dr. Karl Rothfuchs	(-)	-	
1853-1856	Thadäus Baumgartner	(-)	-	
1856-1859	Albert Hoffmann	(-)	-	
1859-1860	Anton Josef Egger	(-)	-	
1860-1865	Johann Georg Pfister	(-)	-	
1865-1883	Notker Josef Eberle	(1826-1883)	-	
1883-1897	Ferdinand Hedinger	(1825-1903)	-	
1897-1909	Carl Hintermeister	(1845-1931)	FDP/PRD	
1909-1924	Arnold Engensperger	(1878-1924)	Konservative Partei	
1925-1948	Carl Rothenhäusler	(1890-1977)	FDP/PRD	
1948-1966	Ernst Grob	(1910-1984)	FDP/PRD	
1966-1984	Werner Müller	(1923-1984)	FDP/PRD	
1984-2003	Marcel Fischer	(born 1938)	CVP/PDC	
2003-2019	Thomas Müller	(born 1952)	CVP/PDC. From 2011 SVP/UDC	
2020-present	Robert "Röbi" Raths	(born 1961)	FDP/PLR	
