= August von Bayer =

German painter

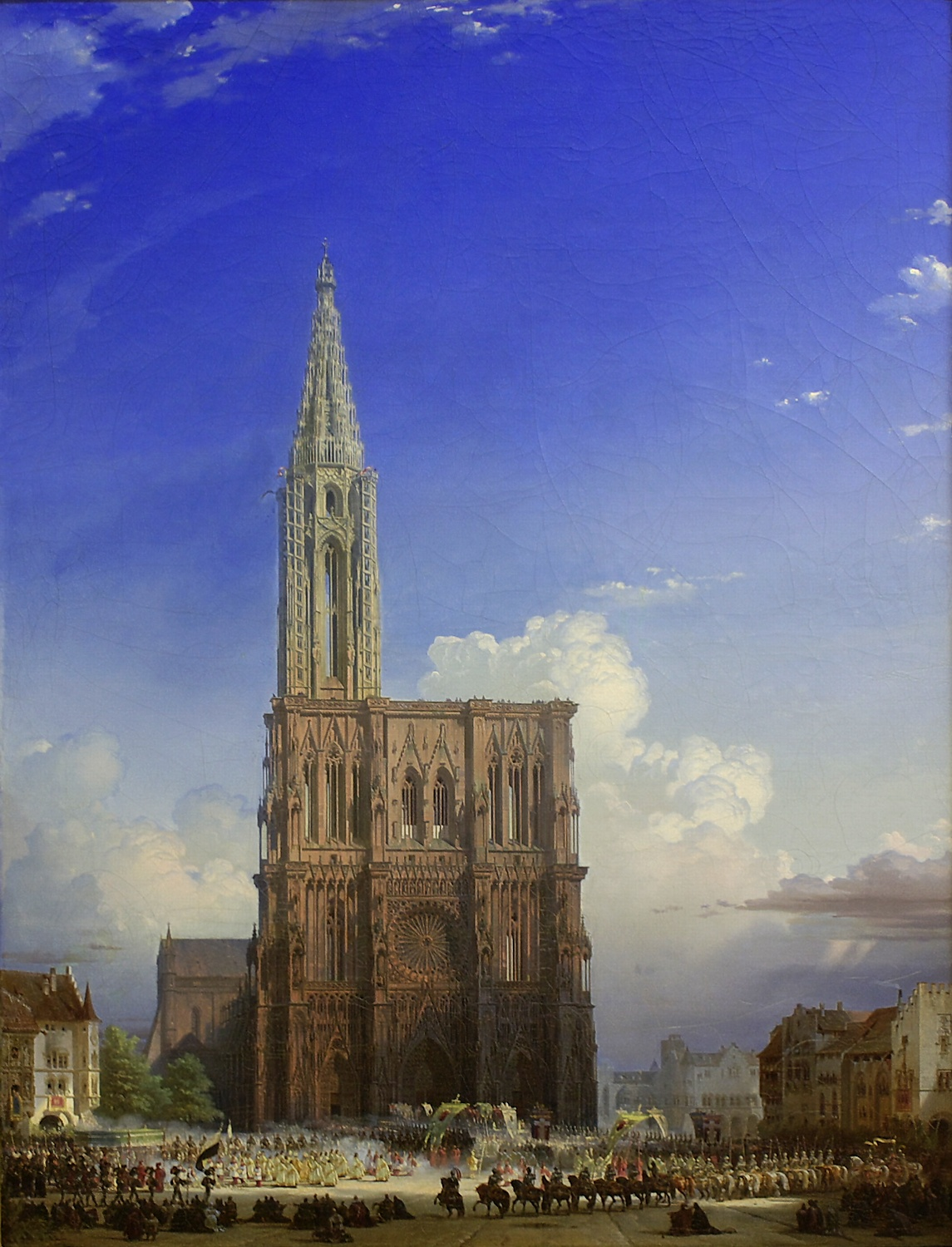
Das Strassburger Muenster im Mittelalter by August von Bayer

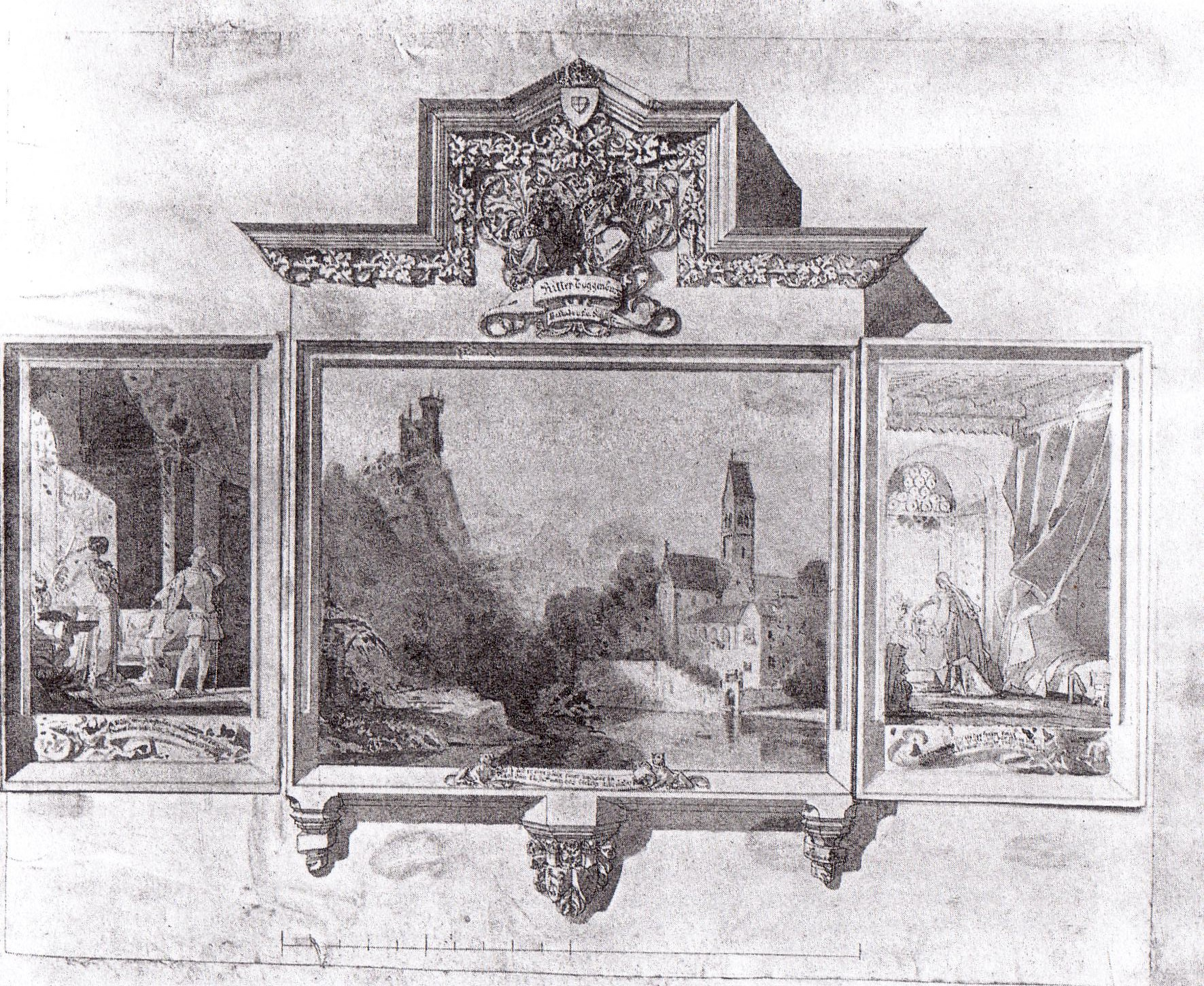
Ritter Toggenburg, a ballad by Friedrich Schiller. Drawing by Bayer in the Staatliche Kunsthalle Karlsruhe.

August von Bayer (1803–1875) was a German painter of architectural subjects

== Life ==
Bayer was born in May 1803 into a patrician Catholic family in Rorschach. He studied architecture under Weinbrenner, at Karlsruhe. In the mid-1820s he went to Munich, with the intention of pursuing a career in architecture, but soon turned to painting instead. His architectural education did, however provide him with a knowledge of construction rare amongst painters. He combined this knowledge with outstanding gifts as a colourist, which allowed him to tackle the most subtle effects of light.

In the early 1840s he moved to Baden-Baden, where his work came to the attention of a wider circle of prominent admirers, including Friedrich Wilhelm IV, King of Hanover, and Queen Augusta of Prussia. He spent the winters in Karlsruhe. In 1853 he was appointed him conservator of the monuments and antiquities in the Grand Duchy of Baden, a post to which he brought more of an aesthetic than a scientific outlook.

His last years were clouded by illness. He died in Karlsruhe on 2 February 1875.

== Works ==
Among his best works are:

- The interior of the Frauenkirche at Munich.
- A portion of the Cathedral at Chur.
- The Convent of Maulbronn.
- The Organ Player (lithographed hy Fr. Hohe).
- An interior of a Cloister (lithographed by Fr. Hohe) .

There are four works by him in the Pinakothek at Munich.

== See also ==
- List of German painters
