= Wilhelm Lamey =

German jurist

Wilhelm Friedrich Paul Hubert Lamey (2 March 1854 – 14 August 1910) was a jurist in the Baden civil service.

== Family ==
Born in Freiburg im Breisgau, Lamey was the son of August Lamey (27 July 1816 – 14 January 1896), Geheimer Rat and interior minister of Baden, and Maria Katharina née Dyckerhoff. Lamey married Karolina Mathilde Olga née Pierson of Balmadis (21 March 1866 - 29 August 1943), daughter of Waldemar Pierson and Anna Sophia née Weltzien on 4 July 1888 in Gaggenau. Lamey's marriage produced two children: Olga (21 April 1889 in Rastatt) and Leontine Pauline Sascha (5 August 1891 in Eppingen).

== Life ==
Lamey attended the Mannheim Gymnasium from 1866 to 1874 and passed his Abitur there. From the winter semester 1875/76, he studied law at the Ruprecht-Karls-Universität Heidelberg until 1878, interrupted by a study visit to Berlin in 1876/77. From 1880 to 1883, he worked as a trainee or referendar at various courts in Baden.

- Bernd Breitkopf: Die alten Landkreise und ihre Amtsvorsteher. Die Entstehung der Landkreise und Ämter im heutigen Landkreis Karlsruhe – Biographien der Oberamtmänner und Landräte von 1803 bis 1997. (Beiträge zur Geschichte des Landkreises Karlsruhe. Vol. 1). Verlag Regionalkultur, Ubstadt-Weiher 1997.

His first employment as an administrative assistant at the Bezirksamt Heidelberg was on 1 September 1883. Further stations were: from 1 January 1885, employed in the secretariat of the Ministry of the Interior; from 15 August 1886, administrative assistant at the Bezirksamt Karlsruhe; from 20 August 1886, administrative assistant at the Bezirksamt Karlsruhe; from 20 August 1886, administrative assistant at the Bezirksamt Karlsruhe. From 20 June 1887, he worked as an administrative assistant at the District Office Kehl; from October 1887, he worked as a temporary helper at the Administrative Court in Karlsruhe and finally, from 5 April 1888, he held the position of bailiff at the District Office Rastatt. From 15 October 1890 to 23 July 1892, he was Oberamtmann and head of office at the Bezirksamt Eppingen. He then fulfilled the same task at the Bezirksamt Ettlingen. On 17 July 1902, he was appointed Privy Councillor and finally retired early on 24 July 1902 due to illness.

Lamy died in Karlsruhe at the age of 56.

== Awards ==
- 1887 Prussian Landwehr-Dienstauszeichnung 2nd Class
- 1895 PrussianLandwehr-Dienstauszeichnung 1st Class
- 1899 Prussian Order of the Red Eagle 3. Class
- 1899 Ritterkreuz 1. Classe of the Order of the Zähringer Lion
