= Franz Krückl =

Austrian batirone

Franz Xaver Krückl, occasionally also Franz Krückel or Franz Krükl, (10 November 1841 – 12 January 1899) was an Austrian operatic baritone, stage actor, composer and music educator of Moravian origin.

== Life ==
Krückl was born on 10 November 1841 Nový Šaldorf-Sedlešovice, Moravia. Already as a child, Krückl sang in the church choir of his home village. On the recommendation of his town priest, he came to Vienna in 1851 to apply to the Hofkapelle. But only after two refusals he was appointed by decree of August 1855 as k.k. österreichischer Hofkapell-Sängerknaben. Parallel to the usual lessons at the Bundesgymnasium Wien 8, he learned to play the piano and violin and had singing lessons. He was also taught composition together with basso continuo and counterpoint.

Krückl's first attempts at theatre also date from this time at the grammar school; first in purely school events, later he also took on smaller extra roles in "real" productions. He was also deeply impressed by the model performances of the Hofkapelle and the Vienna Tonkünstler Society. These experiences led to Krückl's first compositions, including a mass, which was first performed on 8 November 1856 in the parish church of Klosterbruck, including Gradual and Offertory.

After obtaining his Matura (Abitur), Krückl began studying at the University of Vienna in 1858. In 1863, he completed his studies with a doctorate. Immediately afterwards, he found a job in the civil service. He resigned this position the following year and became a partner in a Viennese law firm.

As a member of the Akademischer Gesangverein, he took private singing lessons with the Hofkapellmeister Felix Otto Dessoff. He later took acting lessons with court actor Joseph Wagner. In 1868, Krückl resigned all his mandates and gave up his profession as a lawyer. With the help and support of his two teachers he was able to make his very successful debut as "Ashton" at the city theatre of Brno on 10 March 1868.

From there, he was brought to the Staatstheater Kassel, where he appeared for the first time on 12 May 1868. In 1871, Krückl changed to the Stadttheater Augsburg and worked there until 1874; occasionally he was a director. In June 1871, Krückl met his colleagues Ludwig Barnay and Ernst Gettke in Weimar to found the Guild of the German Stage.

In 1874, he went to the Hamburg State Opera for seven years. There, he made the acquaintance of Angelo Neumann, who engaged him for his travelling Wagner-Ensemble (between 1882 and 1883 over 130 Ring-performances in 58 cities).

In 1883, Krückl left Hamburg and settled in Frankfurt. There, he was entrusted with a teaching position at the Hoch Conservatory until 1892. In the summer of 1892, he became artistic director at the Strasbourg city theatre where he could celebrate his 25th anniversary on 12 May of the following year.

Shortly after his 58th birthday, Krückl died on 12 January 1899 in Strasbourg, where he also found his final resting place.

== Publications ==
- Das deutsche Theater und sein gesetzlicher Schutz. Eine Denkschrift. Genossenschaft Dt. Bühnenangehöriger, Berlin, 1882.

== Roles ==
- Ashton – Lucia di Lammermoor (Gaetano Donizetti)
- Carlos – Ernani (Giuseppe Verdi)
- Luna – Il trovatore (Giuseppe Verdi)

== Students ==
- Robert Bartram, Rudolf Moest
