= Ulrich of Saint Gall =

Ulrich of Saint Gall may refer to any of eight abbots:

- Ulrich I (984–990)
- Ulrich II (1072–1076)
- Ulrich of Eppenstein (1077–1121)
- Ulrich von Tegerfelden (1167–1199)
- Ulrich von Veringen (1199–1200)
- Ulrich von Sax (1204–1220)
- Ulrich von Güttingen (1272–1277)
- Ulrich Rösch (1463–1491)
