= Notker (abbot of Saint Gall) =

Abbot of St. Gall

Notker (died 15 December 975) was the abbot of the Abbey of Saint Gall from 971 to 975. Notker was recommended for the office of abbot by his predecessor Purchart I. His election occurred on 18 May 971. He was the nephew of Abbot Thieto and Abbot Craloh as well as of Notker the Physician.

Under Notker, the abbey's economy recovered. A testament of this recovery is the completion of the city walls that were commenced by his predecessor Anno. In order to improve the abbey's discipline and economy, Notker fell back on the constitution of Hartmut as well as on that of Abbot Kerbodo of Lorsch, the visiting abbot from the time of his predecessor Purchart. His severity knew limits however, wherefore he was named abba benignus ("gentle abbot"). The first testimony of Saint Gall's ministerials can also be ascribed to Notker's reign.

Notker reportedly established a small zoological garden to go along with the abbey's herb garden and orchard.

== See also ==
- Notker the Stammerer (c. 840 – 6 April 912)
- Notker Labeo (c. 950 – 28 June 1022)
