= Hiltbold von Werstein =

Hiltbold von Werstein (born before 1250; died 13 December 1329) was abbot of the Abbey of Saint Gall from 1318 until 1329 and in his capacity as domkustos, also librarian of the Abbey Library.

== Life and Works ==
Hiltbold von Werstein was the son of a baronial family whose seat was located in the upper Neckar valley. He is first mentioned as a monk in an Abbey document from 1279. He is said to have administered the courts of Gochain and Höchst in 1283 and he is recorded as thesaurarius. Together with Heinrich von Ramstein, he lodged complaint against King Rudolf along with a third monk. He is registered as custos in 1297 and as portarius from 1303. Like his predecessor Heinrich von Ramstein, he ran against Ulrich von Trauchburg in the election of 8 May 1318. The ministeriales supported Hiltbold, securing his victory in the election. The Constance auxiliary bishop Johannes performed Hiltbold's consecration.

Hiltbold did not receive the jura regalia, as he remained neutral and did not take sides for any claimants to the German throne. He did, however, get closer to the Habsburg party and received an assurance of assistance from Duke Leopold, documented in a treaty from the 30 June 1319. It is recorded that, on 17 November 1318, he ratified the Handfeste of Abbot Wilhelm from 1291. A document from 15 November 1323 reports the negotiations about a border dispute between Appenzell and Hundwil for which Hiltbold acted as mediator. It is also recorded that on 27 November 1325, Leopold of Austria arranged a settlement for a dispute with the family of Toggenburg in which the abbot was implicated against his will. Kuchimeister reports that Hiltbold spent the rest of his days after his abdication plagued by old age in Falkenstein Castle and subsequently Appenzell Castle. He was buried in the abbey's cloister.

Hiltbold's abbacy was characterized by many dispositions and pledgings, which suggests that the abbey was plagued by financial hardship. He was compelled by his old age to entrust his seal with a conventual, a ministerialis and a citizen, who took over his administerial functions by the end of 1325 or the beginning of 1326.
