= Heinrich von Twiel =

Heinrich von Twiel (died after 1133) was counter-abbot of the Abbey of Saint Gall from 1121 to 1122.

== Works ==
The imperially minded part of the convent in Saint Gall appointed Heinrich von Twiel as their abbot in 1121; however, the counter party declared the election invalid. They argued that Abbot Ulrich of Eppenstein's document of abdication, which would have necessitated a new election, was forged. Manegold von Mammern was ported as counter-abbot. In 1121, Conrad I, Duke of Zähringen, established Manegold in Saint Gallen by force. Heinrich fled to Castle Zell near Leutkirch in Swabia. Manegold von Mammern managed to convince Henry V that he had been lawfully elected Abbot of Saint Gall. After Manegold's imperial confirmation, Heinrich von Twiel withdrew to Zwiefalten Abbey. On the behest of Werinher, he returned to Saint Gall as provost in 1133, when Abbot Manegold died.
