= Ratbert =

Ratbert may refer to:

- Ratbert (character), from the comic strip Dilbert
- "Ratbert", poem from Victor Hugo's collection La Légende des siècles
- an alternative spelling of the given name Ratpert
