= Gozbert =

Gozbert may refer to:

- Gozbert (Saint Gall) (816-837), Abbot of the monastery of St. Gall
- Gozbert, the father of Hedan II
