= Clanx Castle =

Ruined castle in Appenzell Switzerland

- Ruine Clanx
- Appenzell
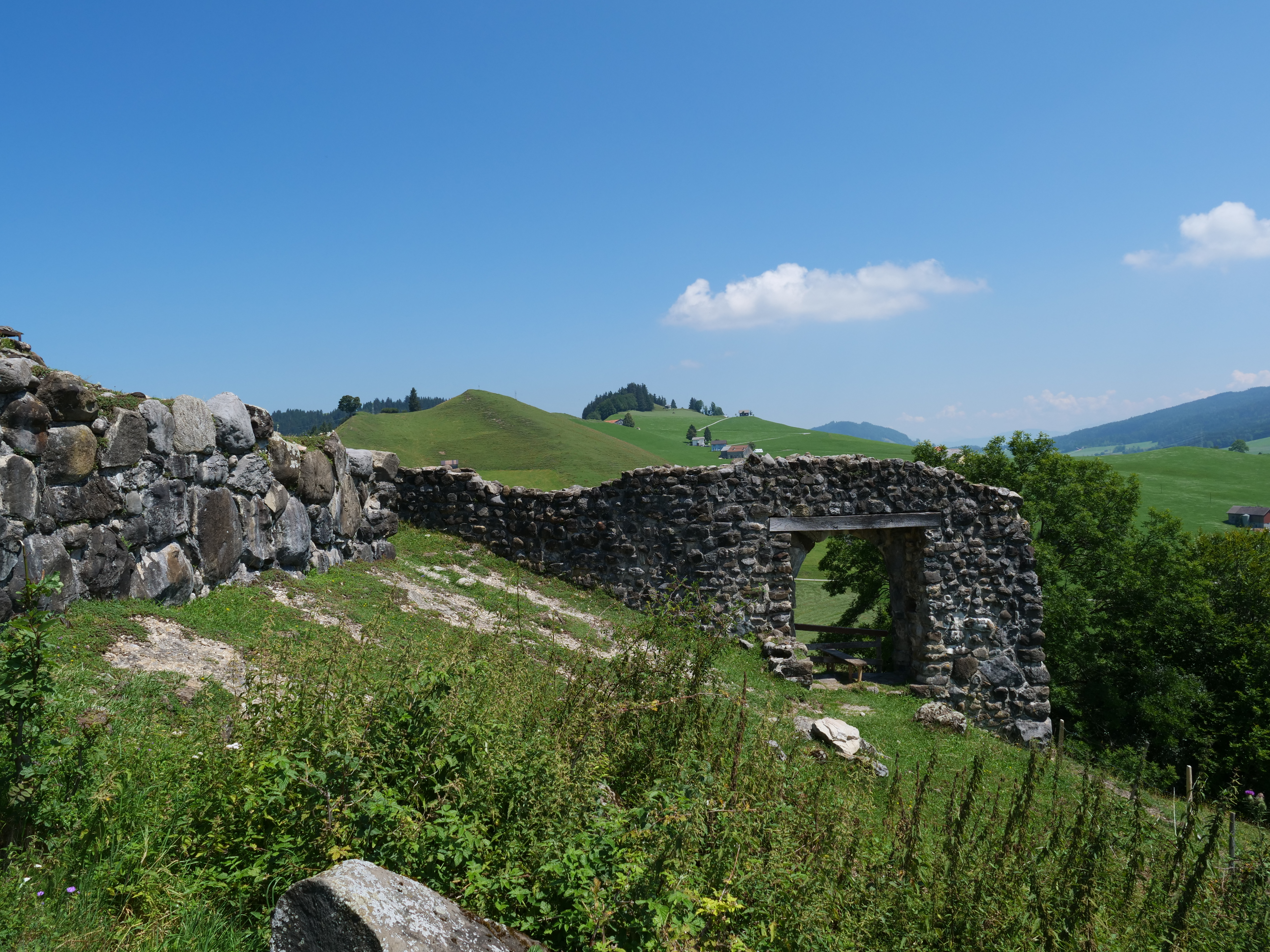

Site information
- Code: CH-AI
- Condition: ruin

Location
- Coordinates: 47°20′50″N 9°24′40″E
- Height: 1,004 m above the sea

Site history
- Built: 1219

Clanx Castle (German: Ruine Clanx) is a ruined castle in the Appenzell District of the canton of Appenzell Innerrhoden in Switzerland.

== History ==
The castle is first mentioned in 1219 as in arce Clanx, named after the Sax family holding in the Calanca valley. It was built by the Abbot of St. Gall Ulrich von Sax (1204–20) and his brother, the Abbey-Vogt Heinrich. The castle quickly became the center of the Abbey's lands in Appenzell. In 1236 Heinrich's uncle, the famous knight and minnesänger Heinrich III von Sax, took over the castle. During a contested election for Abbot of St. Gall in 1272, Ulrich von Güttingen received support from the Habsburgs in exchange for a promise to take the castle and lands away from the Sax family. Two years later, in 1274, Heinrich III was forced out and the Habsburg knight Ulrich von Ramschwag was given the castle. In 1277 Abbot Rumo von Ramstein traded Blatten Castle and other estates with Ulrich von Ramschwag, bringing Clanx back under the Abbey's control. In 1278 the Appenzellers revolted against the Abbot and unsuccessfully attacked Clanx. In 1289, the Habsburgs attacked Clanx in an attempt to gain control over Appenzell. After a six-week siege, the Habsburg forces paid the castle's defenders a bribe to open the castle gates. The defenders departed in peace and the castle was burned.

The Abbot was eventually victorious in the war against the Habsburgs. In 1298 he rebuilt Clanx Castle and continued to administer and control Appenzell from it. Over the following century the relationship between the Abbot and Appenzell worsened. In 1401 Appenzell revolted and began the Appenzell Wars. One of the first actions of the Appenzell army was to besiege and apparently quickly take Clanx. However, a few months later, the castle was back under the Abbot's control. In the following year a combined army from Appenzell and the city of St. Gallen attacked and captured Clanx. This time the victorious army decided to burn the castle before they left. After the Appenzell Wars, the Abbey retained control over the ruined castle and the hill on which it stood. In 1491, they sold the ruins and surrounding land to a private owner.

In 1885, the castle ruins were rediscovered during construction of a restaurant. The restaurant was completed, but destroyed in a storm in the same year. In 1949 the foundations of a strong square tower, a smaller corner tower on the highest point of the hill and parts of the walls were excavated.

== Castle site ==
Today the eastern half of the castle as well as part of the western wall have been excavated and repaired. The castle gate, south-east of the main tower, was reconstructed in 1949. The main tower is a large, square building 10.3 m × 10.15 m (33.8 ft × 33.3 ft) in size with walls that are up to 2 m (6.6 ft) thick.

== See also ==
- List of castles and fortresses in Switzerland
