= Lutold of Saint Gall =

Lutold was counter-abbot of the Abbey of Saint Gall from 1077 to about 1083. Nothing is known about his life before and after his work in Saint Gall. In the oldest lists of abbots, Lutold is missing.

== Works ==
During the conflict of the Investiture Controversy, the Counter-king Rudolf of Rheinfelden appointed Lutold as abbot of the Abbey of Saint Gall around Easter 1077. However, he was not accepted by the monks who took sides with Henry IV. In a deeply symbolic act, they broke the crosier and thus pointed to the illegitimacy of Lutold's abbacy. In September 1077, Henry IV had regained such a great influence that he appointed Ulrich of Eppenstein as abbot. Thereupon, Lutold fled to the Abbey of Reichenau. Further efforts to reestablish the counter-abbot Lutold in Saint Gall remained unsuccessful. In 1083, the counter-king Hermann of Salm appointed a monk from Reichenau, Werinhar, as counter-abbot in Saint Gall.

== Sources ==
- Lutold on the website of the Stiftsarchiv St. Gallen.
- Lutold in the Stadtlexikon Wil. Quoted after Duft, Johannes: Die Abtei St. Gallen.
