= Cölestin Gugger von Staudach =

Cölestin II. Gugger von Staudach
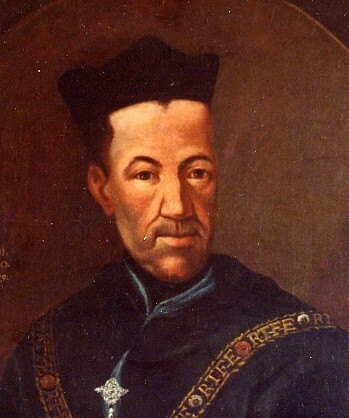
- Portrait drawing of Cölestin Gugger von Staudach by an unknown artist.
- Born: June 28, 1701; Feldkirch
- Died: February 24, 1767 (aged 65); St. Gallen
- Occupation: Prince-abbot
- Known for: Commissioning the St. Gallen Cathedral
- Title: Abbot of the Abbey of Saint Gall
- Term: 1740 – 1767
- Predecessor: Joseph von Rudolphi
- Successor: Beda Angehrn

Cölestin II. Gugger von Staudach (or Coelestin, born 28 June 1701 in Feldkirch as Michael Anton; died 24 February 1767 in Saint Gall) was from 23 March 1740 until his death prince abbot of the Abbey of Saint Gall. He is regarded as one of the most important abbots in the abbey's late period. He is attributed the solution of different long-lasting conflicts of the abbey, amongst others that with the Bishopric of Konstanz. The construction of the now world famous Saint Gall Cathedral was initiated and supervised by Cölestin, albeit he did not live to see its completion.

== Career ==
Cölestin Gugger von Staudach was born in 1701 to city councillor Michael Anton Gugger von Staudach and Maria Oexlin. First he visited the Jesuit school in Feldkirch, but in 1719 he changed over to the monastery school in Saint Gall. On 16 October 1721, he took his religious vows as Benedictine, and four years later he was already consecrated as priest. In 1726, Cölestin was moreover appointed professor of theology. On 18 October 1729, he travelled to Rome for study purposes and returned one year later with a doctoral degree. In the sequel, he held different offices in the monastery. Ultimately, he was elected abbot on 23 March 1740. He received the consecration on 19 September of the following year.

Father Bernhard Frank von Frankenberg, who had been Cölestin's rival in the election of the abbot, later became the Abbot of Disentis Abbey. Several times, Cölestin had to support him with staff and money, as the financial situation at Disentis Abbey was for a long time desolate.

== Works as prince abbot ==
When attempting to receive homage from his subject, it was denied him in Toggenburg. A number of unpleasant occurrences ensued. The Toggenburgers demanded from the new abbot that he continue the negotiations about the crew right (dt. "Mannschaftsrecht") which had been granted them by his predecessor Joseph von Rudolfi. With the intervention of Bern and (although showing little interest) Zurich, the abbot managed to receive the Toggenburgers' homage in due form in 1743. The first negotiated solution regarding the rights of the subject territory, however, was only attained in 1755 - in consequence of pressure from France. The final solution would take four more years to be achieved.

In several other parishes, Abbot Cölestin Gugger proved skill in solving conflicts on the path of negotiation, for instance when people in Rorschach were trying to rebel against the abbatial governance - on grounds of false accusations.

Another conflict that Cölestin encountered was with the Bishopric of Konstanz. The Bishopric had for historical reasons - the Abbey of Saint Gall officially belonged to the Bishopric - the right to make visitations to the Saint Gall parishes. Saint Gall had for a longer time been able to shirk these visitations, but the formal eviction of one of the bishopric's judicial vicars from the country was a final straw and the Bishopric complained. In the subsequent trial, first the court that was responsible for this conflict had to be defined. Saint Gall appealed to Rome, and Konstanz to the Aulic Council in Mainz. Ultimately, the conflict was settled in Rome by means of the exchange of lands (to Konstanz) for rights (to Saint Gall). However, later on federal troops still had to restore order several times as Saint Gall and Konstanz did not want to adhere to the new rules and, for example, did not present a newly elected chaplain to the abbot, but, as before, to the bishop.

From today's perspective, Cölestin's most important works were his representative edifices. In 1746, he began with the construction of the granary in Rorschach. On 29 April 1757, he laid the foundation of his most significant work, the new construction of the Abbey of Saint Gall. The building itself was constructed in two stages and finished in 1767; the completion of the interior, however, took much more time. The abbey received its final consecration only in 1867, long after the abolishment of the monastery. Simultaneously with the abbey, Cölestin also had a new library built. The baroque hall of the abbey library of Saint Gall is reckoned one of the world's most beautiful profane halls. Together, the abbey and the library cost 457'929 guilder. Cölestin was also an able businessman who knew how to skilfully utilise the abbey's sources of money. Despite the significant expenses of his construction work as well as trials and jura regalia, he was able to pay back the entire debt that he had inherited from his predecessor and furthermore bequeath his successor 180'600 guilder in cash and 57'695 guilder as capital.

== Historical account ==
Ildefons von Arx writes about Cölestin Gugger von Staudach:

"Prince abbot Cölestin Gugger was generally respected and loved, as he adequately combined earnestness and kindness, force and compliance. He conducted business with much circumspection and counsel, and in particular because the state of public affairs was favourable, he succeeded in almost all. He thus gained a substantial reputation among his contemporaries and he was called upon for advice from all kinds of places. His diaries and his intentions for his life and regency, written down as mental exercise, testify to a rigorous piety and make one wonder how a prelate so much involved in business could maintain such a distinct spirituality. Without appearing economical, he merely suggested, employing close supervision and avoiding any unnecessary costs, a yearly 34 fl., which enabled him to free the monastery from the debt that it had held for four hundred years. Furthermore, he was able to buy Wartensee with 12.000 fl. and Castle Roggwil, Hefenhofen and Moos with 29.912fl., to found trusts for 40.000 fl., to use 59.487 fl. for trials, 12.000 fl. for confirmation, benediction and the reception of fiefs, to spend 37.050 fl. on trade and to the advantage of the country, to build the granary in Rorschach in the year 1746, after the crack of the Italia Bognato, and to spend 457.929 fl. to build the 312 feet long Saint Gall Cathedral, a part of the monastery and the clubhouse in St. Fiden and still bequeath 300.000 fl."

— V. Arx III.: Geschichten des Kantons St. Gallen. S. 566–614

== Reading list ==
- Von Arx, Ildefons: Geschichten des Kantons St. Gallen. Zollikofer & Züblin, St. Gallen 1813, p. 566 et sqq.
