= Werinhar =

Werinhar was counter-abbot of the Abbey of Saint Gall from 1083 to 1086. Nothing is known about his life before and after his work in Saint Gall. He is documented neither in the obituary of Saint Gall nor in that of Reichenau.

== Works ==
In the course of the Investiture Controversy, Counter-king Hermann of Salm replaced Lutold, who had been appointed as counter-abbot of Saint Gall by Hermann's predecessor Rudolf of Rheinfelden, with Werinhar, a monk from Reichenau. Subsequently, Ekkehart, the Abbot of Reichenau tried repeatedly to establish Werinhar in Saint Gall. However, Werinhar actually only presided over the abbey for a short time, probably around the year 1086, when Abbot Ulrich of Eppenstein, who had been appointed by King Henry IV, assumed the Patriarchate of Aquileia. Apparently, he was so heavily pressured by Ulrich's followers in Saint Gall that he voluntarily abdicated that same year.
