= Rumo =

Rumo may refer to:

== People ==
- Rumo von Ramstein (died ca. 1300), German abbot

== Places ==
- Rumo, Nigeria, town in Sumaila
- Rumo, Trentino, Italy
- RUMO Plant, Nizhny Novgorod, Russia

== Other ==
- Rumo, title character of Rumo and His Miraculous Adventures
- Rumo S.A., Brazilian logistics company
