= Eglolf Blarer =

Swiss abbot

Eglolf Blarer (born in Konstanz; died 20 May 1442) was abbot of the Abbey of Saint Gall from 1426 to 1442.

== Life ==
Eglolf descended from the important middle-class Blarer trade family who were initially native to Saint Gall, but had for one generation been living in Konstanz. He was a monk in Saint Blaise Abbey holding the offices of Grosskeller and prior. Pope Martin V appointed him Abbot of Saint Gall at the end of 1426 or at the beginning of 1427. Eglolf is first documented holding office on 25 January 1427.

"In 1436, he received the prerogative from the Council in Basel to let himself be consecrated by any bishop or abbot, should the ordinary (dt. "Ordinarius") refuse to consecrate him, as well as the prerogative to autonomously decide on vicars for the parishes of the city who were juridically subordinated to the abbot and the convent."

Emperor Sigismund confirmed on 28 November 1430 the prerogatives as well as the fiefs and rights, and so did his successor, Albert II, on 3 July 1439.

== Works ==
The abbey's financial distress made the abbot ask the papal chamber for a deferral of the payment of fees. The troubles with Appenzell (dt. "Appenzellerwirren"), which consisted of a dispute that had begun under Abbot Kuno von Stoffeln and culminated in the Appenzell Wars and had remained unresolved for more than two decades, were also solved under Blarer. Defeated by Count Friedrich VII von Toggenburg in 1428, the Appenzeller became amenable to negotiations. On 26 July 1429, the Bishop of Konstanz, the St.-Jörgen-Bund and the Abbot of Saint Gall made peace with the Appenzeller. This peace corresponded quite closely to the award of the seven villages in 1421 under Abbot Heinrich von Mansdorf.

Under Abbot Eglolf, the troubles with Appenzell as well as the Old Zurich War came to an end, whereupon, on 18 May 1437, the abbot agreed upon a land law with Schwyz lasting 20 years. Therein, the political reorientation of the abbey towards the Swiss Confederation manifested itself for the first time.

On 16 March 1427 and 28 September 1429, Abbot Eglolf again confirmed the rights and liberties of the cities Wil and Saint Gall.

Apparently, his endeavours were furthermore directed towards the inner structure of the abbey. To this end, he summoned the monks of Hersfeld Abbey who belonged to the congregation of Bursfeld. He abolished the monks' proprietary possession in accordance with the Rule of Saint Benedict, annulled the benefice organisations (dt. "Pfründenorganisationen") of the monastery offices and reestablished the communal life.

Eglolf is supposed to have repaired the convent buildings that had been demolished in the fire in 1418. Moreover, he is said to have begun the construction of a new chorus in 1439, which, however, could not be finalised, and to have established the monastery school.

In 1440, he removed the monks from Herdfeld again, as they tried by means of a visitation of the Council of Basel to also obligate the Abbot to a stricter order. In their stead, he summoned monks from Kastl Abbey.

== Reading list ==
- Gössi, Anton: Kurzbiographien der Äbte. in: Johannes Duft, Anton Gössi, and Werner Vogler (eds.): Die Abtei St. Gallen. St. Gallen 1986, p. 146–47.
