= Franz von Gaisberg =

Abbot of St. Gall (1465–1529)

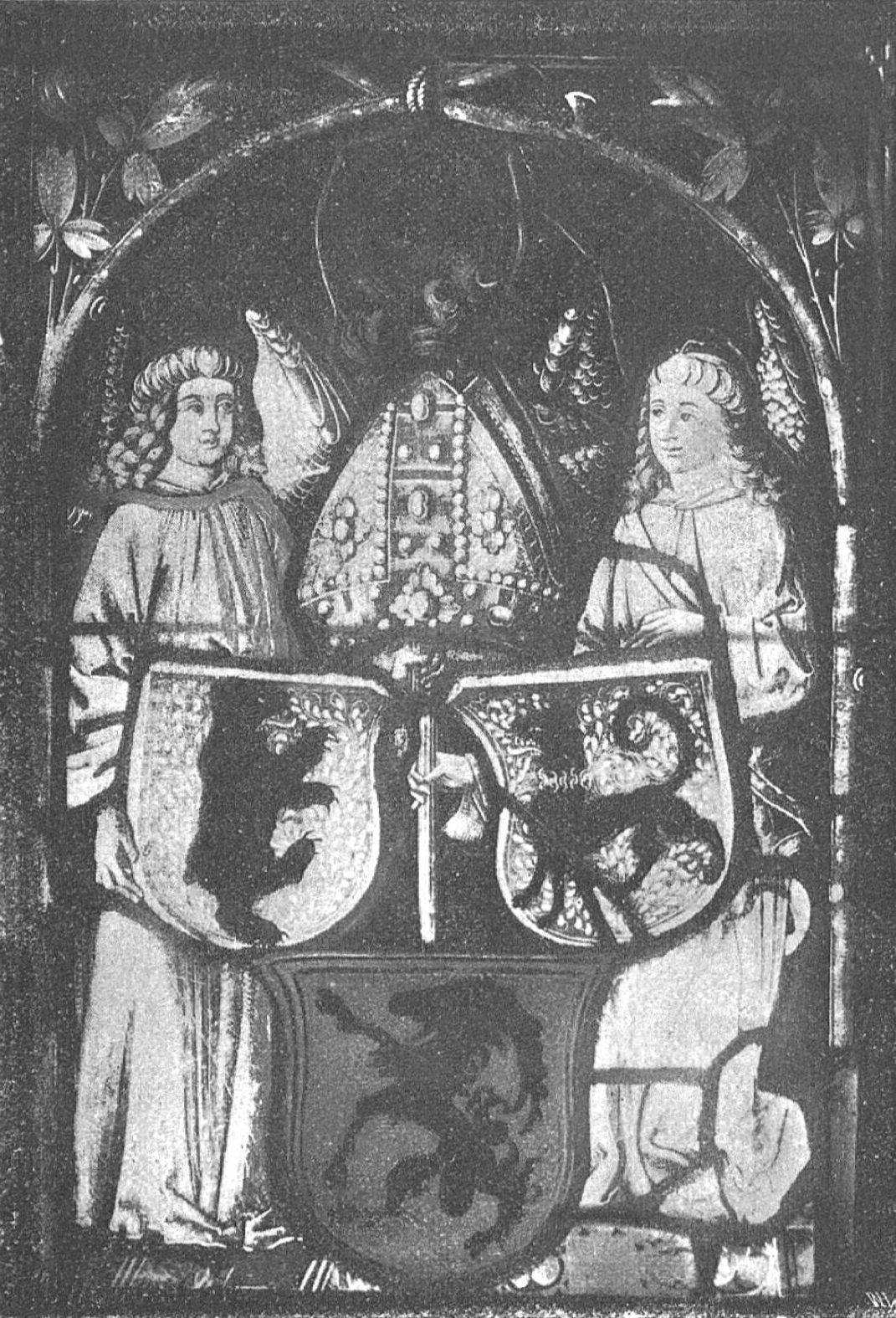
Coat of arms of Franz von Gaisberg

Franz von Gaisberg (1465 – 23 March 1529) was librarian from 1491 to c. 1496 and abbot of the Abbey of Saint Gall from 1504 to 1529.

== Life ==
He was born in Konstanz. Franz von Gaisberg's father, Anton, first served the Austrians and then the French. His mother, Verena Hux, was the daughter of a wealthy Saint Gall weaver. Later, Franz von Gaisberg built a funeral chapel for his parents in the Abbey of Saint Gall, the so called Gaisberg chapel. Between 1477 and 1482, he took his religious vows. On 20 August 1488, he is first mentioned as priest. In 1491, he was probably domkustos; from 11 June 1496 onwards, he is attested as subprior. On 19 April 1504, when he held the office of acting subdean, he was elected abbot. Like his predecessor Gotthard Giel von Glattburg, he travelled to Rome for the papal confirmation. He received it on 12 June 1504, the correspondent consecration was given to him by Bishop Titus Veltri of Castri in the church of Santa Maria dell’Anima.

== Activities ==
During the first months of his term of office, Abbot Franz had to deal with a dispute between the prince abbey and the city of Wil. Pope Julius II settled this dispute on 3 June 1505 and regulated the rights of both parties very precisely. Abbot Franz aimed for an active acquisition policy. In 1505, he purchased the castle on the Rosenberg near Berneck and the property belonging to it for 5350 gulden from Junker Gallus Muntprat. In 1510, he bought the judicial rights of Balgach from Abbess Amalia von Lindau. From Jakob Blarer von Wartensee, he bought the tithe of Buchen and Staad in 1520. His economical policy provided the abbey with a solid financial base. Regarding cultural and religious matters, Franz achieved the canonisation of Notker the Stammerer as well as the endowment of the minster. He let the organ be refurbished, paintings be produced, new choir stalls be built and he bought precious mass drapery.

As ally of the Swiss Confederancy, the Prince Abbot of Saint Gall was involved in its politics with regard to wars and alliances. In the context of the Italian Wars, the prince abbot first received papal pensions as well as papal confirmations of prerogatives. Thus, Leo X confirmed the incorporation of Rorschach, St. Margrethen, Höchst and Bernang into the prince abbot's jurisdiction in 1512. After the defeat at Marignano in 1515, Abbot Franz appeared as French party member. He received a French pension of 4000 francs.

Driven by reformatory ideas, several riots occurred in the prince abbey's territory from 1520 onwards. In the course of the Peasant Revolts, on 1 May 1525, the subjects of the upper office (dt. "Oberes Amt") expressed their requests in articles in Lömmerschwil. In the Rapperswil contract from 17 July 1525, the standpoint of the abbey was largely accepted, however, soon after, the unrest in connection to the reformatory ideas developed a hardly controllable dynamic. In the late summer of 1527, the abbot left Saint Gall and fled first to Wil where the new belief had not yet managed to gain a foothold. The increasing unrest eventually forced him to retreat to the Abbey of Rorschach and afterwards to Castle Saint Anna in Rorschach where he was besieged by rebellious subjects. In Saint Gall, Joachim Vadian and Dominik Zili meanwhile implemented the reformation. On 23 February 1529, an iconoclasm took place in Saint Gall. Abbot Franz died on 23 March 1529 in Rorschach.
