= Hermann von Bonstetten =

Hermann von Bonstetten (before 1314 – 23 August 1360) was abbot of the Abbey Saint Gall from 1333 to 1360.

== Life ==
Hermann von Bonstetten was a descendant from the Zurich stirps of the baronial family von Bonstetten. Since 1314, he is documented as novice and conventual in Einsiedeln Abbey. On 25 October 1333, Pope John XXII appointed him as administrator and already on 14 December of the same year Hermann was appointed abbot. Three days later (17 December 1333) he received permission to let himself be consecrated by any prelate. Hermann's political loyalty belonged to the party of the Pope who had appointed him. He also called on Hermann to back the newly elected Bishop von Konstanz against Emperor Louis IV. When the Pope died, however, Hermann changed sides and supported the emperor, and on 10 March 1335, Louis already confirmed the prerogatives and all other fiefs and privileges, as is stated in records.

As is documented on 9 June 1344, Hermann succeeded in redeeming an important bailiwick including many localities that was impawned by the Counts von Werdenberg for 600 mark. To achieve the redemption of this bailiwick, he had to borrow 630 mark from the citizens of Saint Gall and offer Clanx Castle as security. The successor of Louis, King Charles IV, confirmed this deal on 1 May 1345 and raised the pledge sum to 1200 mark. Charles also granted Hermann the prerogatives again on 14 February 1348 and confirmed his mortgage of Appenzell on 16 February. Moreover, Charles additionally subdued Appenzell by means of a market and customs privilege. Thereby, the extension of the abbot's rule in Appenzell was completed.

Under Hermann, the city of Saint Gall continued to pursue independence. Hermann had to yield already at the beginning of his regency: on 9 May 1334, he confirmed the Handfeste (a document to secure a certain right) of Abbot Wilhelm. In 1344, he awarded the Ungeld (a consumption tax) and enabled the counsel to do dimensional checks and raise monetary fines. When the citizens demanded, in 1353, that they be allowed to use the parish acres to bleach linen, Hermann had to yield again. He used his rights over the city which Charles IV had confirmed during a visit in the same year for the purchase of relics only formally. One year later, in 1354, it is documented that the city for the first time elected a mayor whom they appointed chairman of the counsel. Pope Clement VI confirmed the prerogatives, granted by the Roman Curia, on 7 October 1352 and to his successor, Pope Innocent VI on 5 February 1353.

== Works ==
The caretaker and provost Ulrich von Enne is documented together with Hermann von Bonstetten - without apparent reason - in 1346 and 1347. The abbot celebrated mass in Wil and made donations to the hospital in Saint Gall and the leprosarium near Linsebühl which, according to Anton Gössi, shows his benignancy and his religious mind.

== Reading list ==
- Gössi, Anton: Kurzbiographien der Äbte. in: Johannes Duft, Anton Gössi, and Werner Vogler (eds.): Die Abtei St. Gallen. St. Gallen 1986, p. 141.
