= Ulrich II =

Ulrich II may refer to:

- Ulrich II. (St. Gallen) († 1076) Abbot of St. Gall
- Ulrich II, Duke of Carinthia (c. 1176 – 1202)
- Ulrich II, Count of Württemberg (c. 1254 – 1279)
- Ulrich II von Graben (before 1300 – about 1361)
- Ulrich II, Count of Celje (1406–1456)
- Ulrich II, Duke of Mecklenburg-Stargard (1428–1471)
- Ulrich II, Count of East Frisia (1605–1648)
