= Werinher =

Werinher (died 6 July 1167) was abbot and librarian of the Abbey of Saint Gall from 1133 to 1167. He is first documented in March 1134.

== Works ==
Werinher was custos and became the abbot of the Abbey of Saint Gall after 1 May 1133. After tumultuous decades with elections of counter-abbots, the election was held remarkably peacefully, as the chronicles emphasise. Werinher directed his administration to the reform of monastic life. Some monks, who did not adhere to his standards of monastic discipline, were reported by him to the papal legate Cardinal Theodwin in 1134. This rigid policy of reinstating discipline evoked resistance on the part of the monks, but the inter-monastic differences could soon be reconciled. On 12 April 1139, Werinher received the confirmation of privileges and properties from Pope Innocent II. In 1145, he renewed the existing fraternity with the Abbey of Reichenau. As constructor, he built the churches Saint Leonhard and Saint Egidius which Pope Eugene III put under his protection on 13 February 1152. In 1162, Werinher was able to acquire Ittingen Charterhouse from Duke Welf von Ravensburg. As the duke's protecting reeve, Count Udalrich von Gamertingen, died without heirs, the Vogtei came into the possession of Saint Gall. However, it was later sold by Abbot Werinher to Count Rudolf von Pfullendorf for 300 silver marks.
