= Konrad von Pegau =

Konrad von Pegau (before 1418 – 1423) was abbot of the Abbey of Saint Gall from 1418 to 1419.

== Life ==
Pope Martin V assigned the Abbey of Saint Gall to Konrad von Pegau in 1418, after the dismissal of Abbot Heinrich von Gundelfingen, who had fallen from grace because of the lack of reforms. Konrad von Pegau had distinguished himself at the Council of Konstanz by his scholarliness and his enthusiasm for reform. Pegau is situated in the Bishopric Merseburg.

Konrad von Pegau however soon asked the Pope to release him again from the task of administering the abbey. The state of things in Saint Gall was too discouraging, the more so as, only recently, a fire had raged in the abbey. The Pope condescended to Konrad's wish and on 15 March 1419, he announced this to the vassals of the monastery and simultaneously made Heinrich von Mansdorf the new abbot. Konrad's reign lasted ten months; he is once documented as abbot - on 23 January 1419.

== Sources ==
- Erhart, Peter. 2008: "Konrad von Pegau". Historisches Lexikon der Schweiz.
- Gössi, Anton: Kurzbiographien der Äbte. in: Johannes Duft, Anton Gössi, and Werner Vogler (eds.): Die Abtei St. Gallen. St. Gallen 1986, p. 145.
