= Ratpert =

Ratpert (also spelled Radpert, Ratbert or Radbert) is a masculine Germanic given name. It may refer to:

- Ratpert (abbot of Saint Gall) (d. 782)
- Ratpert of Nonantola (d. 839?), abbot
- Radbert of Corbie (d. 865), Frankish theologian and writer
- Ratbertus (bishop of Valence) (fl. 858–879), founder of Charlieu Abbey
- Ratpert of Saint Gall (d. c. 911), Benedictine historian and poet
