= Gozbert of Saint Gall =

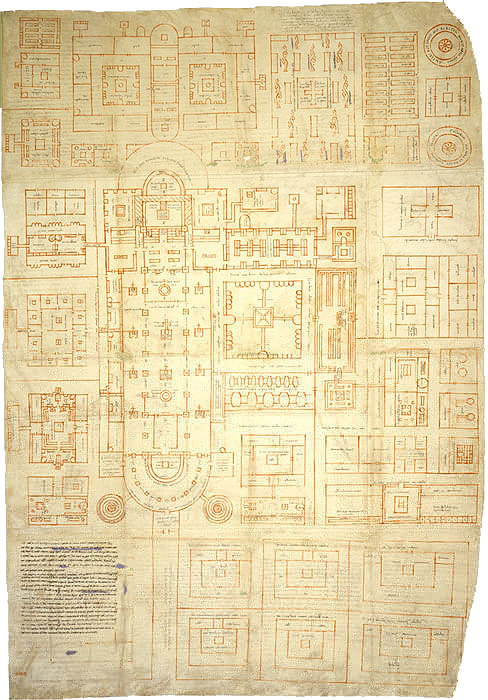
The Plan of Saint Gall, depicting a model monastery around 800

Gozbert (died 4 April 850 (?) in Rheinau) was abbot of the Abbey of Saint Gall from 816 until 837 and also abbot of Rheinau Abbey until 850. The beginning of his term of office in Rheinau is unknown.

== Life and works ==
As monk of Saint Gall, Gozbert is documented as deacon in 798, as priest in 811 and as dean between 813 and 816. In the year 816, he was elected abbot. He succeeded in loosening the dependency of the Abbey of Saint Gall from the Bishopric of Konstanz to which the town Saint Gall belonged. On 3 June 818, he received immunity from Emperor Louis the Pious, which was later confirmed by Louis the German. Moreover, Gozbert was assured of the continuing free election of the abbot in the monastery; a privilege that had, less than a hundred years before, cost the founder of the monastery, Otmar, his freedom.

Gozbert focused on the expansion of the monastery estate. His acquisitions and the donations he received were a significant foundation for the future prince abbey. Gozbert centralised the administration of the monastery property and reformed the documentary management as the profession of registrar was regarded as a stepping stone to a better position in the monastery. Under Gozbert's regency, Saint Gall became a cultural centre, as many still existing documents from his time affirm. He also paid special attention to the abbey library, and had close ties to one of the main scribes there, Wolfcoz.

Gozbert was the recipient (and employer?) of the Plan of Saint Gall which was made around 820 in Reichenau. How closely his monastery actually resembled this ideal plan is unknown. What is known, however, is that the building process began with the new construction of the Basilica of Gall (Gallusbasilika) in 830, which was sanctified after 835 in the presence of the Bishops Ulrich I. von Basel, Wolfleoz von Konstanz and Erlebald von Reichenau.

In the year 837, Gozbert resigned from his office as abbot. Possibly, this was due to political uncertainties in which the monastery had become involved when the sons of Louis the Pious struggled over his succession.

In the literature, the following career is stated:

"As first abbot, [in Rheinau Abbey] in the middle of the 9th century, we encounter Gozbert who was summoned from Saint Gall by Wolfene. He is followed by Antwart, Wolfen, the restorer of the monastery († 878), Wichram; ..."

Gozbert's exact year of death is not known. It is possible that he died in relation to his successor Anwarth's assumption of office in Rheinau in the year 850.

== Reading list ==
- Gössi, Anton: St. Gallen - Äbte: Gozbert, 816-837. in: Helvetia Sacra. III: Die Orden mit Benediktinerregel. 1/2: Frühe Klöster, die Benediktiner und Benediktinerinnen in der Schweiz. Francke Verlag, Bern 1986, p. 1272-73.
- Duft, Johannes: Gozbert (Cozpert). in: Neue Deutsche Biographie (NDB). Vol 6, Duncker & Humblot, Berlin 1964, p. 692.
- Meyer von Knonau, Gerold: Gozbert, Abt von St. Gallen. in: Allgemeine Deutsche Biographie (ADB). Vol 9, Duncker & Humblot, Leipzig 1879, p. 523.

== Notes and references ==
Preceded by Wolfleoz	Abbot of St. Gall; 816–837	Succeeded by Bernwig
