= Pius Reher =

Prince and Abbot of saint Gal

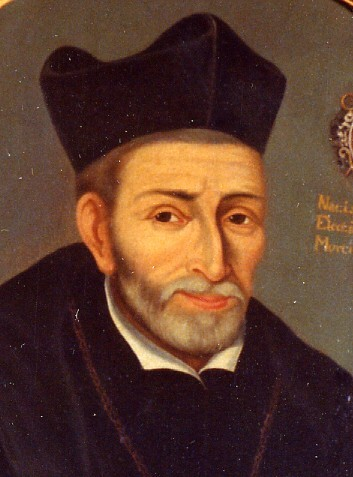
Pius Reher

Pius Reher (born 1597 in Blönried as Simon; died 9 December 1654) was abbot of the benedictine monastery of Saint Gall and prince-abbot of the Princely Abbey of Saint Gall from 1630 until 1654.

== Life ==
Pius Reher was born in Blönried near Weingarten into modest circumstances. His parents were Martin Reher and Anna Lang. He took his vows on 10 August 1614. He studied in Ingolstadt and from 1621 in Dillingen, where he ultimately received the title of magister. He was already subdeacon at the time and became deacon on 10 April 1621. He became priest on 24 September 1622. He was acting as subprior, instructor fratrum, and eventually as novice master. His election as abbot took place in the presence of the nuncio on 15 April 1630. Pope Urban VIII confirmed him on 16 December 1630. The Nuncio Ranuccio Scotti gave him the blessing on 3 May 1631 in Einsiedeln. He was abbot during the Thirty Years' War.

== Works ==
=== Thirty Years' War ===
During the Thirty Years' War, tensions arose on the borders of the princely Abbey. Abbot Pius was confronted with requests for the permission of marching through his territories. He granted the requests to Henri, Duke of Rohan and in the same year to the imperial people as well. He subsequently formed a military alliance with Philip IV of Spain.

=== Successes ===
Pius Reher consolidated the Abbey's rights in treaties with the citizens of Wil, St. Gallen and Appenzell. He settled questions of tithes and other issues with the city of Wil in several treaties from 1650–1654. Between 1652 and 1654, the bodies of various catacomb saints were transferred to the Abbey in solemn processions. Pius chose the income of the parishes of Grub and Goldach to finance the acquisitions of the Abbey library. He expanded the curriculum of the Gymnasium of Rorschach – founded by his predecessor, Abbot Bernhard – by introducing courses on philosophy and theology. The Abbey printing works, which had been active since 1635, were translocated from St. Johann to Saint Gall. These expenditures led him to amass considerable debt. His successor, Abbot Gallus Alt, was then faced with the task of dealing with that debt.

=== Reform Efforts ===
Thanks to his strong reform efforts he was appointed protector of the monasteries of Salem and Kempten. His religious zeal is beyond doubt, as is his reform ethos. Nonetheless, he was well familiar with the doctor and mayor of the city of St. Gallen, Sebastian Schobinger.
