= Konrad von Bussnang =

Konrad von Bussnang (died December 20, 1239) was abbot of the Abbey of Saint Gall from 1226 to 1239. He descended from the barons von Bussnang from the Canton of Thurgau. He is first mentioned in records as provost in 1221.

== Works ==
Konrad was elected the new abbot by the conventuals of Saint Gall immediately after they had received the news of Abbot Rudolf von Güttingen's death (1226 in Rome). The rapid electoral procedure should prevent the interference of the ministeriales. Abbot Konrad had his election confirmed by King Henry VII in Überlingen. He purchased the lien for the monastery's bailiwick for 600 mark, whereby he wanted to prevent Count Hartmann von Kyburg's buying parts of it. He concentrated his duties on reducing the debt from his predecessor's, Rudolf von Güttingen's, reign. By means of an enforced additional tax, he was able to satisfy the creditors, a consortium of Italian merchants.

Being a loyal supporter of the Staufer family, Konrad became one of the most important advisers to King Henry VII after 1228, who, in thanks, gave him a farm near Kriessern. The bonds of loyalty were broken when Henry VII challenged Emperor Frederick II. Henceforth, Abbot Konrad belonged to the party that was loyal to the emperor. As a reward, the emperor supported Konrad's ambitions as heir of Friedrich von Toggenburg. Since the latter had been killed by his brother Diethelm II von Toggenburg, his parents transferred the property of Toggenburg and the city of Wil to the Abbot of Saint Gall. A conflict ensued about the heritage of Toggenburg that lasted for years and was finally, in 1236, decided by Emperor Frederick II in favour of the abbot .

Konrad von Bussnang maintained a costly household that, together with his war against Count Diethelm II von Toggenburg, devoured a considerable amount of money. He collected the necessary means from his subjects. When a number of Saint Gall's discontented citizens wanted to unite with the people from Appenzell, he had the houses of fifteen citizens torn down. Due to this uncompromising tax policy and his skilful acquisition policy, which was legally secured by a papal document on 5 May 1234, the abbey was free from debt at the end of his reign. Abbot Konrad died on 20 December 1239 and was entombed in Salem Abbey.
