= Heinrich von Klingen =

Heinrich von Klingen (died 16 December 1204) was abbot of the Abbey of Saint Gall from 1200 until 1204.

== Works ==
Heinrich von Klingen was elected abbot of Saint Gall from his position of provost on 17 January 1200. For the first time in the Abbey's history, the ministeriales and the whole citizenry was involved in the election. Abbot Heinrich was successful in his endeavour of repaying the debts amassed by his predecessor Ulrich von Veringen. He bought back many properties which had previously been pledged or sold. Heinrich von Klingen was an associate of King Philip. The king confirmed his abbacy in Ulm in the year 1200. Heinrich participated in a number of Hoftage. In 1201, he was at the Hoftag in Bamberg, in 1202 at the Hoftage in Esslingen and Ulm, and in 1203 in Ravensburg.
