= Wolfleoz =

Wolfleoz von Konstanz, or Wolleozzus (first mentioned in 811; died on 15 March 838 or 839 in Konstanz) was bishop of the Bishopric of Konstanz from 811 to 838/39 and abbot of the Abbey of Saint Gall from 812 to 816.

== Works ==
=== Bishop of Konstanz ===
Wolfleoz became Bishop of Konstanz after Egino's death in 811. In 816, he participated in the translation of relics of Trudpert who was worshipped as a martyr. Probably on this occasion, Wolfleoz also sanctified the newly built minster in St. Trudpert. That same year, he moreover contributed to the inauguration of the abbey church of the Abbey of Reichenau, newly constructed under Abbot Haito. In 829, Wolfleoz attended the synod in Mainz that was convened by Louis the Pious. In 835, he was co-consecratorof the monastery basilica in Saint Gall built under Abbot Gozbert.

=== Abbot of Saint Gall ===
After Abbot Werdo's death on 30 March 812, Wolfleoz, against the will of the members of the Convention in Saint Gall, additionally resumed the office of Abbot of Saint Gall. He tried to further strengthen his powerful position by allocating monastery offices to laity who were loyal to him. For this reason, the monks of Saint Gall decided to turn to Emperor Louis the Pious with a complaint that initiated the gradual detachment of the Abbey of Saint Gall from the Bishopric of Konstanz. Wolfleoz tried by means of a forged document to enforce his rights, but he failed. In 816, the convent freely elected Gozbert Abbot of Saint Gall. In 818, Louis the Pious granted the Abbey of Saint Gall immunity and therewith the status of an imperial abbey as well as the independence from Konstanz.
