= Heinrich von Gundelfingen =

Abbot of Saint Gall from 1411 to 1418

Heinrich von Gundelfingen (born before 1383; died March 1429) was abbot of the Abbey of Saint Gall from 1411 to 1418 when he resigned. He was the grandfather of Heinrich von Gundelfingen.

== Life ==
Heinrich descended from the same family as the former Abbot of Saint Gall, Konrad von Gundelfingen (1288–1291). The first mention of Heinrich as monk in Saint Gall appears in connection with the election of his predecessor. Before his election as abbot, Heinrich is documented three more times: in 1383, 1395 and in 1410 as master of the monastery. From 1392 he was documented as working dean and from 1401 as gatekeeper. He was probably neither educated nor priestly ordinated; as an abbot he was considered illiterate and incapable. Being one of two conventuals, who, after Abbot Kuno von Stoffeln's death, remained at the monastery, he became abbot upon the urging of the city of Saint Gall. The abbey was at that time merely retained for trade and economic reasons. The other conventual, Georg von Enne, received the remaining monastic offices.

== Works ==
In 1411, Heinrich received homage in Saint Gall. On 6 January 1412, the city appealed to Pope John XXIII for the confirmation of the new abbot and described in the same letter the abysmal state of the abbey. Thereupon, on 28 March 1412, the Pope commanded the Bishop of Augsburg, the Judicial vicar of Basel and the Cantor of Saint Felix and Regula to protect the abbey in its rights and property. On 5 December 1411, he even took the abbey under his own protection and confirmed its rights.

Emperor Sigismund provided Heinrich with a confirmation of prerogatives and a jura regalia on 24 October 1413. In the same year, as it was custom, the abbot on his part confirmed the rights of the cities of Saint Gall, Wil and Wangen.

A dispute between the abbey and the Appenzeller, which had begun during the reign of Henrich's predecessor and had culminated in the Appenzell Wars, in which the abbey was defeated, was in 1412 brought before the federal Tagsatzung, but the negotiations remained fruitless.

In the year 1417, several visitations took place in the abbey. They all concluded that the monastery was in high need of reform. Subsequently, Abbot Heinrich was removed from office and Konrad von Pegau was on 9 May 1418 pronounced abbot in his stead. One last documentary mention of Heinrich as abbot appears on 13 June 1418.

Due to an agreement with Abbot Heinrich von Mansdorf, Heinrich von Gundelfingen received a life estate of 200 gulden on 21 August 1419. After Heinrich von Mansdorf's death, Heinrich, as the only conventual, became again caretaker and governor of the abbey.
