= Craloh =

Craloh (died 26 February 958) was abbot of the Benedictine Abbey of Saint Gall from 942 to 958. During his time in office, the first anti-abbot was elected.

== Life ==
Craloh was the biological brother of his predecessor, Thieto, and was elected on 31 May 942. He is listed in the book of vows but his offices are not known before that. Because he only appears in the monks' registers from 895, one can assume that he entered the monastery after that point in time. There is a record of his work as a scribe in the form of a document from the 27 October 920. His role as abbot is mentioned for the first time in a document from the 12 June 947, in which Otto I granted him the right of coinage in Rorschach.

== Works ==
Craloh's main task was a difficult one. He had to rebuild the abbey after being destroyed in a fire in 937. He was somewhat successful economically, as attested by eight sales or donation of goods to the Abbey of Saint Gall between 948 and 957. His strictness in wanting to reinstate former discipline in the monastery led to friction within the abbey. Part of his reforms was the renewal of a purgatorial society with Reichenau Abbey in 945.

In 953/54 those tensions reached their breaking point when Liudolf began his rebellion against Otto I. The majority of monks took Liudolf's side, while Craloh took the side of Otto I. During the revolt, Craloh fled to Otto's court and only returned to the convent after the defeat of the rebellion. In the meantime, the abbey was ruled by Anno, who was elected anti-abbot by the Saint Gall monks. He died before the defeat of Liudolf, so when Cradolf returned he found the abbey under the rule of the monk Viktor. Bishop Ulrich of Augsburg reconciled the convent with the abbot, who ultimately destroyed the monks' trust by sending armed men after Viktor to blind him as he was fleeing to his relatives. As a consequence, Craloh retreated to an estate in Herisau. During the time in which he resided in Herisau, he let Dean Ekkehard I run the abbey on his behalf, wishing him to become next abbot after he died. However, due to a horseriding accident, Ekkehard was unable to assume that role.
