= Thietpald =

Abbot of St. Gall

Thietpald (died 4 or 7 January 1034) was abbot of the Abbey of Saint Gall from 1022 to 1034.

== Life ==
Thietpald became Abbot of Saint Gall in September 1022. On 19 April 1025, King Conrad II confirmed the immunity and the free election of abbot for Thietpald. This constitutes his sole documented mention. Before that, he only appears in the fraternity book of Reichenau (Reichenauer Verbrüderungsbuch).

== Works ==
Thietpald was highly esteemed as abbot. His rule is regarded as a period of peace, even though the rebellious Ernest II, Duke of Swabia, heavily ravaged the abbey in 1026. The following year, however, Empress Gisela of Swabia visited the monastery with her son Henry.
