= Notker Physicus =

Monk, physician, painter, composer and poet (died 975)

Notker Physicus (c. 900 – 12 November 975) was a Benedictine monk at the Abbey of Saint Gall, active as a physician, painter, composer and poet. He is best known for his medical prowess, and may have been physician to the Holy Roman Emperors Otto I and Otto II. His paintings, now lost, were well regarded in his time, and two of his compositions survive, an office and hymn.

Aside from physicus (lit. 'physician'), or the equivalent medicus, he was also nicknamed piperis granum (lit. 'pepper grain') on account of his monastic dedication. He is sometimes called Notker II, living after St. Gall's Notker the Stammerer and before Notker Labeo.

== Life and career ==
Let the throng with humble voice
Sing a hymn to the Blessed Virgin,
Praising God in all things,
Singing of His miracles.

Original Latin:
Hymnum beatae virgini
Die turma voce supplici,
Laude Deum per omnia,
Ejus canens miracula.

— Excerpt from "Hymnum beatae virgini" by Notker Physicus

Notker's birth year is unknown; the philologist Udo Kühne estimated it around 900, which is also given by the Great Norwegian Encyclopedia.

His life was spent at the Abbey of Saint Gall, although only two specific dates can be connected with Notker, aside from his death. By 956 or 957, he had obtained the cellarius (lit. 'cellarer') position as an administrator, and by 965 the hospitarius (lit. 'hospitaller') position as a physician. Notker is probably identifiable with a Notker notarius, indicating that he was a notary. His medical expertise probably led him to be physician of the Holy Roman Emperors Otto I and Otto II at some point. Among his students was Balther von Säckingen, who dedicated his Vita sancti Fridolin to Notker. He died on 12 November 975.

Notker Physicus was given the nickname piperis granum (lit. 'pepper grain') on account of his monastic dedication. Later sources also call him physicus (lit. 'physician'), or the equivalent medicus, signifying his medical prowess. He is sometimes referred to as "Notker II", as the second in a line of Notkers at St. Gall, proceeded by Notker the Stammerer and followed by Notker Labeo. Notker Physicus and Notker Labeo were likely named after Notker the Stammerer. Another Notker, who died on 15 December 975, was abbot of Saint Gall from 971 to 975 and nephew of Notker Physicus.

He made several paintings, which were lauded by Ekkehard IV, particularly during a restoration effort for the Abbey's fire in 937. The Great Norwegian Encyclopedia remarks that Notker's painterly abilities "achieved great recognition" in both church artworks and that of illuminated manuscripts. Ekkehard also indicates that Notker authored now lost-poems for royal receptions and at least two extant musical compositions: an office for Saint Othmar, the "Rector aeterni metuende saecli", and a hymn, the "Hymnum beatae virgini".

== Works ==
- "Rector aeterni metuende saecli" ("Fearsome Ruler of the Eternal World"), a musical office for Saint Othmar
- "Hymnum beatae virgini" ("Hymn to the Blessed Virgin"), a hymn
- Lost poems (for royal receptions) and lost paintings
