= Hartmut of Saint Gall =

Hartmut von St. Gallen (died 23 January after 905 in Saint Gall) was abbot of the Abbey of Saint Gall.

Hartmut (Old High German "of powerful courage and spirit"), was monk, pupil of Rabanus Maurus at the Princely Abbey of Fulda, and became Grimald's successor as Abbot of Saint Gall in 872. Otfrid of Weissenburg dedicated his Old High German "Liber evangeliorum", a kind of diatessaron in southern Rhenisch Franconian dialect, i. a. to his friend and fellow student Hartmut. As abbot, Hartmut, like his predecessor, generated an abundant construction activity. In 883, he abdicated and afterwards led a life of seclusion as recluse near the monastery in Saint Gall. He died on a 23 January after 905.

== Sources ==
- Gössi, Anton: St. Gallen - Äbte: Hartmut, 872-883. in: Helvetia Sacra. III: Die Orden mit Benediktinerregel. 2/1: Frühe Klöster, die Benediktiner und Benediktinerinnen in der Schweiz. Francke Verlag, Bern 1986, p. 1277–79.
- Duft, Johannes: Hartmut. in: Neue Deutsche Biographie (NDB), Vol 8. Duncker & Humblot, Berlin 1969, p. 7.
- Meyer von Knonau, Gerold: Hartmut. in: Allgemeine Deutsche Biographie (ADB), Vol 10. Duncker & Humblot, Leipzig 1879, p. 704–6.
- Sauser, Ekkart: Hartmut. in: Biographisch-Bibliographisches Kirchenlexikon (BBKL), Vol 22. Bautz, Nordhausen 2003, p. 506.

Preceded by Grimald	Abt von St. Gallen; 872–883	Succeeded by Bernhard
