= Ulrich I of Saint Gall =

Ulrich (died 27 January 990) was abbot of the Abbey of Saint Gall from 984 to 990.

== Life ==
Not much is known about Ulrich. In 956/57, he possibly held the office of Hospitarius. He became abbot of Saint Gall in November 984. He is not mentioned in any records.

== Works ==
Ulrich is supposed to have completed the construction and interior works commenced by his predecessor Ymmo.
