= Kerhart =

Kerhart (or Gerhart; died 22 May 1001) was abbot of the Abbey of Saint Gall from 990 to 1001.

== Life ==
Before he was elected abbot, Kerhart is reported to have been the companion of his brother Kunibert, the former abbot of Niederaltaich Abbey, when he died on one of his travels. Kerhart's reign began after 27 January 990. It is possible that he signed a hymn, furnished with neumes, by Pope Gregory I. Kerhart might have been his scribe or composer.

== Works ==
In Saint Gall's historiography, Kerhart comes out badly: His squandering of abbey property and the ruining of its breed is said to have caused a divide in the convent. One party, consisting of older conventuals who closely followed the rules, subsequently complained about Kerhart to Emperor Otto. A certain Duke Muozo had to come to his rescue and prevent the trial. Afterwards, Kerhart apparently ruled even worse than before.
