= Abbey of Saint Gall =

Cathedral of St Gall
- The Cathedral of Saint Gall
- Kathedrale St. Gallen
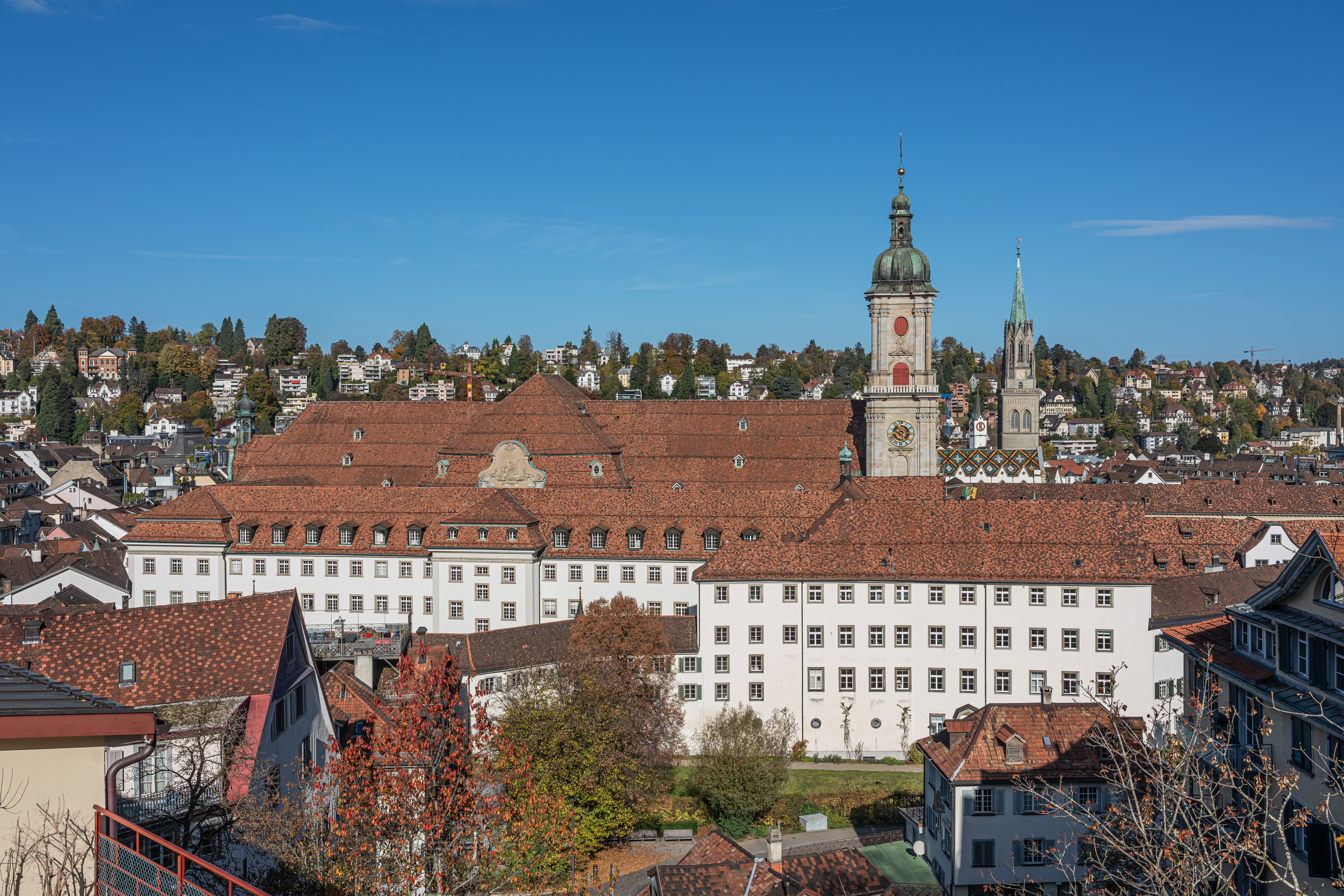
- View of the former abbey
- Cathedral of St Gall
- 47°25′23″N 9°22′38″E
- Location: St. Gallen
- Country: Switzerland
- Denomination: Catholic
- Website: Website of the Cathedral

History
- Status: Active
- Founded: 8th century

Architecture
- Functional status: Cathedral
- Heritage designation: UNESCO World Heritage Site
- Style: Baroque

Administration
- Diocese: Roman Catholic Diocese of Saint Gallen

Clergy
- Bishop: Markus Büchel

UNESCO World Heritage Site
- Criteria: Cultural: ii, iv
- Reference: 268
- Inscription: 1983 (7th Session)

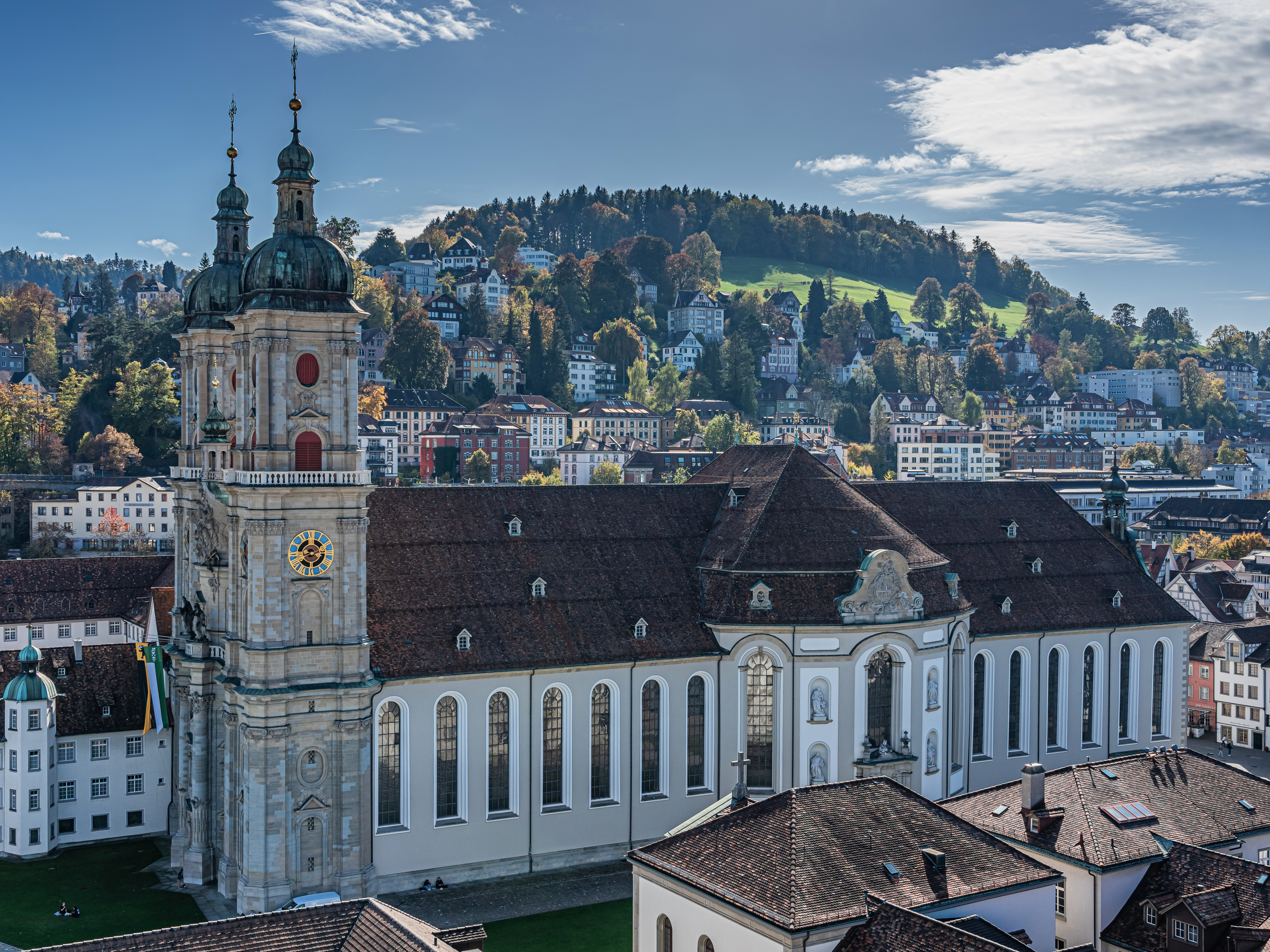
Abbey Cathedral of St. Gall

The Abbey of Saint Gall (German: Abtei St. Gallen) is a dissolved abbey (747–1805) in a Catholic religious complex in the city of St. Gallen in Switzerland. The Carolingian-era monastery existed from 719, founded by Saint Othmar on the spot where Saint Gall had erected his hermitage. It became an independent principality between 9th and 13th centuries, and was for many centuries one of the chief Benedictine abbeys in Europe. The library of the Abbey is one of the oldest monastic libraries in the world.

The city of St. Gallen originated as an adjoining settlement of the abbey. The abbey was secularized around 1800, and in 1848 its former church became St. Gallen Cathedral, the seat of the Diocese of Saint Gallen. Since 1983 the abbey precinct has been a UNESCO World Heritage Site.

== History ==
=== Foundation ===
Around 612 Gallus, according to tradition, an Irish monk and disciple and companion of Saint Columbanus, established a hermitage on the site that would become the monastery. He lived in his cell until his death in 646, and was buried there in Arbon (Canton of Thurgau). Afterwards, the people venerated him as a saint and prayed at his tomb for his intercession in times of danger.

Following Gallus' death, his disciples remained living together in his cell and followed the rule of St. Columban, which combined prayer, work of the hands, reading, and teaching. They aided and taught virtue to the many pilgrims who came to St. Gall's tomb. St. Magnus was the first successor of St. Gallen, but he soon left on a mission to Allgäu, Swabia. His successors were the deacon Stephen and the priest Magulfe, under whom the news of St. Gallen's miracles spread throughout most of Germany.

Several different dates are given for the foundation of the monastery, including 719, 720, 747 and the middle of the 8th century. A gentleman and judge of Thurgau, Waltraf (possibly, Waltram or Gaudran), in order to use the alms and collections that were being given at St. Gall's tomb to found a more regular monastery, attracted a local Alemannic pastor Otmar. Waltraf went to see Charles Martel, gave him the property of the hermitage, and asked him to give the administration of it to Otmar. Charles agreed and sent Otmar the finances to build a monastery. After the death of Charles Martel, his son Pepin continued to support them. On the recommendation of his brother Carloman, who had visited this monastery on his way to Italy, Pepin gave the monastery privileges, letters of protection, and an assured income. Pepin placed the rule of St. Benedict in the hands of St. Otmar (to be substituted for that of St. Columban).

Otmar (or Othmar) is named as the founder and the first abbot of the Abbey of St. Gall. During his abbacy the St. Gall School was founded. Otmar extended St. Gall's original hermit cell and adopted the Carolingian style for his building projects. The abbey grew quickly; many Alemannic noblemen entered to become monks and arts, letters and sciences flourished. The register of monastic professions, at the end of abbot Otmar's rule makes mentions of 53 names. Two monks of the Abbey of St Gall, Magnus of Füssen and Theodor, founded the monasteries in Kempten and Füssen in the Allgäu. With the growth in the number of monks the abbey also grew economically stronger. Much land in Thurgau, Zürichgau and in the rest of Alemannia as far as the Neckar was donated to the abbey by means of Stiftungen. Under abbot Waldo of Reichenau (740–814) copying of manuscripts was undertaken and a famous library was gathered. Numerous Anglo-Saxon and Irish monks came to copy manuscripts. At Charlemagne's request Pope Adrian I sent distinguished cantors from Rome, who instructed the monks in the use of the Gregorian chant. In 744, the Alemannic nobleman Beata sold several properties to the abbey in order to finance his journey to Rome.

=== Golden Age ===
In the subsequent century, St. Gall came into conflict with the nearby Bishopric of Constance which had recently acquired jurisdiction over the Abbey of Reichenau on Lake Constance. It was not until Emperor Louis the Pious (ruled 814–840) confirmed in 813 the imperial immediacy (Reichsunmittelbarkeit) of the abbey, that this conflict ceased. The abbey became an Imperial Abbey (Reichsabtei). King Louis the German confirmed in 833 the immunity of the abbey and allowed the monks the free choice of their abbot. In 854 finally, the Abbey of St Gall reached its full autonomy by King Louis the German releasing the abbey from the obligation to pay tithes to the Bishop of Constance.

From this time until the 10th century, the abbey flourished. It was home to several famous scholars, including Notker of Liège, Notker the Stammerer, Notker Labeo, Tuotilo and Hartker (who developed the antiphonal liturgical books for the abbey). During the 9th century a new, larger church was built and the library was expanded. Manuscripts on a wide variety of topics were purchased by the abbey and copies were made. Over 400 manuscripts from this time have survived and are still in the library today.

=== Silver Age ===
Between 924 and 933 the Magyars threatened the abbey and the books had to be removed to Reichenau for safety. Not all the books were returned.

On 26 April 937 a fire broke out and destroyed much of the abbey and the adjoining settlement, though the library was undamaged. About 954 they started to protect the monastery and buildings by a surrounding wall. Around 971/974 abbot Notker (about whom almost nothing is known; nephew of Notker Physicus) finalized the walling and the adjoining settlements started to become the town of St Gall. In 1006, the abbey was the northernmost place where a sighting of the 1006 supernova was recorded.

The death of abbot Ulrich II on 9 December 1076 terminated the cultural silver age of the monastery.

=== Under the Prince-Abbots ===
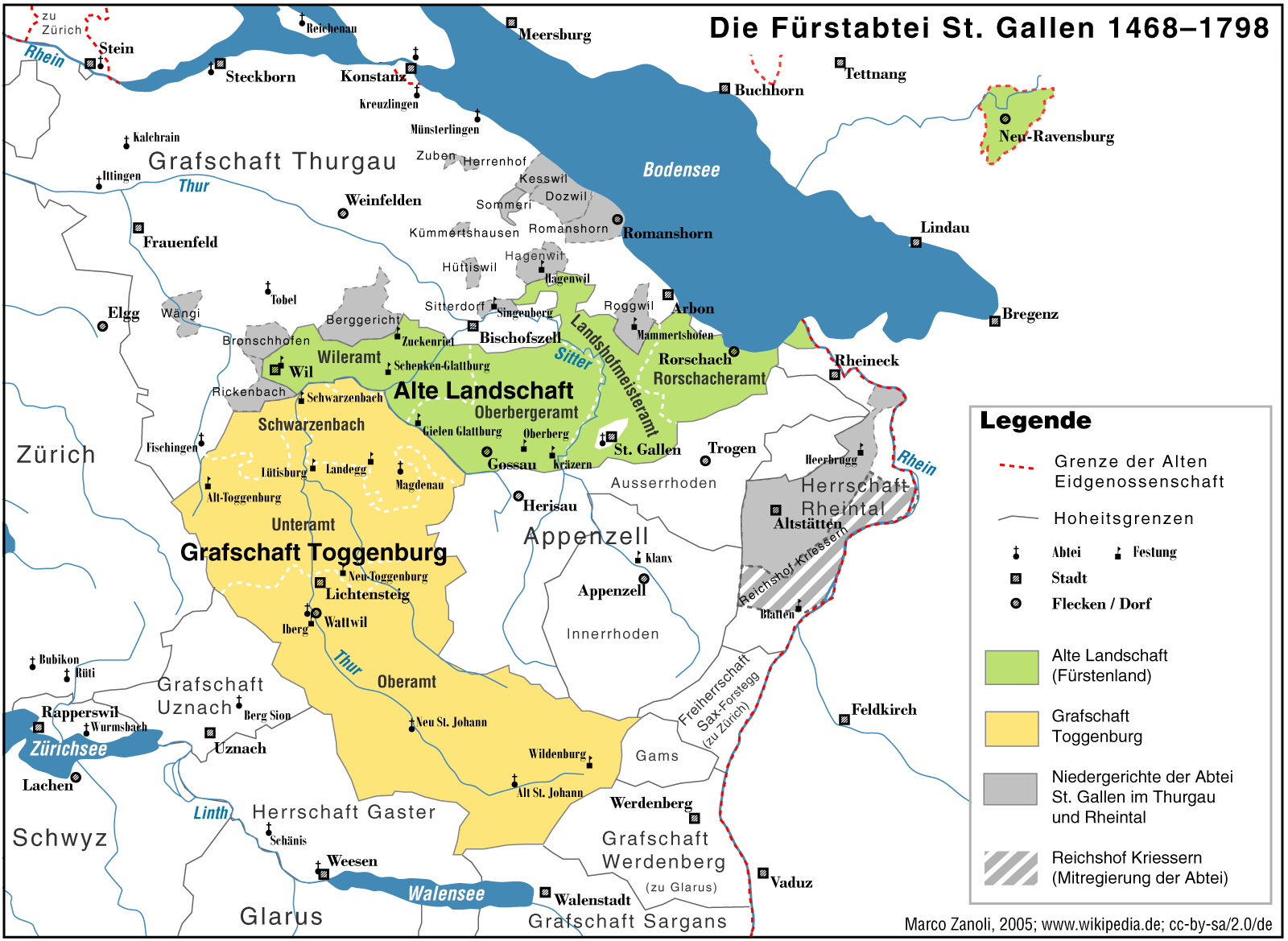
The territories of the Abbey of St. Gall from the mid-15th century to 1798

In 1207, abbot Ulrich von Sax was raised to the rank of Prince (Reichsfürst, or simply Fürst) of the Holy Roman Empire by King Philip of Germany. The abbey became a Princely Abbey (Reichsabtei). As the abbey became more involved in local politics, it entered a period of decline. The city of St. Gallen proper progressively freed itself from the rule of the abbot, acquiring Imperial immediacy, and by the late 15th century was recognized as a Free imperial city. By about 1353 the guilds, headed by the cloth-weavers guild, gained control of the civic government. In 1415 the city bought its liberty from the German king Sigismund. During the 14th century Humanists were allowed to carry off some of the rare texts from the abbey library.

In the late 14th and early 15th centuries, the farmers of the abbot's personal estates (known as Appenzell, from Latin: abbatis cella meaning "cell (i.e. estate) of the abbot") began seeking independence. In 1401, the first of the Appenzell Wars broke out, and following the Appenzell victory at Stoss in 1405 they became allies of the Swiss Confederation in 1411. During the Appenzell Wars, the town of St. Gallen often sided with Appenzell against the abbey. So when Appenzell allied with the Swiss, the town of St. Gallen followed just a few months later. The abbot became an ally of several members of the Swiss Confederation (Zürich, Lucerne, Schwyz and Glarus) in 1451, while Appenzell and St. Gallen became full members of the Swiss Confederation in 1454. Then, in 1457, the town of St. Gallen became officially free from the abbot.

In 1468 the abbot, Ulrich Rösch, bought the County of Toggenburg from the representatives of its counts, after the family died out in 1436. In 1487 he built a monastery at Rorschach on Lake Constance, to which he planned to move. However, he encountered stiff resistance from the St. Gallen citizenry, other clerics, and the Appenzell nobility in the Rhine Valley who were concerned about their holdings. The town of St. Gallen wanted to restrict the increase of power in the abbey and simultaneously increase the power of the town. The mayor of St. Gallen, Ulrich Varnbüler, established contact with farmers and Appenzell residents (led by the fanatical Hermann Schwendiner) who were seeking an opportunity to weaken the abbot. Initially, he protested to the abbot and the representatives of the four sponsoring Confederate cantons (Zürich, Lucerne, Schwyz, and Glarus) against the construction of the new abbey in Rorschach. Then on July 28, 1489, he had armed troops from St. Gallen and Appenzell destroy the buildings already under construction. When the abbot complained to the Confederates about the damages and demanded full compensation, Varnbüler responded with a counter suit and in cooperation with Schwendiner rejected the arbitration efforts of the non-partisan Confederates. He motivated the clerics from Wil to Rorschach to discard their loyalty to the abbey and spoke against the abbey at the town meeting at Waldkirch, where the popular league was formed. He was confident that the four sponsoring cantons would not intervene with force, due to the prevailing tensions between the Confederation and the Swabian League. He was strengthened in his resolve by the fact that the people of St. Gallen elected him again to the highest magistrate in 1490.

==== An associate of the Swiss Confederation ====
However, in early 1490 the four cantons decided to carry out their duty to the abbey and to invade the St. Gallen canton with an armed force. The people of Appenzell and the local clerics submitted to this force without noteworthy resistance, while the city of St. Gallen braced for a fight to the finish. However, when they learned that their compatriots had given up the fight, they lost confidence; the result was that they concluded a peace pact that greatly restricted the city's powers and burdened the city with serious penalties and reparations payments. Varnbüler and Schwendiner fled to the court of King Maximilian and lost all their property in St. Gallen and Appenzell. However, the abbot's reliance on the Swiss to support him reduced his position almost to that of a "subject district".

The town adopted the Reformation in 1524, while the abbey remained Catholic, which damaged relations between the town and abbey. Both the abbot and a representative of the town were admitted to the Swiss Tagsatzung or Diet as the closest associates of the Confederation.

In the 16th century the abbey was raided by Calvinist groups, which scattered many of the old books. In 1530, abbot Diethelm began a restoration that stopped the decline and led to an expansion of the schools and library.

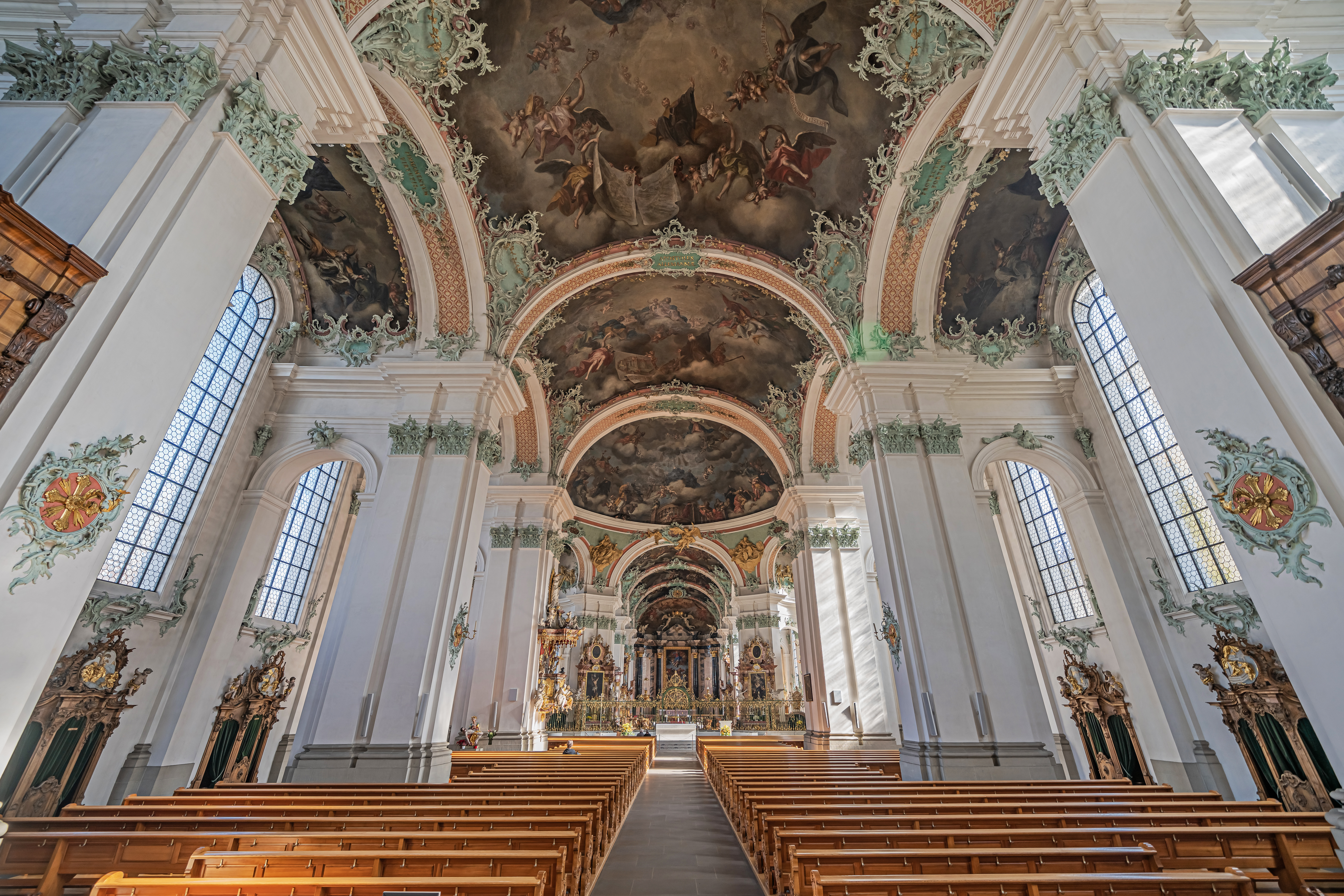
The interior of the cathedral is one of the most important baroque monuments in Switzerland

Under abbot Pius Reher (1630–54) a printing press was started. In 1712 during the Toggenburg war, also called the second war of Villmergen, the Abbey of St. Gall was pillaged by the Swiss. They took most of the books and manuscripts to Zürich and Bern. For security, the abbey was forced to request the protection of the townspeople of St. Gallen. Until 1457 the townspeople had been serfs of the abbey, but they had grown in power until they were protecting the abbey.

==== End of the Prince-Abbots ====
Following the disturbances, the abbey was still the largest religious city-state in Switzerland, with over 77,000 inhabitants. A final attempt to expand the abbey resulted in the demolition of most of the medieval monastery. The new structures, including the cathedral by architect Peter Thumb (1681–1766), were designed in the late Baroque style and constructed between 1755 and 1768. The large and ornate new abbey did not remain a monastery for very long. In 1798 the Prince-Abbot's secular power (the last to hold the title was Pankraz Vorster) was suppressed, and the abbey was secularized. The monks were driven out and moved into other abbeys. The abbey became a separate See in 1846, with the abbey church as its cathedral and a portion of the monastic buildings for the bishop.

== Cultural treasures ==
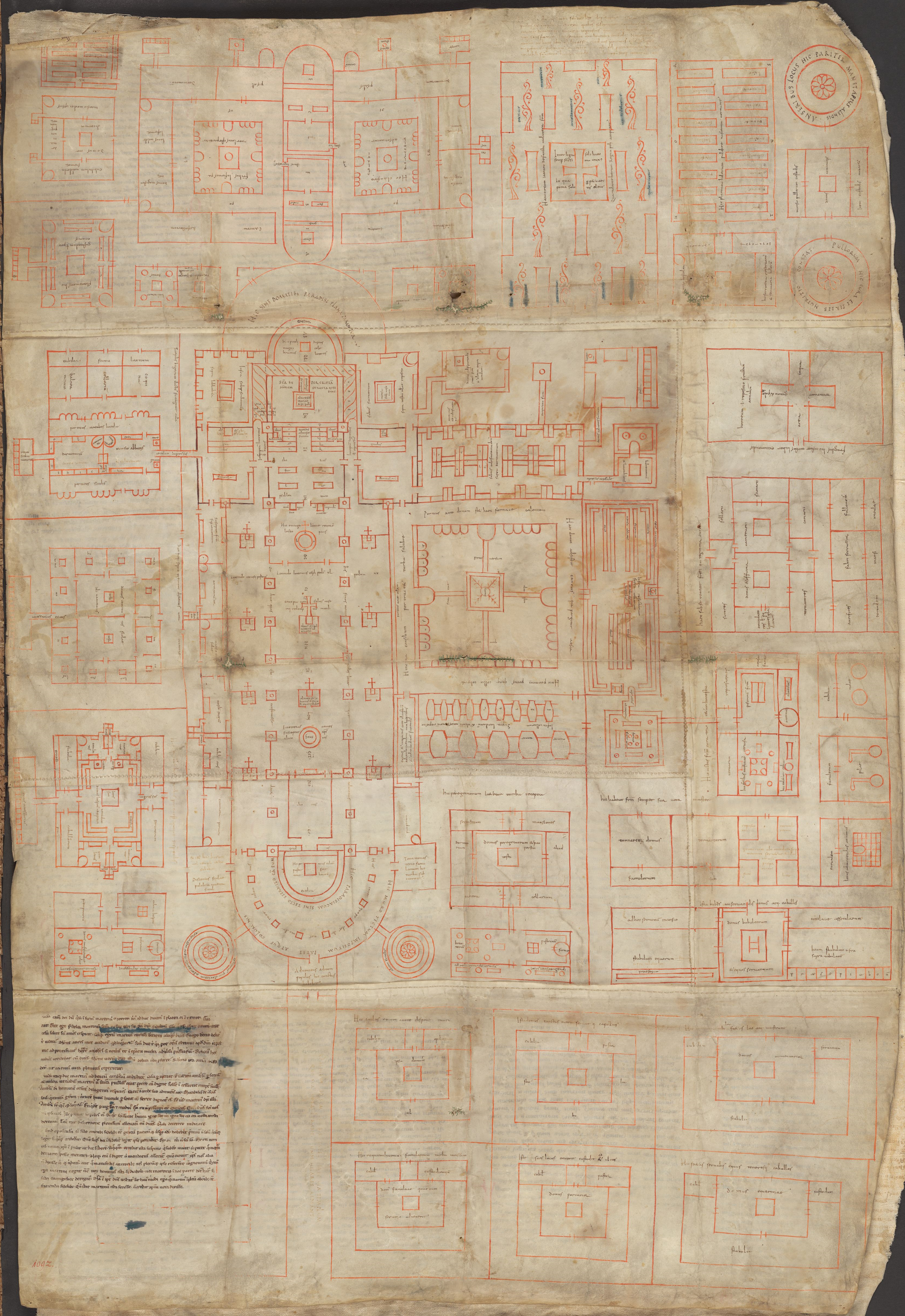
The Plan of St Gall (c. 820–830), the only surviving major architectural drawing from the Early Middle Ages

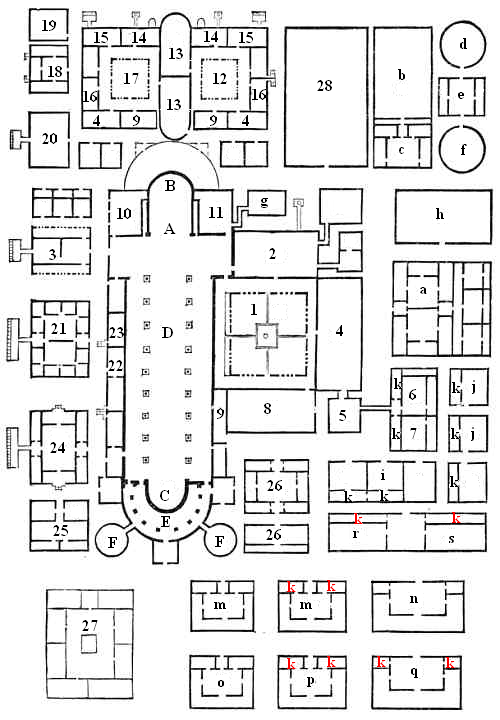
The diagram version of the Plan

The Abbey library of Saint Gall is recognized as one of the richest medieval libraries in the world. It is home to one of the most comprehensive collections of early medieval books in the German-speaking part of Europe. As of 2005, the library consists of over 160,000 books, of which 2100 are handwritten. Nearly half of the handwritten books are from the Middle Ages and 400 are over 1000 years old. Lately the Stiftsbibliothek has launched a project for the digitisation of the priceless manuscript collection, which currently (December 2009) contains 355 documents that are available on the Codices Electronici Sangallenses webpage.

The library interior is exquisitely realised in the Rococo style with carved polished wood, stucco and paint used to achieve its overall effect. It was designed by the architect Peter Thumb and is open to the public. In addition it holds exhibitions as well as concerts and other events.

One of the more interesting documents in the Stiftsbibliothek is a copy of Priscian's Institutiones grammaticae which contains the poem Is acher in gaíth in-nocht... written in Old Irish.

The library also preserves a unique 9th-century document, known as the Plan of St. Gall, the only surviving major architectural drawing from the roughly 700-year period between the fall of the Western Roman Empire and the 13th century. The Plan drawn sometime between AD 820–830 AD was never actually built, and was so named because it was dedicated to the then-abbot of Saint Gall and kept at the famous medieval monastery library, where it remains to this day. The plan was an ideal of what a well-designed and well-supplied monastery should have, as envisioned by one of the synods held at Aachen for the reform of monasticism in the Frankish empire during the early years of emperor Louis the Pious (between 814 and 817).

A late 9th-century drawing of Paul lecturing an agitated crowd of Jews and gentiles, part of a copy of a Pauline epistles produced at and still held by the monastery, was included in a medieval-drawing show at the Metropolitan Museum of Art in New York the summer of 2009. A reviewer noted that the artist had "a special talent for depicting hair, ... with the saint's beard ending in curling droplets of ink."

St. Gall is noted for its early use of the neume, the basic element of Western and Eastern systems of musical notation prior to the invention of five-line staff notation. The earliest extant manuscripts are from the 9th or 10th century.

In 1983, the Convent of St. Gall was inscribed on the UNESCO World Heritage List as "a perfect example of a great Carolingian monastery".

== People of the abbey ==
=== List of abbots ===
There were a total of 73 ruling abbots (including six anti-abbots) between 719 and 1805. A complete collection of abbots' biographies was published by Henggeler (1929). A table of abbots' names complete with their coats of arms was printed by Beat Jakob Anton Hiltensperger in 1778.

- Saint Othmar (719–759)
- John II (bishop of Constance) (759/60–782)
- Ratpert (782)
- Waldo (782–784)
- Werdo (784–812)
- Wolfleoz (812–816)
- Gozbert (816–837) Expanded the buildings, started collecting books for the library.
- Bernwig (837–840/41)
- Engilbert I (840/841)
- Grimald (841–872)
- Hartmut (872–883)
- Bernhard (883–890)
- Solomon (890–919), Abbot of 11 other monasteries and Bishop of Constance.
- Hartmann (922–925)
- Engilbert II (925–933)
- Thieto (933–942)
- Craloh (942–958)
  - Anno (953–954), anti-abbot
- Purchart I (958–971)
- Notker (971–975), nephew of Notker Physicus
- Ymmo (976–984)
- Ulrich I (984–990)
- Kerhart (990–1001)
- Purchart II (1001–1022)
- Thietpald (1022–1034)
- Nortpert (1034–1072)
- Ulrich II (1072–1076)
- Ulrich of Eppenstein (1077–1121)
  - Lutold (1077–c. 1083), anti-abbot
  - Werinhar (1083–1086), anti-abbot
- Manegold von Mammern (1121–1133)
  - Heinrich von Twiel (1121–1122), anti-abbot
- Werinher (1133–1167)
- Ulrich von Tegerfelden (1167–1199)
- Ulrich von Veringen (1199–1200)
- Heinrich von Klingen (1200–1204)
- Ulrich von Sax (1204–1220) Lord of Hohensax and first Prince-Abbot
- Rudolf von Güttingen (1220–1226)
- Konrad von Bussnang (1226–1239)
- Walter von Trauchburg (1239–1244)
- Berchtold von Falkenstein (1244–1272)
- Ulrich von Güttingen (1272–1277)
  - Heinrich von Wartenberg (1272–1274), anti-abbot
- Rumo von Ramstein (1277–1281)
- Wilhelm von Montfort (1281–1301)
  - Konrad von Gundelfingen (1288–1291), anti-abbot sponsored by Rudolf I of Germany
- Heinrich von Ramstein (1301–1318)
- Hiltbold von Werstein (1318–1329)
- Rudolf von Montfort (1330–1333)
- Hermann von Bonstetten (1333–1360)
- Georg von Wildenstein (1360–1379)
- Kuno von Stoffeln (1379–1411)
- Heinrich von Gundelfingen (1411–1418)
- Konrad von Pegau (1418–1419)
- Heinrich von Mansdorf (1419–1426)
- Eglolf Blarer (1426–1442)
- Kaspar von Breitenlandenberg (1442–1463)
- Ulrich Rösch (1463–1491) Bought the county of Toggenburg. In 1487 he built a monastery at Rorschach.
- Gotthard Giel von Glattburg (1491–1504)
- Franz von Gaisberg (1504–1529) Abbot when the Reformation took place.
- Kilian Germann (1529–1530) Elected to prevent the Reformation from entering the Abbey.
- Diethelm Blarer von Wartensee (1530–1564) Expanded the Abbey, known as the Third Founder due to his work on the Abbey.
- Otmar Kunz (1564–1577)
- Joachim Opser (1577–1594)
- Bernhard Müller (1594–1630)
- Pius Reher (1630–1654)
- Gallus Alt (1654–1687)
- Celestino Sfondrati (1687–1696)
- Leodegar Bürgisser (1696–1717)
- Joseph von Rudolphi (1717–1740)
- Cölestin Gugger von Staudach (1740–1767)
- Beda Angehrn (1767–1796)
- Pankraz Vorster (1796–1805)

=== Nuns ===
- Wiborada (died 926). Though many women before her were venerated as saints, she is the first woman canonized by the Holy See of the Catholic Church in 1047. The first formal Canonization by the Holy See for a saint from outside of Rome being Saint Udalric, Bishop of Augsburg in 993 just 54 years earlier.

== See also ==
- List of Carolingian monasteries
- Carolingian architecture
- Carolingian art
- Carolingian dynasty
- Carolingian Empire
- Carolingian Renaissance
- Saint-Gall Cantatorium
- Waltharius
- Ekkehard I

== Notes and references ==
- Walter William Horn's Papers Regarding The Plan of St. Gall : production materials, 1967–1979 are housed in the Department of Special Collections and University Archives at Stanford University Libraries
