= Nortpert =

Nortpert (died after 1076) was abbot of the Abbey of Saint Gall from 1034 to 1072.

== Works ==
Nortpert was called to Saint Gall from the reform monastery Stavelot in order to reintroduce a strict monastic way of life. Despite resistance on the part of the monks of Saint Gall, he was able to successfully assert a reform programme. In 1040, he welcomed King Henry III whom he accompanied on his campaign in Italy in 1046. In Rome in 1047, he obtained the canonisation of Saint Gall's local saint Wiborada who died as a martyr in the course of the Hungarian invasions. As an abbot who tried to preserve the property rights of his monastery, he came into a bloody conflict with Bishop Rumold von Konstanz. After 38 years in office, he abdicated in 1072.

== Sources ==
- Nortpert on the website of the Stiftsarchiv St. Gallen.
- Nortpert in the Stadtlexikon Wil. Quoted after Duft, Johannes: Die Abtei St. Gallen.
