= Gotthard Giel von Glattburg =

Gotthard Giel von Glattburg (before 1489 – 13 April 1504) was abbot of the Abbey of Saint Gall from 1491 to 1504.

== Life ==
Gotthard descended from the ancient Saint Gall ministerial family Giel.

His father was Rudolf Giel von Glattburg. His sister Amalia was Abbess of Magdenau from 1507 to 1532, his sister Johanna was a nun in the same monastery. Gotthard transferred monastic fiefs to his brothers Peter, Johann and Rudolf and provided his father with the dominion Wängi in the Canton of Thurgau.

== Works ==
The Abbey of Saint Gall bought the dominion Glattburg in 1486. Gotthard from the family von Glattburg is first attested as conventual in the Abbey of Saint Gall in 1489; in 1490 he held the office of governor in Wil. On 18 March 1491, he was elected abbot. Shortly thereafter, Gotthard travelled to Rome to receive the papal confirmation of his abbacy on 9 May 1491. He received the correspondent consecrations from Bishop Titus Veltri of Castro in the church Santa Maria dell’Anima on 15 May 1491. After his return to Saint Gall, he concluded a contract with Wil which regulated the rights of the prince abbot with regard to the city. Gotthard was generally very concerned about the consolidation of the prince abbot's rights and prerogatives. In 1492, he obtained the reintroduction of the tithe for the citizens of Gossau. Furthermore, Gotthard exerted himself for the reconstruction of the destroyed Abbey of Mariaberg in Rorschach which henceforth served for school and administration purposes. On 13 February 1497, he let the first grain and farmer's market be held in Rorschach. In the Swabian War, he supported the confederal towns with prince-abbot troop contingents. With regard to religion, he promoted, in accordance with his predecessor, the worship of Saint Gall's patron saint Gallus by commissioning a valuable reliquary for his bones.

Abbot Gotthard cultivated a clientelistic administration. He favoured his family as well as loyal followers and let them have a share in the abbey's economic resources. This led to the establishment of a vow that Gotthard's successor had to take (dt. "Wahlkapitulation") which was supposed to prevent such practices.
