= Otmar Kunz =

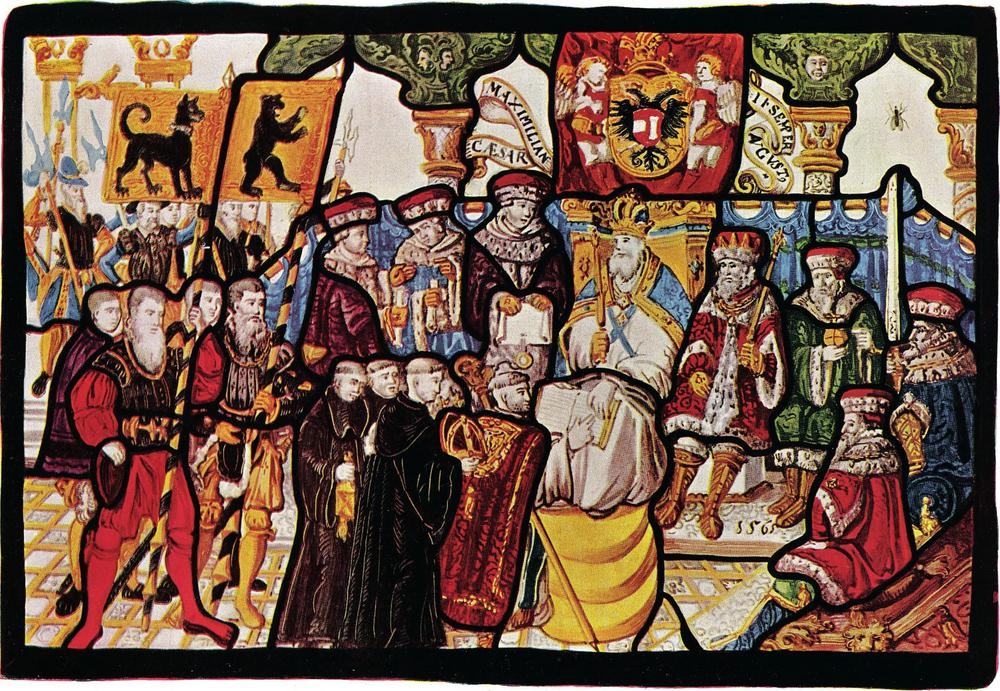
Emperor Maximilian II bestows the imperial regalia on Otmar Kunz

Otmar Kunz (born c. 1530 in Wil; died 27 January 1577 in Wil) was abbot of the Abbey of Saint Gall from 1564 until 1577.

== Life ==
Otmar, the son of a baker, took his vows on 18 May 1547 and was elected abbot of Saint Gall on 20 December 1564. The papal confirmation of the election occurred upon request of Melchior Lussy on 13 July 1565. He was consecrated by Auxiliary bishop Jakob Eliner of Konstanz, assisted by the abbots of Einsiedeln and Ottobeuren.

== Works ==
During Otmar's abbacy, the Abbey of Saint Gall renewed their alliance with France. His tenure was mostly characterised by a more severe separation of the catholic abbey and the protestant city. In the Rorschach treaty of the 13 September 1566 and the ruling of Wil on 20 September 1566 it was determined that a 31 ft high wall be built between abbey and city. Cunstruction was largely completed by October 1567. The southern gate, the so-called Karlstor, was completed in 1570 and enabled access to the abbey without ever entering city territory.

Abbot Otmar appears repeatedly as a builder. In 1568, he had the abbey of St. Johann rebuilt after it had been destroyed by arson. Furthermore, he was also keen on the construction of infirmaries in Bruggen and Rorschach. A further focus of his abbacy was placed on the Counter-Reformation. Following the Konstanz synodus diocesana of 1567, Otmar established the Reformatio Sancti Galli. In his decrees he admonished his subjects to go to confession and communion. While his reforms in the Fürstenland were largely successful, his attempts at recatholicising the Toggenburg were less so. He had a number of his conventuals be educated in Paris by the Jesuits. Otmar enriched the abbey library with several hundred books he bought in Paris, as well as newly produced liturgical manuscripts.
