= Walter von Trauchburg =

Walter von Trauchburg was abbot of the abbey of Saint Gall from 1239 until 1244. He is descended from an Allgäu noble family. His mother was a born as a von Güttingen.

== Activities ==
Walter of Trauchburg was decanus operis when he won the abbot's election against his rival Heinrich von Eichheim in 1239. However, the election sparked controversy which was spread even to Rome. Pope Gregory IX eventually called upon the bishop of Como to investigate the election. Thanks in large part to the support from Heinrich von Tanne of Constance, he was confirmed as abbot. In return, Walter of Trauchburg handed important papal and episcopal documents, which regulated the relationship between Saint Gall and Constance, over to the bishop of Constance.

Abbot Walter was a supporter of the house of Hohenstaufen. His brother Berthold was court judge for King Conrad IV. Walter offered military assistance to Conrad for his fight against the papacy and the archbishop of Mainz, for which an anathema was issued against him. The monastery's economy suffered under Abbot Walter's reign. He and the provost attempted to better the situation in 1244 by investing 50 marks from their yearly incomes in order to buy new goods or release pledged ones. In the autumn of the same year, the military conflicts between the city of Wil and the counts of Toggenburg broke out again. Abbot Walter of Trauchburg was overwhelmed with the situation and abdicated his position on 25 November 1244. He relocated to the Dominican monastery in Constance.
