= Ratpert (abbot of Saint Gall) =

Ratpert was the abbot of the Abbey of Saint Gall for about eight months in 782. He is mentioned in the oldest list of abbots between Abbots John and Waldo. Since John died on 9 February 782 and the earliest surviving act of Ratpert's successor, Waldo, dates to 8 November 782, the abbacy of Ratpert must have lasted from February to November at the latest. In the Casus sancti Galli of his namesake, the monk Ratpert, he is not mentioned save in a marginal note added later. In the 11th century, Hermann of Reichenau placed Ratpert's abbacy in 781. The Calvinist writer Melchior Goldast recorded his anniversary as commemorated on April 29.
