= Kilian Germann =

Prince abbot of St. Gall (1485–1530)

Kilian Germann (born at the end of 1485; died 30 August 1530 at the Bregenzer Ach) was prince abbot of the Abbey of Saint Gall from 1529 to 1530.

== Life ==
Germann was the son of Johannes Germann, chief bailiff of Lütisburg, and the brother of Hans Germann (called "der Batzenhammer") who was a mercenary leader and later became bailiff. His second brother Gallus Germann was also chief bailiff of Lütisburg. Kilian Germann was Grosskeller in Saint Gall in 1516, governor of Rorschach in 1523 and governor of Wil in 1528. In Rapperswill he was in 1529 elected Prince Abbot of the Abbey of Saint Gall in succession of Franz von Gaisberg. After Pope Clement VII' confirmation, he was also proposed to Emperor Charles V as prince abbot and was confirmed by him in February of the year 1530.

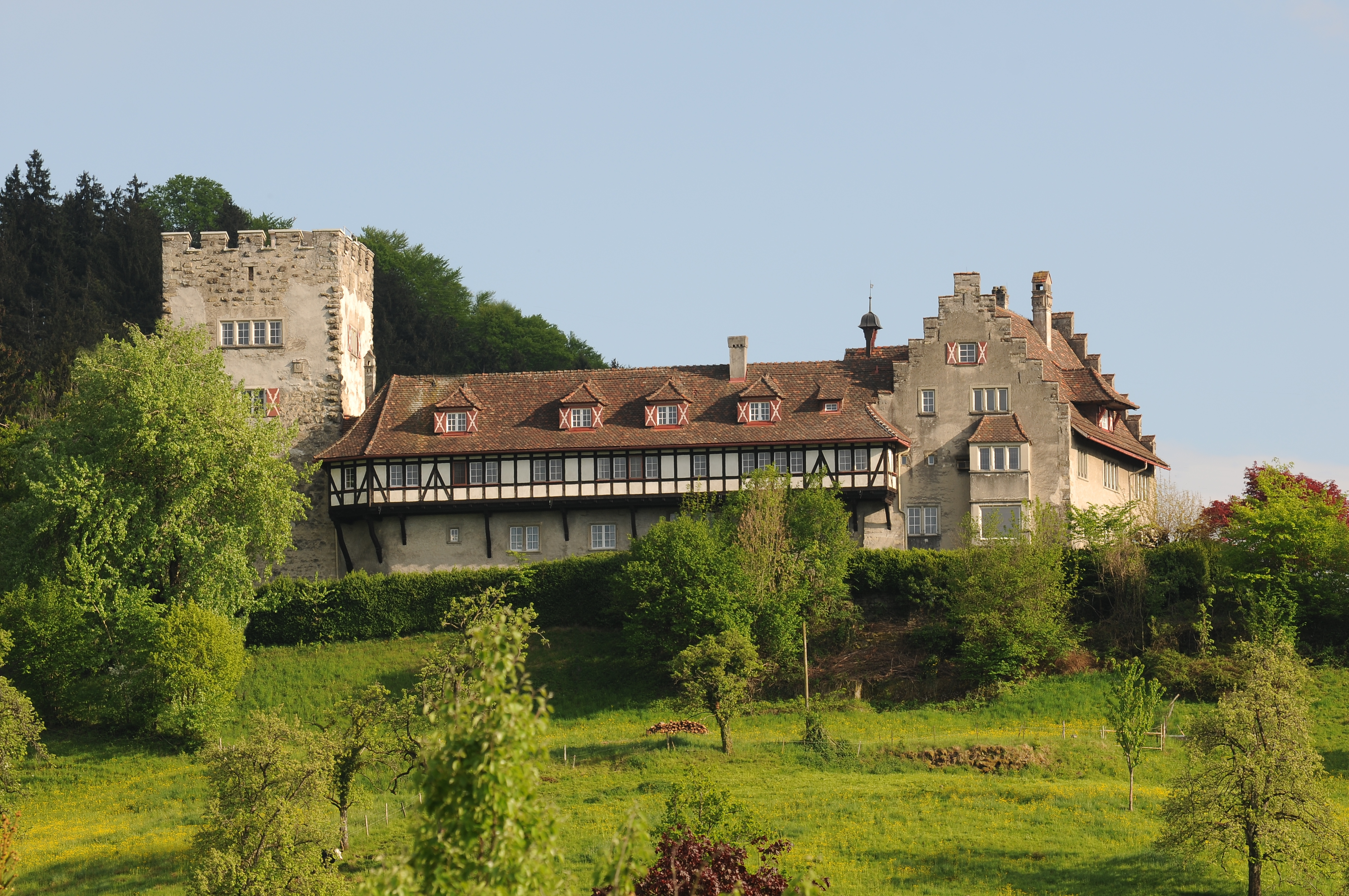
Wolfurt Castle, near Wolfurt

After the outbreak of the First War of Kappel, Prince Abbot Kilian fled to Meersburg in 1529. From February 1530 onwards, he lived at Wolfurt Castle near Bregenz. In exile at Lake Constance, he maintained relations with the Southern German nobility in order to exert political pressure on the reformation movement in the prince abbot's lands, which did not escape reformer Vadian. In 1530, he represented the prince abbey at the hearing (dt. “Tagsatzung”) in Baden. In July 1530, Prince abbot Kilian Germann visited the Diet of Augsburg. In the same year, after a visit from Count Montfort, he fell from his horse and drowned in the Bregenzer Ach. He was entombed at the Territorial Abbey of Wettingen-Mehrerau near Bregenz. His successor as Prince abbot of Saint Gall was Diethelm Blarer von Wartensee.

== Reading list ==
- Vogler, Werner. 2006: "Kilian Germann". Historisches Lexikon der Schweiz.
