= Heinrich von Ramstein =

Heinrich von Ramstein (born before 1230; died 22 July 1318) was abbot of the Benedictine Abbey of Saint Gall from 1301 until 1318.

== Life ==
It is not recorded whether Heinrich von Ramstein was related to his predecessor Rumo von Ramstein or the abbot of Reichenau Abbey, Albrecht von Ramstein. However, he may have been related to Abbot Berchtold von Falkenstein, who was abbot at the time he entered the convent. He was probably one of four contemporary Heinrichs who lived among the members of the convent who were eligible to vote in 1270. His first mention by full name dates from 1275. Heinrich was one of four monks who had stood by Rumo. From 1278 he appears as porter. He is one of the three monks who lodged a complaint against Abbot Wilhelm von Montfort with King Rudolf.

On 11 October 1301 he was elected abbot. However, two conventuals proposed a different candidate, Ulrich von Trauchburg, who was also keen on the office. The resulting dispute was handled by financially compensating Ulrich. Heinrich also gained the intercession of the bishop of Constance by leaving him Wurmlingen. The ordination took place in St. George's Abbey in Stein am Rhein.

On 7 December 1301 King Albert bestowed the jura regalia on Heinrich, but disallowed another pledging of the Reichsvogtei. One of the principal reasons for this was the resistance of the citizens of St. Gall.

He fell ill halfway through the year 1316 at over 90 years old and died two years later.

== Works ==
Heinrich von Ramstein also encountered resistance against all his efforts as abbot. He tried to pay the inherited debt by two means; the first was to sell abbey property. The second measure, namely raising taxes, led to opposition within the abbey. The protests and wishes of Conventuals were so great that he had to name his brother Diethelm as guardian of the abbey for three years.

Rebuilding Wil presented the next problem. Albert denied Heinrich's wishes to rebuild the city – as well as the demolition of Schwarzenbach – because the King claimed the Vogtei over Wil, among other reasons. The death of the king did not solve the issue, as King Henry VII also did not yield the "Vogtei". Even so, he did confirm the old rights on 17 April 1309.

Heinrich did regain control of the Vogtei over Wil on 1 May 1310. A settlement of the pledge sum of 1300 Mark, which was agreed upon with Adolf of Nassau was reached on 22 April 1311. The city and the abbey of St. Gallen fell victim to a devastating fire on 13 October 1314, prompting Heinrich to task Provost Heinrich von Lupfen and the citizen Konrad Kuchimeister with the reconstruction of the abbey.

== Links ==
- Ramstein, Heinrich von in German, French and Italian in the online Historical Dictionary of Switzerland.
