= Ulrich von Tegerfelden =

Bishop of Chur and Abbot of St. Gall

Ulrich von Tegerfelden (died 12 April between 1200 and 1204 in Saint Gall) was Bishop of Chur and Abbot of Saint Gall.

== Life ==
Ulrich descended from the Aargau family of Tegerfelden; his nephew Konrad was Bishop of Konstanz. From 1166 to 1167, he was provost and after 1167 abbot in Saint Gall. In 1170, he was elected Bishop of Chur, but retained the office of abbot. During his term of office, the reconstruction of the cathedral, whose choir was sanctified by Bishop Berno von Schwerin in 1178, was commenced. After the Third Council of the Lateran had militated against the accumulation of church offices, Ulrich renounced the Bishopric of Chur in 1179, but remained Abbot of Saint Gall. As Abbot of Saint Gall, he renewed the existing fraternity with the Electorate of Mainz in 1187. In 1199, shortly before his death, he renounced his abbacy. He died on 12 April, the exact year of death is unknown. Ulrich was probably never consecrated as bishop. This is also indicated by the sanctification of the cathedral through Berno.

== Reading list ==
- Gössi, Anton: St. Gallen - Äbte: Ulrich von Tegerfelden, 1167-1199. in: Helvetia Sacra, III: Die Orden mit Benediktinerregel. 2/1: Frühe Klöster, die Benediktiner und Benediktinerinnen in der Schweiz. Francke Verlag, Bern 1986, p. 1294-95.
- Wenneker, Erich: Ulrich III. in: Biographisch-Bibliographisches Kirchenlexikon (BBKL), Vol 12. Bautz, Herzberg 1997, p. 894–95.
