= Ulrich von Sax =

Abbot of Saint Gall

Ulrich von Sax (before 1204 – 23 September 1220) was Abbot of Saint Gall from 1204 until his death.

== Life ==
Ulrich descended from the House of Sax, which had property in eastern Switzerland. He was the son of Albrecht von Sax. After his studies in Paris and Bologna, he became the doorman at the Abbey of Saint Gall and was elected abbot on 18 December 1204. Ulrich probably received the jura regalia from King Philip. He supported his brother Heinrich in his battle against Hugo I of Montfort. Ulrich awarded his brother Heinrich the bailiwick over the abbey, which he had accroached after Philip's death. However, after Otto IV established himself as king, Ulrich's brother had to release the bailiwick again. In 1208, a dispute arose with Werner von Staufen, the Bishop of Konstanz, concerning Rheineck Castle. The dispute ended with Ulrich's defeat at Breitfeld. The chapel on the former battlefield commemorates the bloodshed.

When Frederick II from the Hohenstaufen family moved to Germany in 1212, Ulrich met him and accompanied him to Basel. From then on, he is often found in proximity to Frederick. Ulrich was in charge of Frederick's legation to Pope Innocent III who assigned him the right of wearing the mitre. In 1217, Honorius III endowed him with the right to mitre and ring. Several times, Ulrich was appointed referee by the Pope in church disputes. He expanded the abbey's rule. Together with his brother Heinrich, he built Clanx Castle and he also displayed extensive construction activity in Saint Gall by building a maternity home for poor women. Ulrich was preparing to go to Italy with Frederick II, when he died of a fever in 1220.
