= Bernard of Saint Gall =

Bernard (German: Bernhard; died 9 June ?) was abbot of the benedictine Abbey of Saint Gall from 883 until 890.

Bernhard was in all likelihood born from nobility, as suggested by the epithets 'nobilis' and 'serenissimus' in contemporary documents. He also appears as provost in several documents before being elected abbot by the monks. The election occurred in the presence of emperor Charles III, who would go on to confirm the abbey's immunity and right of inquisition four years later (884). Arnulf, Charles' successor, likewise saw the abbey favourably. However, Bernhard conspired against him and as a consequence, Arnulf deposed him. The deposition is documented in Arnulf's documents from 14 May 890 as well as documents of Louis the Child from 24 June 903. His last mention as abbot occurs in a document from 14 May 890.

== See also ==
- "Bernhard" in German, French and Italian in the online Historical Dictionary of Switzerland.
