= Manegold of Mammern =

Abbot of St. Gall

Manegold von Mammern (also Manegold von Böttstein-Mammern; died 1 May 1133) was abbot of the Abbey of Saint Gall from 1121 to 1133. He descended from a noble family from the area around Untersee. He is documented for the years 1125 and 1126.

== Works ==
After Heinrich von Twiel had been elected abbot by the emperor-supporting party of the convent in 1121, his opponents contested the legitimacy of his election and appointed Manegold von Mammern as abbot. The official inauguration occurred in September 1122. Manegold focused his work as abbot on the restoration of the erstwhile property of the abbey. This had become necessary because both he and his opponent, Heinrich von Twiel, had in the course of the battle for the abbacy tried to build a loyal following by means of granting fief. Manegold succeeded in restoring the monastery property north of Lake Constance to the Abbey of Saint Gall. In order to secure the restored property, he built Castle Praßberg near Wangen. In Saint Gall, he also acted as constructor. He let the ceiling covering the nave of the church of Saint Gall be ornamented with Christ's genealogy and the tower of the school with a painting of the Last Judgement.
