= John II (bishop of Constance) =

German abbot

John II (died 9 February 782) was the abbot of Saint Gall and of Reichenau and, from 760 to 782, was the Bishop of Constance.

Initially, John was a monk at the Abbey of Reichenau. When Othmar was taken prisoner by Bishop Sidonius in the year 759, John was appointed abbot of Saint Gall. After 4 July 760, he became abbot of the Abbey of Reichenau and Bishop of Constance. He held the offices in personal union. According to the Necrology of Reichenau, John died on 9 February 782.

As abbot of Saint Gall, John pursued a specific property and acquisition policy in southern Breisgau, eastern and southern Thurgau, and across Lake Constance in Linzgau and Argengau. He established the connections to the properties south of Lake Constance through the acquisition of property in Romanshorn and Steinach near Arbon. Under Abbot John, the contingent donations began to take place where the donors kept the property assigned to the monastery, but committed themselves to an annual payment of interest. In this way, relationships between the monastery and the people developed which were fostered and checked by Abbot John in line with Frankish politics. The result was the increasing delimitation of the areas of influence of Saint Gall and Constance leading to a contract between the abbey and the bishopric which was confirmed by Charlemagne in 780. During John's role as Abbot of Saint Gall, Winithar was head of the scriptorium and the school of Saint Gall. He is the first in this office who is known by name.

== Reading List ==
- Helmut Maurer: Die Konstanzer Bischöfe vom Ende des 6. Jahrhunderts bis 1206 (Germania sacra; NF 42,1; Die Bistümer der Kirchenprovinz Mainz. Das Bistum Konstanz; 5). Walter de Gruyter, Berlin/New York 2003, ISBN 3-11-017664-5, S. 49–53. (Digitalisat)
- Anton Gössi: St. Gallen - Äbte: Johannes, 759/60–782. In: Helvetia Sacra, Abt. III: Die Orden mit Benediktinerregel, Bd. 2/1: Frühe Klöster, die Benediktiner und Benediktinerinnen in der Schweiz. Francke Verlag, Bern 1986, S. 1268 f.
