= Werdo =

Werdo (born before 778; died 30 March 812) was abbot of the Abbey of Saint Gall in St. Gallen.

The diocesan priest Werdo was first mentioned in records in 778. After the resignation of Waldo von Reichenau in 784, he was named abbot of the Abbey of Saint Gall by the bishop Egino von Konstanz (from the bishopric of Constance). He is presumed to have died on 30 March 812.

== Works ==
Werdo was only accepted as abbot by the monks when he adopted a monk's life. He was highly dependent upon bishop Egino throughout his tenure. He is thus associated with Egino in many documents. Werdo's rule followed the model of Johannes II of Konstanz, especially regarding the expansive acquisition policy. Under his rule, the abbey acquired numerous estates in the area between the Danube and the Neckar. The first advocati in St. Gallen also appeared during this time. Their task was to assist the abbot or his delegate in the holding of court proceedings and legal transactions.
