= Purchart I =

Purchart I (born c. 920/930; died 9 August 975) was the abbot of the Benedictine abbey of Saint Gall from 958 until 971.

== Life ==
Purchart came from the family of the Udalrichings (Udalrichinger). His father was probably count Ulrich V; his mother was named Wendelgard. He was probably born between 920 and 930. He came into the Abbey of Saint Gall at a young age as an oblate and was made deacon under Craloh. His first documented mention is dated at 959/60.

His predecessor Ekkehart I, whom Craloh had selected to be his successor, but an injury following a riding accident prevented him from holding office. Ekkehart I thus selected Purchart to be successor and he subsequently became abbot. However, due to also being injured in a riding accident, he could not attend to all of his duties.

He received the confirmation of immunity and all other rights and possessions from Pope John XIII in 967.

== Works ==
Purchart was very popular with the monks due to his benevolence. However, economy and discipline suffered under his rule because he could not conduct business himself due to his leg injury. He entrusted those duties to the aging deacon and chamberlain. The emperor visited the Abbey in order to determine economic measures. Abbot Kerbodo of Lorsch was entrusted to carry out reforms which he recorded in the statutes during a longer stay in Saint Gall. Those statutes remained authoritative. Purchart also built the St. Gallus Chapel. After abdicating his office in 971 he wished to live the last years of his life in its vicinity as a recluse verbringen. Bishop Conrad of Constance, however, opposed this plan due to Purchart's poor health.

Purchart was laid to rest next to the entrance of the chapel by bishop Conrad of Constance in 975.

== Reading list ==
- Vogler, Werner: Kurzbiographien der Äbte. in: Johannes Duft, Anton Gössi, Werner Vogler (eds.): Die Abtei St. Gallen. St. Gallen 1986, ISBN 3-906616-15-0, p. 115.

== External list ==
- Purchart in German, French and Italian in the online Historical Dictionary of Switzerland.
