= Beda Angehrn =

Prince-abbot (b. 1725, d. 1796)

Beda Angehrn (born 7 December 1725 in Hagenwil, modern day Amriswil; died 19 May 1796 in St. Gallen) was prince-abbot of the Abbey of Saint Gall from 1767 until 1796.

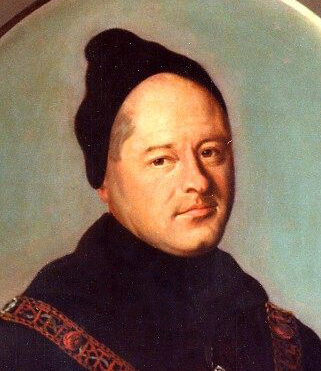
Abbot Beda Angehrn around 1770

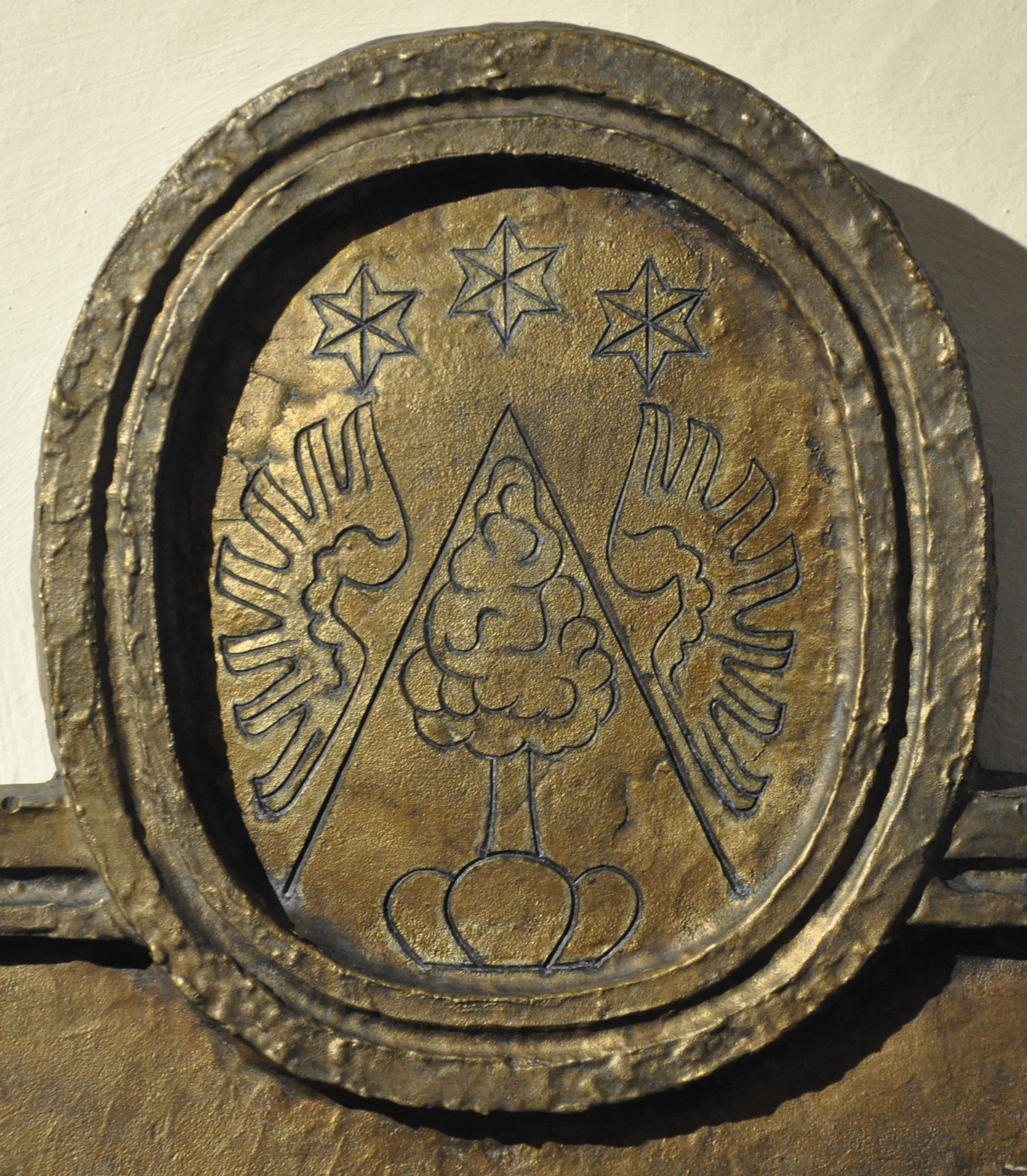
Family coat of arms

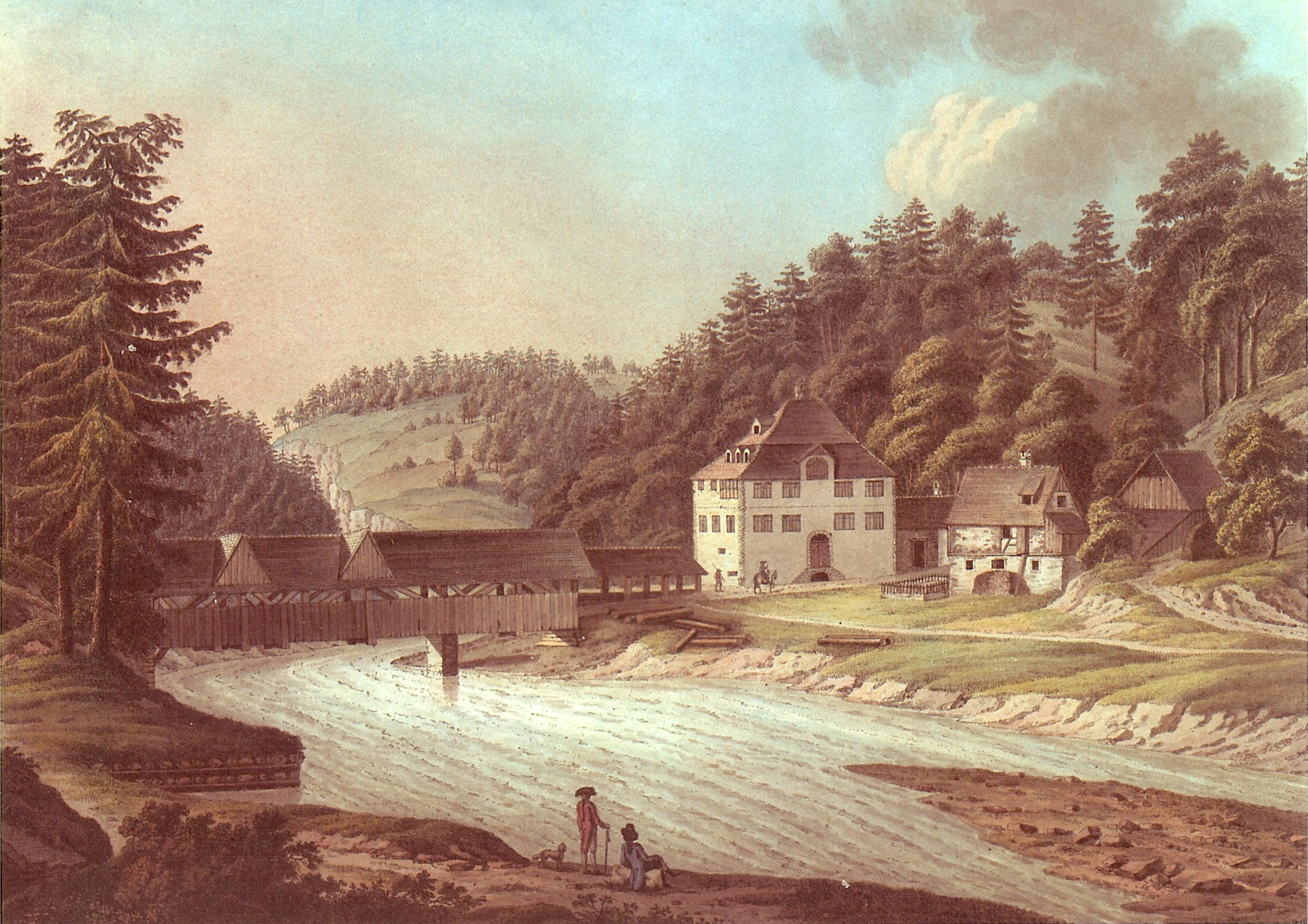
Crossing over the Sitter with the tollhouse (middle) erected by Abbot Beda.

== Life ==
Johann Konrad Angehrn was the son of the surgeon and Gerichtsammann Johann Konrad and his wife Maria Katharina (née Willi). He studied at the Jesuit College Konstanz and later at the benedictine Abbey of Saint Gall. He took his vows in the Abbey in 1744 and was given the monastic name Beda. He was subsequently ordained priest in 1749. He taught theology and philosophy in St. Gallen for 12 years. In 1753 he was made professor of theology. In 1763 Beda was appointed prior and Stadtholder of St. Johann in the Thur valley. On 11 March 1767 the Nuncio Luigi Valenti Gonzaga presided the election where Beda was ultimately elected abbot. Pope Clement XIII confirmed the election on 27 April 1767, while the benediction was given by the Nuncio on 8 September 1767. On 19 December 1767, Emperor Joseph II granted him the Jura Regalia.

Abbot Beda achieved lasting significance through his efforts in road construction. The Fürstenlandstrasse connecting Rorschach, St. Gallen, and Wil is generally regarded as his most important work and is an important connection between the abbey-principality and the Old Swiss Confederacy. The military and scientific endeavour of the Abbey were also lastingly improved by the Abbot. However, in his plans he failed to consider the available means, which led to the ruin of the Abbey's finances. He also disregarded the control rights of the chapter and ruled his realm autocratically. A few younger monks lodged complaint against the Abbot that reached the pope, but to no avail. After the outbreak of the French Revolution in 1789, the Gotteshausleute, i.e. the inhabitants of the Abbey, demanded more rights. When lamentations culminated in revolutionary movements in 1794, Prince-abbot Beda yielded remarkably easily. Despite his chapter being against him, he made wide admissions without much resistance. In the "Gütlicher Vertrag" (amicable agreement) of Gossau of 1795 he abolished the serfdom and abandoned further feudal rights or narrowed them. The convent agreed to the treaty on 18 January 1796.

Abbot Beda died on 19 May 1796 in Saint Gall.

== Works ==
- Oraison funèbre de ... Beda Anghern d'Hagenwyl, Prince-Abbé de Saint-Gall..., à prononcer Le 19 Mai 1797, jour de l'anniversaire de sa mort... [S.l.]: [s.n.], [ca. 1797]
- Einiges aus den Tagebüchern des Fürstabtes Beda von St. Gallen (reg. 1767-96). published by Pfr. K[arl] Steiger. special print, St. Gallen: Buchdruckerei <<Ostschweiz>>, 1919.

== Reading list ==
- Beda Angehrn, in: Helvetia Sacra III/1/2 (1986), S. 1345–1348.
- Johannes Duft: Die Abtei St.Gallen. St. Gallen 1986
- Otto Feger (1953). "Angehrn, Beda". Neue Deutsche Biographie (in German). Vol. 1. Berlin: Duncker & Humblot. p. 288. (full text online). (NDB). Band 1, Duncker & Humblot, Berlin 1953, ISBN 3-428-00182-6, p. 288 (Digital copy).
- 'Angehrn, Beda' in German, French and Italian in the online Historical Dictionary of Switzerland. in: Historisches Lexikon der Schweiz.
- Hermann Wartmann (1875). "Angehrn, Beda". Allgemeine Deutsche Biographie (in German). Vol. 1. Leipzig: Duncker & Humblot. p. 452. (ADB). Band 1, Duncker & Humblot, Leipzig 1875, p. 452.
