= Falkenstein =

Falkenstein or Falckenstein ("falcons' stone" in German) may refer to:

== Places ==
=== Austria ===
- Falkenstein, Lower Austria, a market town in the district of Mistelbach

=== Germany ===
- Falkenstein, Bavaria, a market town in the district of Cham
- Falkenstein, Rhineland-Palatinate, a municipality in Donnersbergkreis
- Falkenstein, Saxony, a town in Vogtlandkreis
- Falkenstein, Saxony-Anhalt, a town in Harz district
- Falkenstein (Thuringia), a rock formation near Tambach-Dietharz in the Thuringian Forest
- Falkenstein, Königstein im Taunus, a small town north of Frankfurt am Main
- Großer Falkenstein, a mountain in the Bavarian Forest

== Castles ==
=== Austria ===
- Falkenstein Castle (Lower Austria), a medieval ruin north of Vienna
- Falkenstein Castle (Niederfalkenstein), a preserved medieval castle in Carinthia
- Burgruine Falkenstein (Oberfalkenstein), a neighbouring ruined medieval castle in Carinthia

=== Czech Republic ===
- Falkenštejn Castle, a peak and medieval castle in Bohemian Switzerland

=== France ===
- Château du Falkenstein, a ruined castle in the commune of Philippsbourg in the Moselle département

=== Germany ===
- Falkenstein Castle (Bad Emstal), a ruin near Bad Emstal, Hesse
- Falkenstein Castle (Gerstetten), a ruin near Gerstetten in Heidenheim district of Baden-Württemberg
- Falkenstein Castle (Harz), a preserved medieval castle in the Harz mountains in Saxony-Anhalt
- Falkenstein Castle (Höllental), a ruin near Freiburg-im-Breisgau, Baden-Württemberg
- Falkenstein Castle (Palatinate), a ruin near Falkenstein on the Donnersberg in Rhineland-Palatinate
- Falkenstein Castle (Pfronten), a ruined castle near Pfronten, Bavaria
- Falkenstein (Saxon Switzerland), a peak and medieval castle in Saxon Switzerland
- Falkenstein Castle (Taunus), a ruined castle near Falkenstein, Hesse
- Old Falkenstein Castle (Alter Falkenstein or Alt-Falkenstein), a ruined castle in the Harz mountains near Falkenstein/Harz, Saxony-Anhalt
- Falkenstein über dem Inn, domiciles of Counts of Falkenstein in the Inn valley, Bavaria

=== Switzerland ===
- Alt-Falkenstein Castle, a ruin of a castle in Switzerland
- Neu-Falkenstein Castle, ruins near Balsthal (Klus) in Solothurn

== Dynasties ==
- Counts of Falkenstein (Bavaria), an extinct medieval dynasty in southern Bavaria
- Counts of Falkenstein (Rhineland-Palatinate)
- House of Falkenstein, a noble family from Baden-Württemberg

== Other uses ==
- Castle Falkenstein (role-playing game)

== People with surname ==
- Adam Falkenstein (1906–1966), German Assyriologist
- Claire Falkenstein (1908–1997), American sculptor
- Max Falkenstien (1924–2019), longtime radio announcer for the Kansas Jayhawks and member of the Naismith Basketball Hall of Fame
- Tony Falkenstein (American football) (1915–1994), American footballer
- Tony Falkenstein (entrepreneur), New Zealand philanthropist
- Eduard Vogel von Falckenstein (1797–1885), Prussian general
- Maximilian Vogel von Falckenstein (1839–1917), Prussian general
- Waldeen Falkenstein (1913–1993), American dancer and choreographer
