= Ulrich von Veringen =

Abbot of the Abbey of St. Gall

Ulrich von Veringen (died 15 January 1200 in Saint Gall) was abbot of the Abbey of Saint Gall from 1199 to 1200. He descended from the counts of Veringen and was probably the son of Count Marquard von Veringen and a brother of Count Heinrich and Count Manegold von Veringen.

== Works ==
Formerly a provost, Ulrich von Veringen was elected Abbot of Saint Gall on 4 February 1199. During his short term of office, which only lasted 49 weeks, the abbey accumulated substantial debts, wherefore Abbot Ulrich found himself forced to pawn the monastery farms Romanshorn, Hüttenwil and Elgg and sell parts of the monastery treasure. At the time of his death on 15 January 1200, the abbey exhibited a debt of 70 pounds.
