= Ymmo =

Ymmo (died 30 October 984) was abbot of the Abbey of Saint Gall from 976 to 984.

== Life ==
Ymmo succeeded Ekkehart I as dean in 973. Around the middle of January 976, he was elected abbot and invested by Emperor Otto II. In the records, he is mentioned three times as abbot: in 976, on 29 October 980 and in 981. He took sides with Emperor Otto II when he came in conflict with the Bavarian Duke Henry II.

== Works ==
Like his predecessor Notker, Ymmo was regarded as a gentle abbot. However, he is also described as a strict follower of the Rule of Saint Benedict (Latin: Regula Benedicti). Ymmo succeeded in initiating an economic revival for the abbey and also managed to recover or acquire new property. The Church treasure accreted under his rule, wherefore he was able to let new frescos be painted in the churches of Gallus and Othmar. Furthermore, he built the chapel for the holy grave with a crypt dedicated to Saint Ulrich.
