= Heinrich von Mansdorf =

Abbot of St. Gall

Heinrich von Mansdorf (born before 1419; died 13 September 1426 in Freiburg im Breisgau) was abbot of the Abbey of Saint Gall from 1419 to 1426.

== Life ==
Heinrich became Abbot of Saint Gall after Konrad von Pegau had abdicated. He was appointed by Pope Martin V. Before that, he had been provost of the Abbey of Schkölen in the Bishopric of Naumburg-Zeitz.

== Works ==
As was the custom, Heinrich soon after his inauguration, on 9 July 1419, confirmed the rights and liberties of the city of Saint Gall. On 10 und 11 August 1419, he confirmed those of the city of Wil and on 27 August those of the city of Wangen. Abbot Heinrich tried to enhance the economic foundation of the abbey. To this end, he wanted to resolve the dispute with Appenzell, which had begun during the reign of Kuno von Stoffeln and had culminated in the Appenzell Wars in which Saint Gall had been defeated. For 11 years, the Appenzeller had been refusing to pay interest. The seven villages held several fruitless law conferences and finally, on 6 May 1421, made an award that was accepted by Abbot Heinrich, but ignored by the Appenzeller. Heinrich's request for King Sigismund's support was also unsuccessful: the king confirmed all fiefs, rights and liberties of the monastery on 10 August 1422 and admonished the surrounding forces to attend to the Abbey of Saint Gall's business, but nobody acted on this admonition. Eventually, the church authorities supported Heinrich. On 10 December 1425, the Domscholasticus of Speyer, Berchtold von Wildungen, assumed the regularisation of Appenzell. On 4 February 1426, he called on the Appenzeller to subject to the abbey's rule within 30 days. The Appenzeller thereupon agreed to negotiations, but they were too late: on 10 April 1426, they were excommunicated. Abbot Heinrich died on the journey back from Speyer, where he had pursued the aggravation of the Appenzeller banishment, in Freiburg im Breisgau. He was buried in St. Blasien.
