= Anno of Saint Gall =

Anno of Saint Gall (died 1 December 954) was anti-abbot to Craloh in the Benedictine Abbey of Saint Gall.

Anno is not attestable in documents before his election as anti-abbot. He began his tenure on 23 or 24 September 953, after which he is not mentioned in any documents again.

According to Ekkehart IV, Anno began to fortify the abbey and the village of Saint Gall by building a wall, a moat and towers. At the time of his death, the wall had reportedly reached knee-height.
