= Ulrich von Güttingen =

Ulrich von Güttingen (died 14 February 1277) was the abbot of the Abbey of Saint Gall from 1272 until his death.

Ulrich came from a baronial family of the Thurgau. He was a relative of the earlier abbot Rudolf von Güttingen. He is not mentioned in any surviving source before his election as abbot in 1272. Ulrich was elected by only a minority of monks, the majority choosing Heinrich von Wartenberg. He did have the support, however, of the ministerials and burghers of the town of Saint Gall. The disputed election was followed by armed conflict. Although Ulrich emerged victorious, the abbey was ruined.

When Heinrich von Wartenberg died unexpectedly during the feud, his followers elected Rumo von Ramstein as the new abbot. The abbey thus again had two abbots. The feud concerning the legitimacy of the abbacy continued throughout Ulrich's tenure, but was somewhat lessened in severity.

Dependent on the burghers for his position, Ulrich granted them a charter that expanded their rights and privileges in 1272 or 1273. He supported the newly elected King Rudolf I of Germany after 1273, spending long periods at his court in an effort to improve the terms of the imperial advocacy (Reichsvogtei) over Saint Gall. To finance these stays, Ulrich had to cede abbatial lands to the crown. All of this proved futile, since Rudolf appointed one of the abbey's own ministerials, Ulrich von Ramschwag, as advocate over Ulrich's objections.

Ulrich died on the 14 February 1277. No direct successor was elected, as Rumo was accepted by both parties as the legitimate abbot.
