= Ulrich II of Saint Gall =

Ulrich II (died 9 December 1076) was abbot of the Abbey of Saint Gall from 1072 to 1076.

== Life ==
Abbot Nortpert appointed the provost Ulrich as his successor when he abdicated in 1072. Nothing is known about Ulrich's life before his inauguration as abbot.
