= Rumo von Ramstein =

13th-century abbot of the Abbey of Saint Gall

Rumo von Ramstein (died ca. 1300) was abbot of the Abbey of Saint Gall from 1274 until 1281.

The monk Rumo was a member of the noble family of Ramstein. He was camerarius, sacristan and deacon under the leadership of Abbot Berchtold von Falkenstein (1244-1272) and his immediate successor, Heinrich III von Wartenberg (1272-1274) until the death of the latter. He was then elected anti-abbot to Ulrich VII von Güttingen (1272-1277). After Ulrich's death, Rumo was universally accepted. He staged an economic buy-out of the abbey while disputes with abbey subjects in Appenzell and the Klostervogt were exacerbating the state of affairs. As a result, Rumo abdicated his position in 1281 for a yearly compensation of 100 marks. The document detailing the amount and origin of his pension is dated 15 January 1282. It is the first reference in a document of cheese from the region of Appenzell, as the abbot was to be given 60 cheese loaves a year from the village of Gais, each roughly worth eight denarii. Rumo died between 1297 and 1303.

== Reading list ==
- Georg von Wildenstein. In: Helvetia Sacra. III/1/2 (1986), p. 1305-6.
- Harter, Hans: Adel und Burgen im oberen Kinziggebiet. Studien zur Besiedlung und hochmittelalterlichen Herrschaftsbildung im mittelalterlichen Schwarzwald. In: Forschungen zur oberrheinischen Landesgeschichte. 37, Freiburg i. Br./München 1992.
- Harter, Hans: Adel auf Falkenstein und Schilteck. in: Schramberg. Herrschaft – Markflecken – Industriestadt. Museums- und Geschichtsverein Schramberg u. d. Großen Kreisstadt Schramberg, Schramberg 2004, p. 55–82.
