= Thieto =

Thieto (6 April ? – after 942) was abbot of the Benedictine Abbey of Saint Gall from 933 to 942.

== Life ==
The name Thieto appears many times both in the book of vows of Saint Gall and in the monks' registers of the books of fraternisation. Therefore one cannot say anything conclusive about his life before becoming abbot. During his tenure as abbot he is mentioned in documents twice; once in an undated document and once in a certificate by Otto I from 7 April 940, in which Thieto is granted immunity, suffrage and the right of inquisition (German: Inquisitionsrecht). Important for the rest of his tenure was the fire which was far more destructive than the Hungarians' invasion in 926 during the tenure of his predecessor Engilbert. The fire was started by a student and destroyed the majority of the complex. Thieto began reconstruction but did not finish it. He abdicated his office on 31 May 942.
