= Custos (under-sacristan) =

Former Roman Catholic office

The under-sacristan or custos was a Roman Catholic office.

The office is mentioned in the Decretals. He was the assistant of the sacristan, was subject to the archdeacon, and discharged duties very similar to those of the sacristan. By the early twentieth century the office was hardly ever attached to a benefice and so usually a salaried position. The Council of Trent desired that, according to the old canons, clerics should hold such offices; but in most churches, on account of the difficulty or impossibility of obtaining clerics, laymen perform many of the duties of the sacristan and under-sacristan.

In some European medieval contexts, a custos was given the more important roles of keeping the safety of the church, its relics, its treasure, and its archives, but was also responsible for the perception of capitationes, symbolic head-taxes that associated freemen with a religious institution.
