= Ulrich Rösch =

German abbot

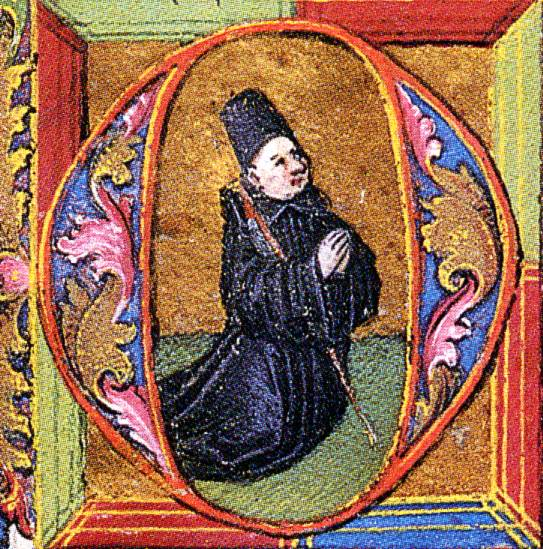
Ulrich Rösch at prayer

Ulrich Rösch (born 14 February 1426 in Wangen im Allgäu; died 13 March 1491 in Wil) was abbot of the Abbey of Saint Gall from 1463 to 1491. He is considered one of the most outstanding abbots of the monastery.

== Life ==
Rösch, the son of a baker, was the first Abbot of Saint Gall from civic descent. He was accepted at the monastery school on the grounds of his talent and became a monk between 1440 and 1445. In 1451, he became Grosskeller, but only two years later, he had to leave the monastery again. In 1453/1454, he lived at Wiblingen Abbey near Ulm.

== Works ==
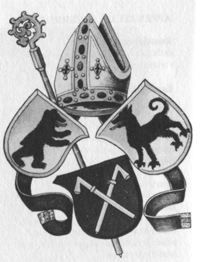
The abbot's coat of arms with the coat of arms of the prince abbey (top left) and the county of Toggenburg (top right)

After his return to his home monastery, Rösch became the leader of the reform-minded conventuals who protested against their transformation into an Augustinian canon. In 1457, Rösch became administrator, after Abbot Kaspar von Breitenlandenberg had been suspended in the course of a visitation. Von Breitenlandenberg abdicated in 1463 due to illness, whereupon Rösch also formally became abbot in his stead. Von Breitenlandenberg died in the same year.

Rösch’s time as abbot is marked by the strengthening of monastic discipline, and especially by the consolidation of the monastery’s finances and the powerful extension of the sovereignty of the prince abbey. His plan to move the monastery to Rorschach, in order to free it from the grasp of the city of Saint Gall, failed because Saint Gall’s citizens, in alliance with the Appenzeller in the Rorschacher Klosterbuch, destroyed the initiated constructions in Rorschach in 1489. Although the confederate refuges of the abbey enforced compensation payment, the monastery remained in the city of Saint Gall. Rösch also furthered the spiritual life in the abbey and protruded in his function as constructor.
