= Domkustos =

The Domkustos of a cathedral in German-speaking countries is responsible for its physical maintenance, furniture, decoration and security, including the safekeeping of the cathedral treasure, as well as arranging for cleaning, preparation for the services and ringing the bells. His or her subordinate is the Subkustos. The word "kustos" is derived from the Latin word custodia which has the sense of custody, guard, protection, preservation, oversight, care, welfare.

Because of the duty to guard the cathedral treasure, in several cathedral churches, such as Magdeburg, the term Thesaurar ("treasurer") was used instead of Domkustos. Elsewhere the title Thesaurar usually referred to the person responsible to the dean for handling income.

The office of Domkustos may either be a senior, independent post within the cathedral chapter as, for example, until 1806 in Salzburg, one of the offices under the dean or provost (Domdekan), as in Mainz, or carried out in combination with other duties by one person.

Frequently the Domkustos is the head of the cathedral construction department and its workshop (Dombauhütte). Formerly its responsibility usually extended to other buildings in the Domimmunität.
