= Ulrich of Eppenstein =

Ulrich of Eppenstein (c. 1047?–1121) served between 1071 and his death as Abbot of the powerful Abbey of Saint Gall. Ulrich was prominent as a supporter of Emperor Henry IV during the civil wars that erupted out of the power struggles between the emperor and the papacy during the closing decades of the eleventh century.

== Name ==
Sources that focus on his role as Abbot of St. Gallen sometimes refer to him as Ulrich III of St Gallen. In 1086 he was also appointed Patriarch of Aquileia, in respect of which sources may refer to him as Ulrich I of Aquileia.

== Life ==
=== Family provenance ===
Ulrich was born into the Eppensteiner family, a leading family in Carantania. His father, Markwart von Eppenstein, was a supporter of the emperor in his conflicts with Rome. His mother, Liutbirg of Plain, was a daughter of Wilhelm of the Sann. Of his known siblings the eldest, Liutold of Eppenstein, would succeed to their father's dukedom and lands in 1177. The second brother, Henry, succeeded when Luitold died in 1190. The third brother, called Markwart, probably died young. Ulrich entered the church: he was the fourth son. All the brothers who lived long enough to feature in the sources participated actively in the Investiture Controversy in support of the emperor. Because of the way local rivalries became intertwined with continental politics, this meant sustained conflict closer to home with dynastic families supporting the papacy, notably the von Zähringens and the von Rheinfeldens.

=== Office ===
The Eppensteiners and the Emperor Henry IV shared their descent from Herman II of Swabia, who was probably Ulrich's great grandfather, and the emperor saw in young Ulrich a loyal supporter. In 1077 Ulrich was appointed Abbot of Saint Gall / Saint Gallen in succession to the abbot Ulrich II who had died on 9 December 1076. The appointment was contested by the "anti-abbot" Lutold between 1177 and 1183. Lutold's appointment was conferred by the "anti-king", Rudolf of Rheinfelden. One objection cited for Ulrich's appointment was that he was young - aged "only about 30". Lutold came from the nearby Abbey of Reichenau, but sources indicated that the monks at St. Gallen nevertheless favoured the newcomer to monasticism, Ulrich, in the war that enfolded him because they, like Ulrich, backed the emperor against the pope. Two years later Ulrich himself was given the additional appointment of "anti-abbot" of Reichenau, but the Monastery at Reichenau supported the papal cause and Ulich's base remained at St. Gallen. In 1083 St Gallen itself was attacked by an army led by Folknand von Toggenburg, but Ulrich managed to drive off the attackers. Another assault in 1086 seems to have been less serious. Nevertheless, by 1086 the abbey had been impoverished, and many of the church ornaments had been sold.

The "anti-abbot" Lutold was replaced in 1083 by a new "anti-abbot", another Reichenau monk called Werinhar, and one source indicates that Werinhar successfully supplanted Ulrich for a time. Meanwhile, on the international stage the "anti-king", Rudolf of Rheinfelden had died following a battle in 1080; his place as "anti-king" being taken by Hermann of Salm. Hermann was less effective as a leader for the papal side than Rudolf had been. Support for the rebellion against the emperor was fading: in St. Gallen the "anti-abbot", Werinhar, formally abdicated his claim in 1086, possibly persuaded to do so by the resistance he met from St. Gallen's monks, and calm slowly returned. As a reward for his energetic loyalty, in 1086 the emperor conferred on Ulrich the Patriarchate of Aquileia, a wealthy region where his elder brother, Henry already exercised secular overlordship in support of the emperor. It is believed that in it was Ulrich of Eppenstein who in 1119 established at Moggio a Benedictine monastery, dedicated to Saint Gall. Moggio was along the route between St. Gallen and Aquileia and the new foundation was presumably intended to strengthen communication links between the region of Ulrich's patriarchate and his Abbey of Saint Gall.

=== Death ===
Ulrich von Eppenstein probably died on 13 December 1121 at Aquileia. However, residual uncertainty as to his date of death remains because of other surviving entries in the records at St. Gallen which support the dates 2 April and 7 October as anniversaries of his death.
