= Codex Sangallensis =

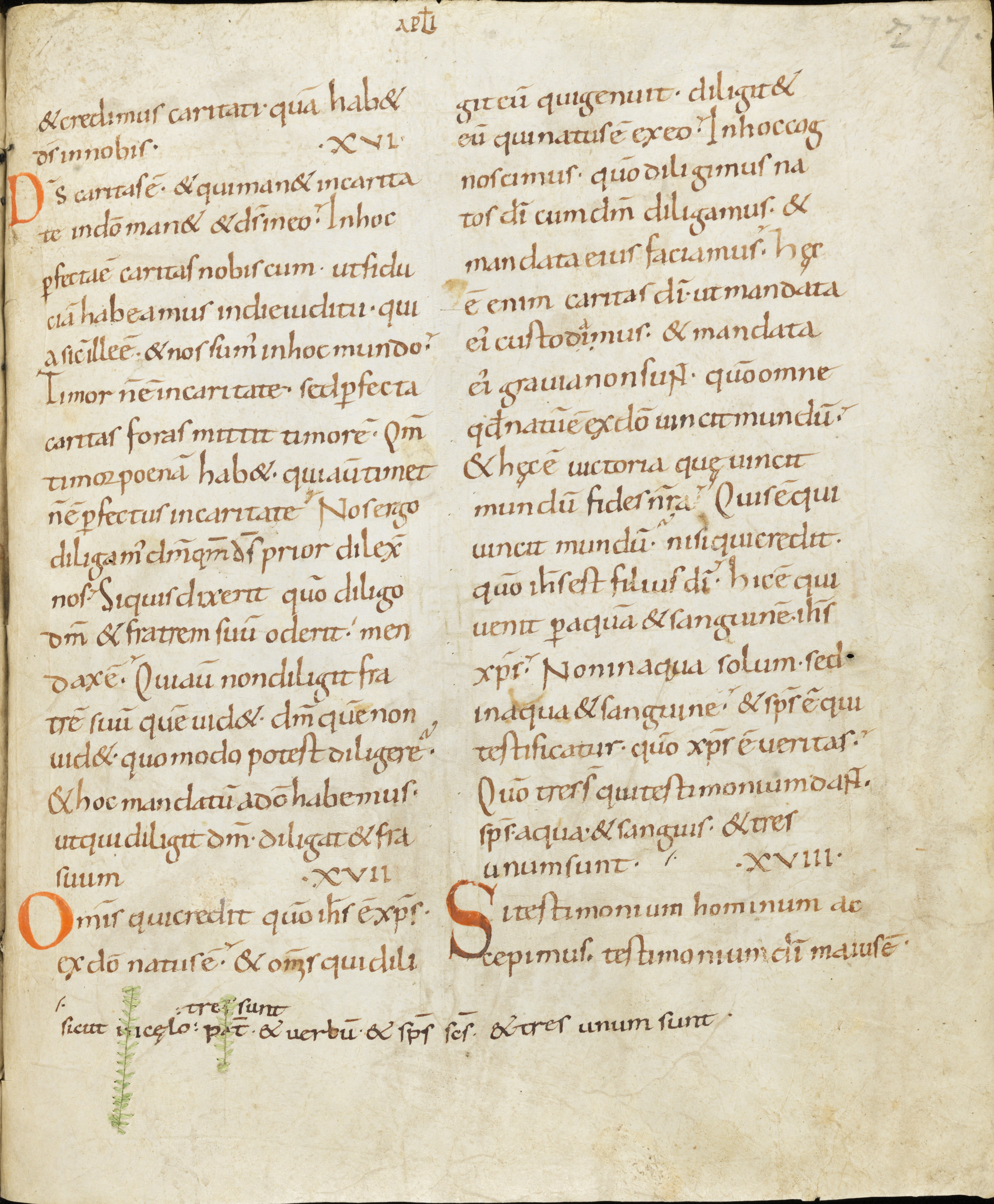
Page 277 of the codex, with the Comma Johanneum at the bottom margin

Codex Sangallensis (plural Codices Sangallenses) is the designation of codices housed at the Abbey library of Saint Gall in St. Gallen. The codices are indexed with a continuous Arabic number of up to four digits. Many of the codices have been digitized through the e-codices project in Switzerland, with over 2000 of them freely available online.

Notable Codices Sangallenses include:

- Codex Sangallensis 18 (0130 on the list Gregory-Aland) — fragments of the gospels of Mark and Luke in Greek; 9th century
- Codex Sangallensis 22, the Golden Psalter of St. Gallen
- Codex Sangallensis 48 (037 on the list Gregory-Aland) — four gospels in Greek with only one lacuna; 9th/10th century
- Codex Sangallensis 51 (48 on the list Beuron) — four gospels in Latin; 8th century
- Codex Sangallensis 53 — also known as Evangelium Longum, a book known mostly for its valuable covers.
- Codex Sangallensis 56 — Diatessaron in Latin; 9th century; copy of the Codex Fuldensis
- Codex Sangallensis 63 — manuscript of Vulgate
- Codex Sangallensis 190 — 12 letters of Ruricius
- Codex Sangallensis 381
- Codex Sangallensis 397
- Codex Sangallensis 484
- Codex Sangallensis 878 — grammatical texts, including the Ars minor and Ars maior of Aelius Donatus, the grammar of Priscian, the Etymologiae of Isidore of Sevilla and the grammar of Alcuin
- Codex Sangallensis 904 — an Old Irish manuscript on Latin grammar
- Codex Sangallensis 907 — manuscript of Vulgate
- Codex Sangallensis 1395 — the oldest manuscript of Vulgate gospels

== See also ==
- Codex Monacensis
