= Codex Sangallensis 484 =

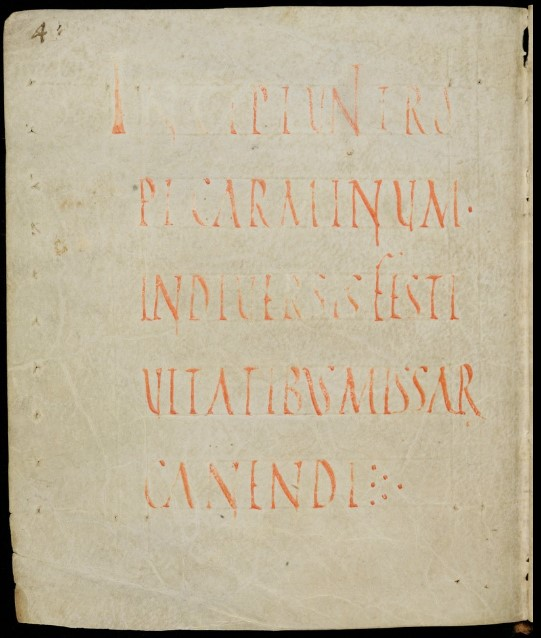
Title page of the Codex Sangallensis 484: Incipiunt tropi carminum in diversis festivitatibus missarum canendi

The Codex Sangallensis 484 (Signature Cod. Sang. 484) is an early medieval music manuscript, produced in the abbey of St. Gallen and stored in the Abbey Library in St. Gallen. The manuscript is known for its exhaustive collection of so-called tropes, meaning melodic or textual extensions to previously existing liturgic chants. As this particular manuscript is among the most extensive collections of such tropes from the eastern Frankish kingdom, it plays an important role in the history of music.

== Description ==
With a surface area of just 10cm x 8cm, the manuscript is of a smaller format than most of its contemporaries. Its contents are stretched to 318 pages and two additional pages that were paginated in post for which parchment was used as a writing material. Mainly the edges of either goat or sheep and rarely calf skins were used. The binding of the manuscript was likely replaced during its most recent restoration, as a part of which the original leather binding from the 16th century was replaced with half leather. The composition of the manuscript is attributed to one main scribe and collector of the 10th century.

== History ==
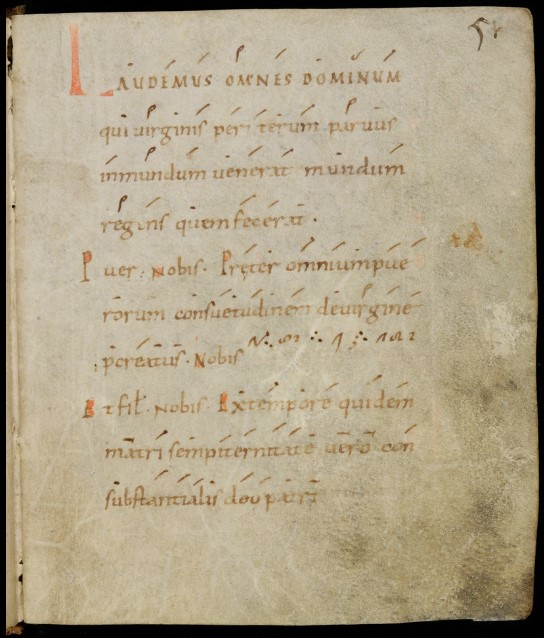
Example of the neumic notation in the Codex Sangallensis 484

The origins of the manuscript can be viewed as a part of a bigger process of trope writing, including the literary extension of originally Roman liturgy. This process was not only shaped by the three influential figures Tuotilo, Notker and Ratpert at the abbey in St. Gallen, but also occurred in the larger context of the entire Frankish empire. In its origin, the process can be traced back to a capitulary issued by Charlemagne in which he, among other things, demanded the mastery as well as the execution of the existing Roman liturgy by the clergy. A process of textualization and thus the capturing of liturgic material in the form of text and the at the time novel neumic notation developed in the Frankish kingdom. This development went hand in hand with the invention of new material in the form of sequences and tropes and outlasted the end of the 10th century. The Frankish appropriation of older liturgy in St. Gallen, particularly in its quality and quantity, is unique and is reflected in the production of several musical manuscripts, to which the Cod. Sang. 484 makes an important contribution.

The initial composition of the manuscript by the main scribe is dated in the second quarter of the 10th century, even though additional scribes made additions with the further passing of time. Moreover, analyses of the scribe’s hand in the manuscript suggest that the main scribe was in fact a monk named “Salomon”, who was affiliated with the abbey of St. Gallen and who later went on to compile the Codex Sangallensis 381 as well. This assumption is based on a charter dated in 926-928 which was signed with the name “Salomon” and whose writing can be identified as the hand featured in the Codex. In the literature, some doubts remain regarding the actual name of the scribe, which is why most publications use the neutral term Σ (sigma).

Some striking features of this manuscript are various corrections undertaken during the collection process. They mostly occur as erasures or as the rearrangement of material including the insertion of pages in numerous locations. Such clues indicate trouble with the proper arrangement of texts on behalf of the collector, who was forced to correct faulty entries in post. These troubles and occasionally clumsy efforts can be explained by the fact that this Codex was part of an ongoing process of trope compilation at the abbey at that time. It includes the collection of chants and melodies which were gathered from individual documents and were copied and compiled in book form. The motivation behind this centralisation of liturgic material is subject to some contention. However, it is assumed that it was undertaken as a reaction to the invasion of Magyar raiders in St. Gallen. It aimed to reinstate a regulated monastic life, which included the maintenance of liturgy as one of its core components. The unorganised and messy structure of the manuscripts, including passages that were initially left empty – likely in anticipation of the discovery of new material – indicate that the scribe had no overview over the abbey’s inventory of chants as they may have fallen victim to the invasion.

Furthermore, due to structural similarities, it is assumed that the Cod. Sang. 484 was merely used as a template for the later Cod. Sang. 381: The arrangement of tropes, sequence melodies, and chants of the latter corresponds exactly to that of the Cod. Sang 484. The only differences here are extensions of the Cod. Sang. 381 with additional elements as well as less prevalently featured corrections. Such differences reinforce the assumption that the Cod. Sang. 484 was used as an incomplete yet prototypical model for the Cod. Sang. 484.

It is further assumed that unlike Cod. Sang. 381, the Cod. Sang. 484 was never used in actual liturgical practice, but was restricted to its role as a point of reference for the assembly of later codices.

== Structure ==
The codex begins with a trope written in Greek on the first page and a Latin versus on page 3. It is followed by one of the most extensive known collections of such tropes in the East Frankish kingdom, which were mainly used to extend the previously existing liturgic repertoires. It begins on the fourth page with the words “Incipiunt tropi carminum in diversis festivitatibus missarum canendi” (Here begin the tropes that are to be sung along the mass chants of various celebrations). Many of the collected tropes are chants which were used as additions to existing ones, provided musical renditions of their texts, or which simply extended older liturgic chants. The tropes are accompanied by a musical notation in the form of neumes, an at the time novel way of melodic transcription.

In the Codex, the scribe took recourse to a previously existing literary tradition at the abbey of St. Gallen. Some of the collected tropes can be assigned to Tuotilo. Moreover, it is assumed that the scribe took inspiration from the arrangement of the various sequences in Notker’s Liber Ymnorum, which results in the following succession:

=== Contents ===
Contents	Page	
Proper Tropes	4-201	Tropes that vary depending on the ecclesiastical year or occasion
Ordinary Chants and Tropes	202-256	Liturgical chants that form the invariable parts of the mass, including tropes
Sequence Melodies	258-297	Liturgical chants that are sung between the Hallelujah and the Gospel in the mass. Part of the Proper. Only melodies without texts are written down here
Ordinary Chants and later additions	298-318	Additional invariable components of the liturgy and additions to the collection

== Reception ==
Particularly during the golden age of the abbey – during the time of Notker, Ratpert and Tuotilo – St. Gallen was known for the ingenuity as well as the quality of the produced chants. Consequently, individual tropes were received quite broadly within Europe: Tuotilo's “Hodie cantandus est” and the related introitus “Puer natus est”, for instance, can be found in over 100 European manuscripts, mostly concentrated in copies in German-speaking areas. Simultaneously, a not insignificant number of copies from southern France, the Alsace as well as northern Italy have been recorded. Further tropes also appear in manuscripts in the same areas, but not to the same extent.

== Literature ==
- Abbey Library St. Gallen, Cod. Sang. 484, Codex Sangallensis 484.
- Arlt, Wulf/Rankin, Susan: Codices 484 & 381. Band 1: Kommentar/Commentary, Winterthur 1996.
- Arlt, Wulf/Rankin, Susan: Codices 484 & 381. Band 2: Codex Sangallensis 484, Winterthur 1996.
- Hild, Elaine Stratton: Verse, Music, and Notation: Observations on Settings of Poetry in Sankt Gallen’s Ninth- and Tenth-Century Manuscripts, doctoral thesis, University of Colorado, Ann Arbor 2014.
- Hospenthal, Cristina: Tropen zum Ordinarium Missae in St. Gallen. Untersuchungen zu den Beständen in den Handschriften St. Gallen, Stiftsbibliothek 381, 484, 376, 378, 380 und 382, Bern 2010 (Publikationen der Schweizerischen Musikforschenden Gesellschaft 52).
- Rankin, Susan: Notker und Tuotilo: Schöpferische Gestalten in einer Neuen Zeit, in: Schweizer Jahrbuch für Musikwissenschaft 11, 1991, S. 17-42.
- von Scarpatetti, Beat Matthias: Die Handschriften der Stiftsbibliothek St. Gallen, Wiesbaden 2008 (Codices 450-546: Liturgica, Libri Precum, Deutsche Gebetsbücher, Spiritualia, Musikhandschriften 9.-16. Jahrhundert). Online: <http://www.e-codices.unifr.ch/de/description/csg/0484/>, Accessed: 02.04.2022.
