= Codex Sangallensis 381 =

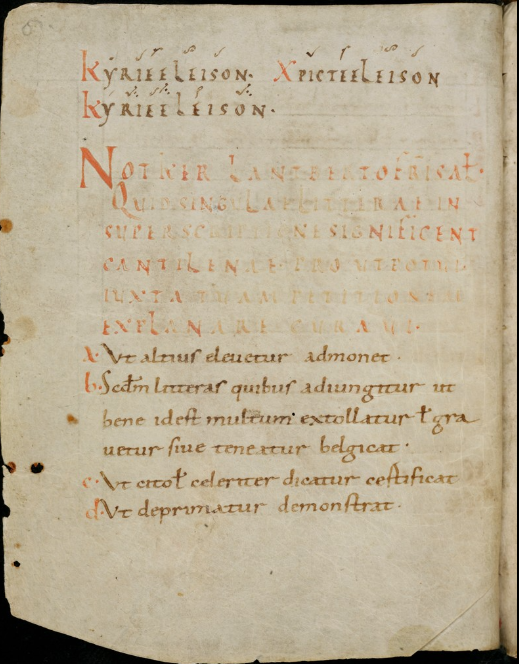
Codex Sangallensis 381: The title page of Notker's letter to Lantbert

Codex Sangallensis 381 (Signature Cod. Sang. 381) is an early medieval music manuscript, produced in the abbey of St. Gallen and stored in the Abbey Library in St. Gallen. The manuscript is known for its extensive collection of so-called tropes, verses, and sequences. Together with Cod. Sang. 484, this manuscript is an important contribution to one of the most extensive collections of such compositions in the East Frankish kingdom and thus plays an important role in the history of music.

== Description ==
With a surface area of just 14.5cm x 11.5cm, the manuscript is of a smaller format than most of its contemporaries. Its contents cover 500 pages, for which parchment was used as the writing material. Parchment consists mainly of goat, sheep or rarely calf skins. The manuscript was rebound in the 15th century and was restored in 1992. The binding consists of two beech plates with dark-brown leather over the spine. The copying and compilation of the manuscript is attributed to one main scribe and compiler of the 10th century, with additional scribes adding further material and making corrections until the 13th century.

== History ==
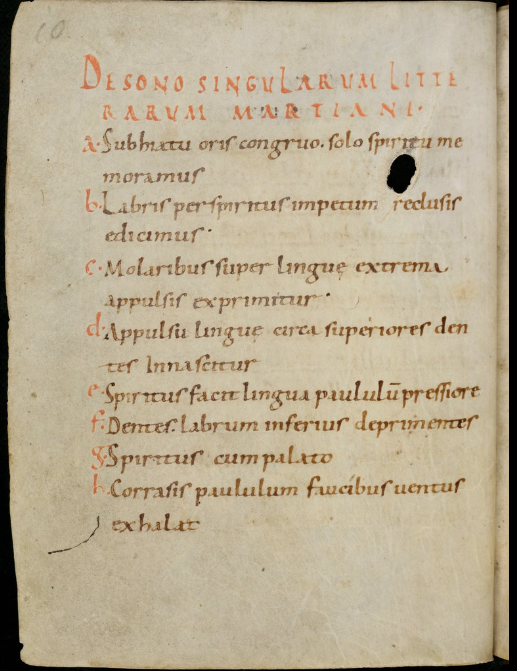
"On the sound of individual letters" by Martianus Capella. A fragment was copied in the Codex Sangallensis 381

The origins of the manuscript can be viewed as a part of a broader process of trope writing as well as the extension of originally Roman liturgy, which was not only shaped by the three influential figures Tuotilo, Notker and Ratpert at the abbey in St. Gallen, but also occurred in the larger context of the entire Frankish empire.

The initial composition of the manuscript by the main scribe is dated to the second quarter of the 10th century. Analyses of the scribe’s hand in the manuscript suggest that the main scribe was in fact a monk named Salomon, who was affiliated with the abbey of St. Gallen and who had previously compiled Cod. Sang. 484, an earlier troper, as well. This hypothesis is based on a charter dated at 926-928, which was signed with the name “Salomon” and whose scribal hand has been identified as the same as that featured in the codex. In the literature, some doubts remain regarding the actual name of the scribe, which is why most publications use the neutral term Σ (sigma). Both manuscripts can thus be interpreted as a part of a larger process of trope collection that took place in the abbey at the same time.

The fact that Cod. Sang. 484 is represented as a part of Cod. Sang. 381 in its entirety suggests an underlying copying process that is involved in the production of codices at the abbey. It is assumed that the scribe of Cod. Sang. 381 oriented his work with reference to his earlier creation and used Cod. Sang. 484 as a template for his second creation; whereas Cod. Sang. 484 is characterised by frequent erasures and rearrangements or insertions of material, Cod. Sang. 381 has many fewer corrections.

Not only the size but also the simple realisation of the codex suggest that it was intended for the use of a monastic cantor, whose role during the mass came close to that of a lead singer. Contained in the manuscript are chants that were created for specific occasions and were thus only sung once. Some chants, however, continued to be in use in liturgical practice until the 13th century. Furthermore, the entire inventory of Notker’s Liber Ymnorum, a book dedicated to the bishop Liutward of Vercelli and consisting of roughly 40 sequences, is also present in the manuscript.

== Structure ==
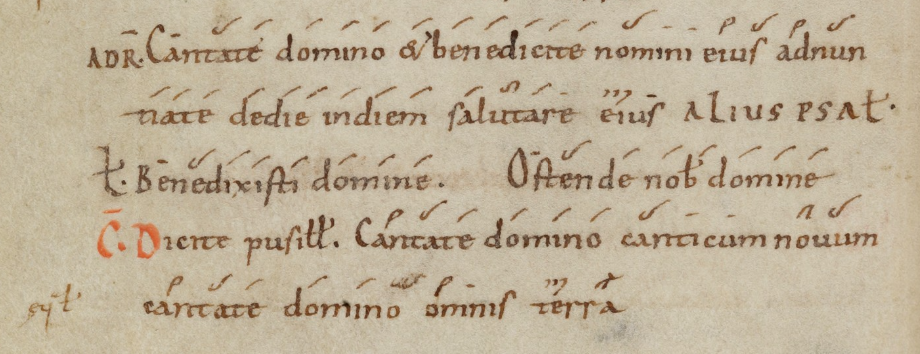
An example of neumatic notation in the Codex Sangallensis 381

The manuscript begins with a sequence, a litany (later additions), and lauds. Pages 6-9 contain a copy of the “Epistola Notkeri ad Lantbertum”—a letter of Notker to Lantbert—in which the meaning of the so-called significative letters is explained. More specifically, these significative letters were textual additions to the normal neumatic notation in the form of letters, which contained additional information regarding the performance of the melody—of its direction, expression and rhythm.

Pages 10-12 contain a fragment titled “De sono singularum litterarum martiani” (On the sound of singular letters of Martianus) taken from “De nuptiis Philologiae et Mercurii” by Martianus Capella. It describes techniques of articulation for the correct pronunciation of the letters of the Latin (and partially the Greek and German) alphabet. The remaining manuscript contains a collection of versus (metric processional hymns, tropes, and sequences in the following order:

=== Contents ===
Content	Page	Description
Ordinary chants with Greek text	13-22	Chants that make up the invariable part of the mass
Versus	23-50	Processional hymns in metre, mainly used during specific celebrations. A portion of the versus composed at the abbey is attributed to Ratpert
Introit and Communion Verses	50-141	Additional psalm chants for the proper tropes used during the opening of the mass (introit) as well as the communion (communio)
Versus	142-156	Additional processional hymns
Computus	167	Detailed instructions regarding the calculation of the date of Easter between the years 830 and 1008
Proper Tropes	195-294	Tropes of mass chants which vary depending on the ecclesiastical year or occasion. The arrangement and quantity of these tropes roughly corresponds to the inventory of proper tropes featured in Cod. Sang. 484. The creation of the tropes at the abbey St. Gallen are mainly attributed to Tuotilo
Ordinary Chants and Tropes	295-324	These chants were part of the invariable sections of the mass, with corresponding tropes. They also correspond to the ordinary chants collected in the Cod. Sang. 484.
Sequences	326-498	Chants sung between the Alleluia and the Gospel, part of the proper

== Reception ==
Particularly during the golden age of the abbey—during the time of Notker, Ratpert, and Tuotilo—St. Gallen was known for the ingenuity as well as the quality of the chants that were produced. Consequently, individual tropes spread quite widely across Europe: Tuotilo's trope “Hodie cantandus est” for the Introitus “Puer natus est”, for instance, can be found in over 100 European manuscripts, mostly concentrated in copies in German-speaking areas. Simultaneously, a not insignificant number of copies from southern France, the Alsace, and northern Italy have been recorded. Further tropes also appear in manuscripts in the same areas, but not to the same extent.

== Literature ==
- Abbey Library St. Gallen, Cod. Sang. 381, Codex Sangallensis 381.
- Arlt, Wulf/Ranking, Susan: Codices 484 & 381. Band 1: Kommentar/Commentary, Winterthur 1996.
- Arlt, Wulf/Ranking, Susan: Codices 484 & 381. Band 3: Codex Sangallensis 381, Winterthur 1996.
- Hild, Elaine Stratton: Verse, Music, and Notation: Observations on Settings of Poetry in Sankt Gallen’s Ninth- and Tenth-Century Manuscripts, doctoral thesis, University of Colorado, Ann Arbor 2014.
- Hospenthal, Cristina: Tropen zum Ordinarium Missae in St. Gallen. Untersuchungen zu den Beständen in den Handschriften St. Gallen, Stiftsbibliothek 381, 484, 376, 378, 380 und 382, Bern 2010 (Publikationen der Schweizerischen Musikforschenden Gesellschaft 52).
- Rankin, Susan: Notker und Tuotilo: Schöpferische Gestalten in einer Neuen Zeit, in: Schweizer Jahrbuch für Musikwissenschaft 11, 1991, S. 17-42.
- Scherrer, Gustav: Verzeichniss der Handschriften der Stiftsbibliothek von St. Gallen, Halle 1875. Online: <http://www.e-codices.unifr.ch/de/description/csg/0381/>, Accessed: 02.04.2022.
