= Grimald of Weissenburg =

Grimald, Latinised Grimaldus (born around 800; died 13 June 872 in Saint Gall), was abbot of Weissenburg Abbey (around 825–839 and 847–872), abbot of the Abbey of Saint Gall (841–872), arch-chaplain of the East Frankish king Louis the German (848–870) and chancellor (833–838/40, 854–870). He was one of the founders of scholarly education in the East Franconian Empire and in St. Gall.

A copy of the late Roman Notitia Galliarum from the Grimalt Codex made for Grimald at Saint Gall

== Life ==
Grimald derived from a noble Rhine Franconian family. His uncle Hetto and his brother Theotgaud were successively the Archbishops of Trier. Still under the regency of Charlemagne, Grimald came to the court scriptorium (dt. "Hofschule") for his education. He is said to have been a pupil of Alcuin, which is, however, unlikely as Alcuin already died in 804. Grimald received his higher education at the Abbey of Reichenau under Abbot Haito (806–823) and Abbot Erlebald (823–838).

From 824, Grimald was chaplain in the imperial chapel at the court of Louis the Pious. In 833 at the latest, Grimald received Weissenburg Abbey in Speiergau and had St. Peter's church rebuilt which had been destroyed in a fire.

On 19 October 833, Grimald was for the first time mentioned as head of the imperial chancellery. He held this office (with an interruption from 838/40-854) until his withdrawal due to old age in 870. There is evidence that the poet-monk Otfrid of Weissenburg was one of the two scribes who spent time at the court of Louis the German when Grimald was chancellor. In the course of the battles within the dynasty of the Carolingians, Grimald was dismissed as Abbot of Weißenburg in 839, but was appointed Abbot of the Abbey of Saint Gall by Louis the German after the battle of Fontenoy in 841 and also retrieved the office of Abbot at Weissenburg Abbey in 847. He held the office at the Abbey of Saint Gall until his death.

He furthermore presided over a third monastery (possibly Ellwangen Abbey or Niederaltaich Abbey). In the course of his career, Grimald became an important confidant at the court of Louis the German. Besides his work as chancellor, he was additionally appointed as arch-chaplain in 848. Grimald's repeated activity as missus dominicus attests to his political influence.

Grimald had a significant share in the cultural and economical boom of the Abbey of Saint Gall in the ninth century. He generated a busy construction activity and transformed the library into a centre of sophisticated education in the eastern Frankish empire. His contemporaries already deemed Grimald an outstanding personage. Several well-known ninth century authors comment approvingly on the Abbot's scholarliness. Ratpert, a Saint Gall historian, dedicated an epigram to him and Walafrid Strabo even lauded Grimald's poetry, of which nothing has been preserved however. Walafrid dedicated the Liber de visionibus Wettini and the Liber de cultura hortorum to Grimald. An index of Grimald's "private library" has been bequeathed which is still to a large part kept in the abbey library of Saint Gall.

In the year 870, Grimald abdicated his political offices (but not his abbacy) due to old age and withdrew to Saint Gall where he died on 13 June 872. A strong and winning personality, Grimald united in himself the gifts of the courtier and the prince of the church, who won the favour of his king as well as the affectionate gratitude of his monasteries. Despite his lifelong status as a secular priest, he was highly esteemed among the monks. Dean Hartmut, who had during Grimald's frequent absence already been acting as his representative, eventually became the new abbot.

== Sources ==
- Von Ellwangen, Ermenrich: Epistola ad Grimaldum abbatem. in: Ernst Dümmler (ed.): MGH Epp. 5. Berlin 1899, p. 534–580.
- Balbulus, Notker: Taten Kaiser Karls des Großen (Gesta Karoli Magni). in: Hans F. Haefele (ed.): MGH SS rer. Germ. N.S. 12. Berlin 1959.
- Ratpert von St. Gallen: St. Galler Klostergeschichten (Casus sancti Galli). in: Hannes Steiner (ed.): MGH SS rer. Germ. 75. Hannover 2002.
- Strabo, Walahfrid: Ad Grimaldum capellanum de morte Wettini. in: ed. Ernst Dümmler (ed.): MGH Poetae 2. Berlin 1884, p. 334.

== Reading list ==
- Bischoff, Bernhard: Bücher am Hofe Ludwigs des Deutschen und die Privatbibliothek des Kanzlers Grimalt. in: Bernhard Bischoff (ed.): Mittelalterliche Studien. Ausgewählte Aufsätze zur Schriftkunde und Literaturgeschichte, Vol 3. Stuttgart 1981, p. 187–212.
- Duft, Johannes : Die Äbte Gozbert, Grimalt, Hartmut, Salomo (816–920). Große Äbte – blühende Abtei. in: Peter Ochsenbein, and Ernst Ziegler (eds.): Die Abtei St. Gallen, Vol 2: Beiträge zur Kenntnis ihrer Persönlichkeiten. Ausgewählte Aufsätze in überarbeiteter Fassung von Johannes Duft. Sigmaringen 1991, p. 61–72.
- Fleckenstein, Josef: Grimald. in: Neue Deutsche Biographie (NDB), Vol 7. Duncker & Humblot, Berlin 1966, p. 75.
- Geuenich, Dieter: Beobachtungen zu Grimald von St. Gallen, Erzkaplan und Oberkanzler Ludwigs des Deutschen. in: Michael Borgolte, and Herrad Spilling (eds.): Litterae medii aevi. Festschrift für Johanne Autenrieth zu ihrem 65. Geburtstag. Thorbecke, Sigmaringen 1988, p. 55–68.
- Kehr, Paul Fridolin: Die Kanzlei Ludwigs des Deutschen. in: Abhandlungen der Preußischen Akademie der Wissenschaften. Jahrgang 1932. Berlin 1933.
- Meyer von Knonau, Gerold: Grimald. in: Allgemeine Deutsche Biographie (ADB), Vol 9. Duncker & Humblot, Leipzig 1879, p. 701-3.
- Zotz, Thomas: Grimald, Abt von Weißenburg. in: Lexikon des Mittelalters (LexMA), Vol 4. Artemis & Winkler, München/Zürich 1989, p. 1713-14.
