= St. Gall Priscian Glosses =

The St. Gall Priscian Glosses (Codex Sangallensis 904), abbreviated Sg., is an Irish manuscript of the Latin grammar Institutiones grammaticae by Priscian, held by the Abbey Library of St. Gall. It contains 9412 glosses, including 3478 in Old Irish. Together with the Würzburg glosses on the Epistles of St Paul and the Milan glosses on a Commentary on the Psalms they provide the main source of Old Irish writing available today and thus serve as an important reference for linguistic research on Old Irish.

== Origin of manuscript ==
The original Institutiones Grammaticae was written by Priscian between 526 and 527, and was subsequently used in Ireland to teach Latin grammar. Cod. Sang. 904 is one of four complete surviving manuscripts.

It is thought to have been written around 845 ad. in Ireland, possibly in either Nendrum or Bangor, the original home of St. Gall.

The manuscript was written by two scribes, as suggested by the second scribe's note at the beginning of his part in the text. In addition, three minor scribes added corrections. According to a note on page 89, the manuscript was copied off two models.

== Contents and description ==
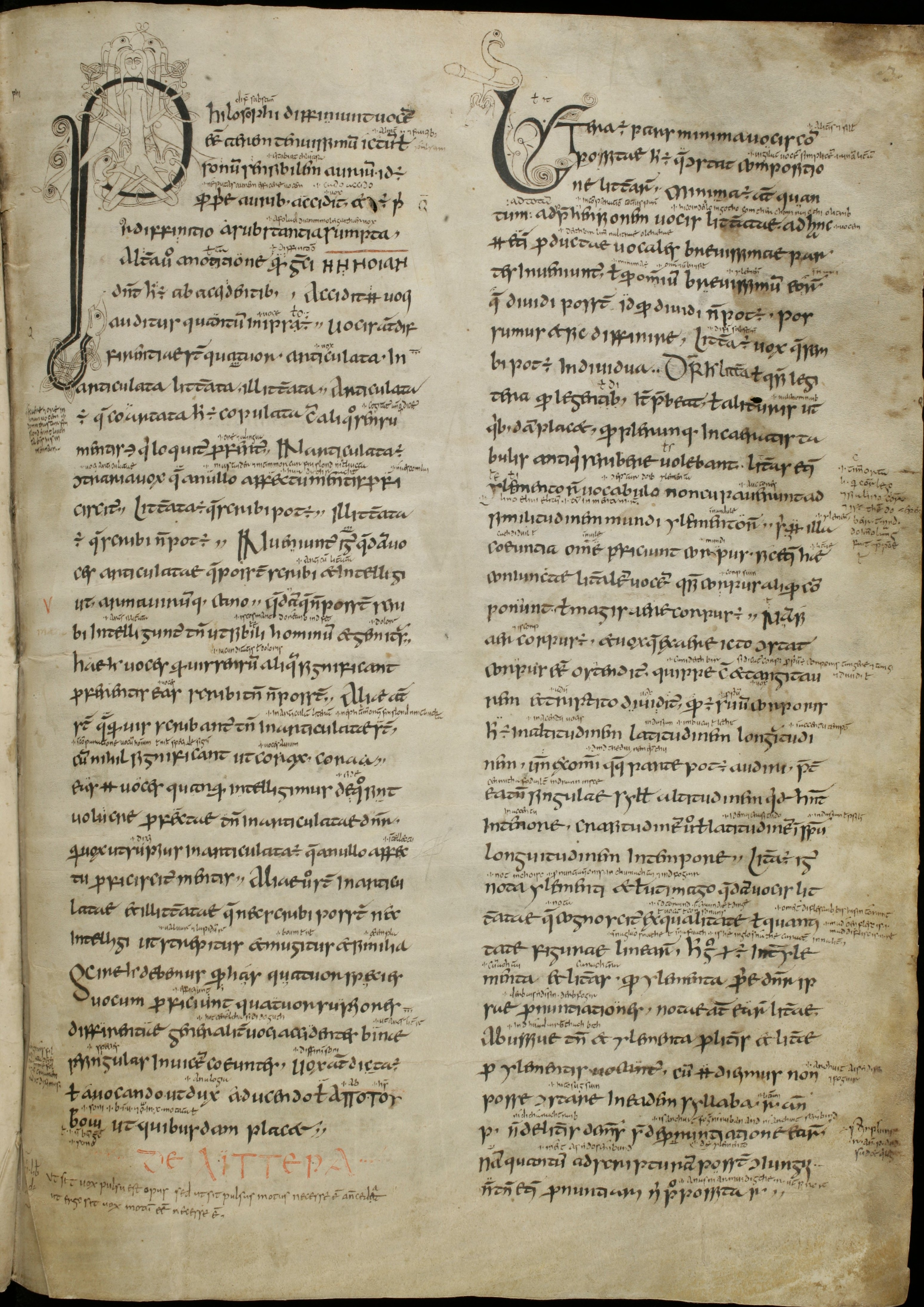
The beginning of Cod. Sang. 904

Cod. Sang. 904 contains 249 pages, but the pagination jumps from page 78 to page 88, reducing the actual number of pages to 240. It is written on thick parchment, possibly vellum, and there are a number of patched holes and grease stains. The pages are divided into two columns of 42 lines each. The ink used is dark brown and black. The initials of books and chapters are decorated with flora and fauna elements in the typical Irish style.

Cod. Sang. 904 includes the first 16 Books of Priscian and part of Book 17 until GL 3, 147, 18 "naturaliter". Apart from a caesura at the end of the fifth quire, the text is written continuously. It is written in Insular script.

== Glosses ==
Cod. Sang. 904 is known for its numerous glosses in Latin and Old Irish. It also contains eight entries in Ogham writing and so comprises the oldest source of Ogham writing in a manuscript.

The first three glosses on pages 50, 70, and 170 respectively, are indicators of the dates of writing. The following four entries on pages 193-196 indicate that corrections were made.

The last gloss on page 204 offers a more personal note from the scribe, the Old Irish word latheirt. Damian McManus presents the translation in "A Guide to Ogham": "This [definition] together with other contexts shows the basic meaning to be 'excessive ale-consumption' with the logical extensions 'excessive drunkenness' and 'massive hangover', the last probably the meaning intended in the Priscian Oghams."

Among the most valuable and interesting glosses are the only recorded instances of two Old Irish poems. The first is the anonymous 9th century poem Is acher in gaíth in-nocht. The second is on page 203 of the manuscript and reads as follows:

(m.i.) Domfarcai fidbaidae fál. fomchain lóid luin lúad nad cél. huas mo lebrán indlínech. fomchain trírech innaṅén .., Fommchain cói menn medair mass. hiṁbrot glass de dindgnaib doss. debrath nomchoimmdiu cóima. cáinscríbaimm foróida r<oss>. "A hedge of trees surrounds me: a blackbird’s lay sings to me—praise which I will not hide— above my booklet the lined one the trilling of the birds sings to me. In a gray mantle the cuckoo’s beautiful chant sings to me from the tops of bushes: may the Lord be kind to me! I write well under the greenwood."

== See also ==
- Codex Sangallensis (disambiguation)
- Priscian
- Irish Poetry
- Is acher in gaith in-nocht
