= Purchart =

Purchart is a Germanic masculine given name and a variant of Burchard. Notable people with the name include:

- Purchart I (c.920/930–975), abbot of Saint Gall
- Purchart II (died 1022), abbot of Saint Gall
