= Evangelium Longum =

Illuminated manuscript made in the Abbey of Saint Gail in Switzerland

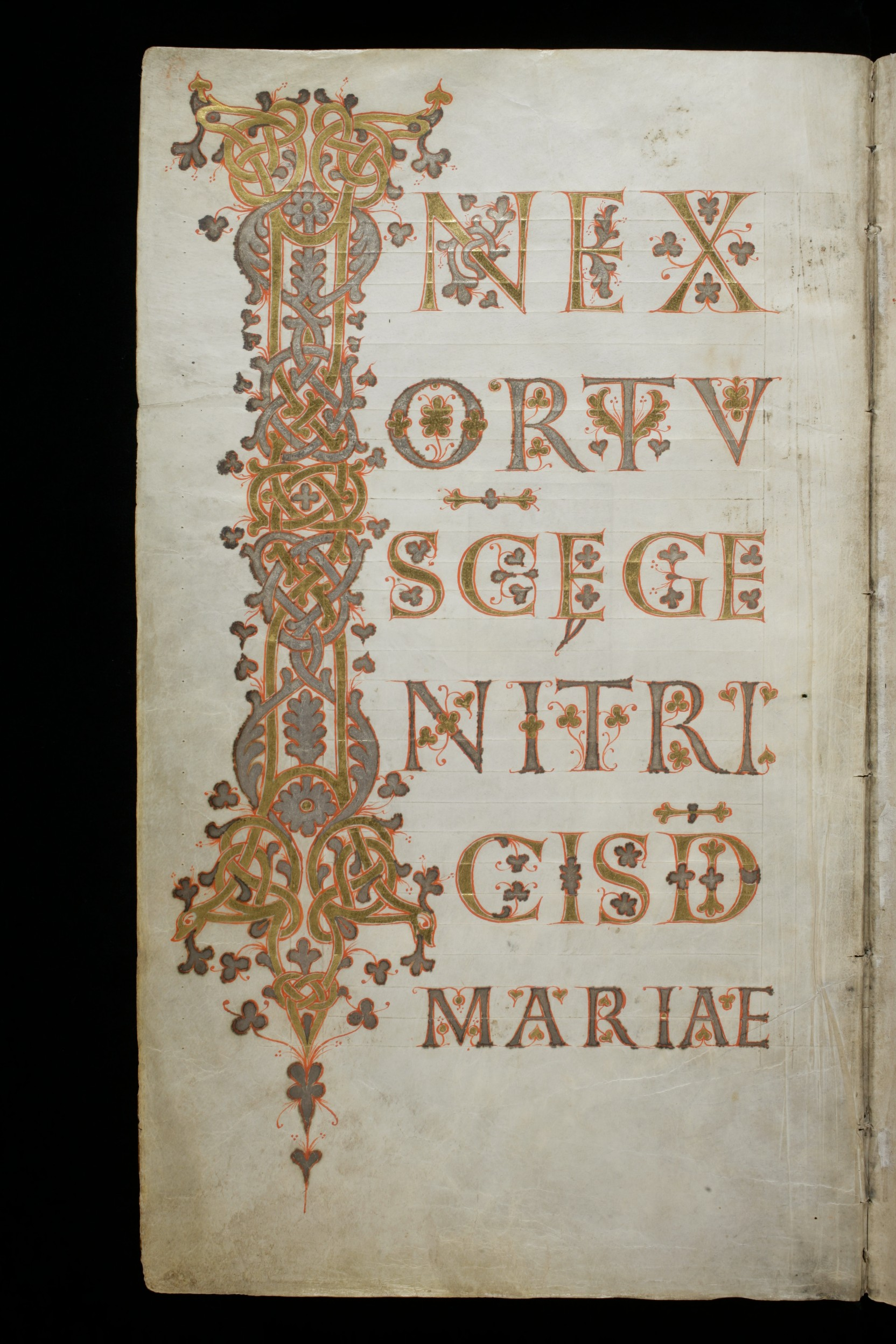
Page 6 of the Evangelium longum

The Evangelium longum is an illuminated manuscript Latin evangeliary that was made around 894 at the Abbey of Saint Gall in Switzerland. It consists of texts drawn from the Gospels for the use of the preacher during Mass.

The scribe was the monk Sintram. The treasure binding, a cover with carved ivory plaques and metal fittings, was made by the monk Tuotilo. The book measures 398 x 235 mm.

Today, the original evangeliary is located in the abbey library of Saint Gall and can be found in the Codex Sangallensis under Cod. 53. It belongs to the permanent exhibition of the abbey library. It is available online as part of the “e-codices”-project of the University of Fribourg.

== History ==
The Evangelium longum is arguably the best documented book of the Middle Ages. Not only are the patron and the artists that were involved in its creation known by name, but also the year of production of the manuscript can be exactly determined. During a dendrochronological investigation, the date when a tree was felled is calculated by means of its growth rings. Such an examination was conducted on the wooden parts of the book cover in the 1970s. Dating to the year 894 is confirmed by a tale about the origin of the Evangelium longum that was written around 1050 and belongs to the Casus Sancti Galli by Ekkehard IV.

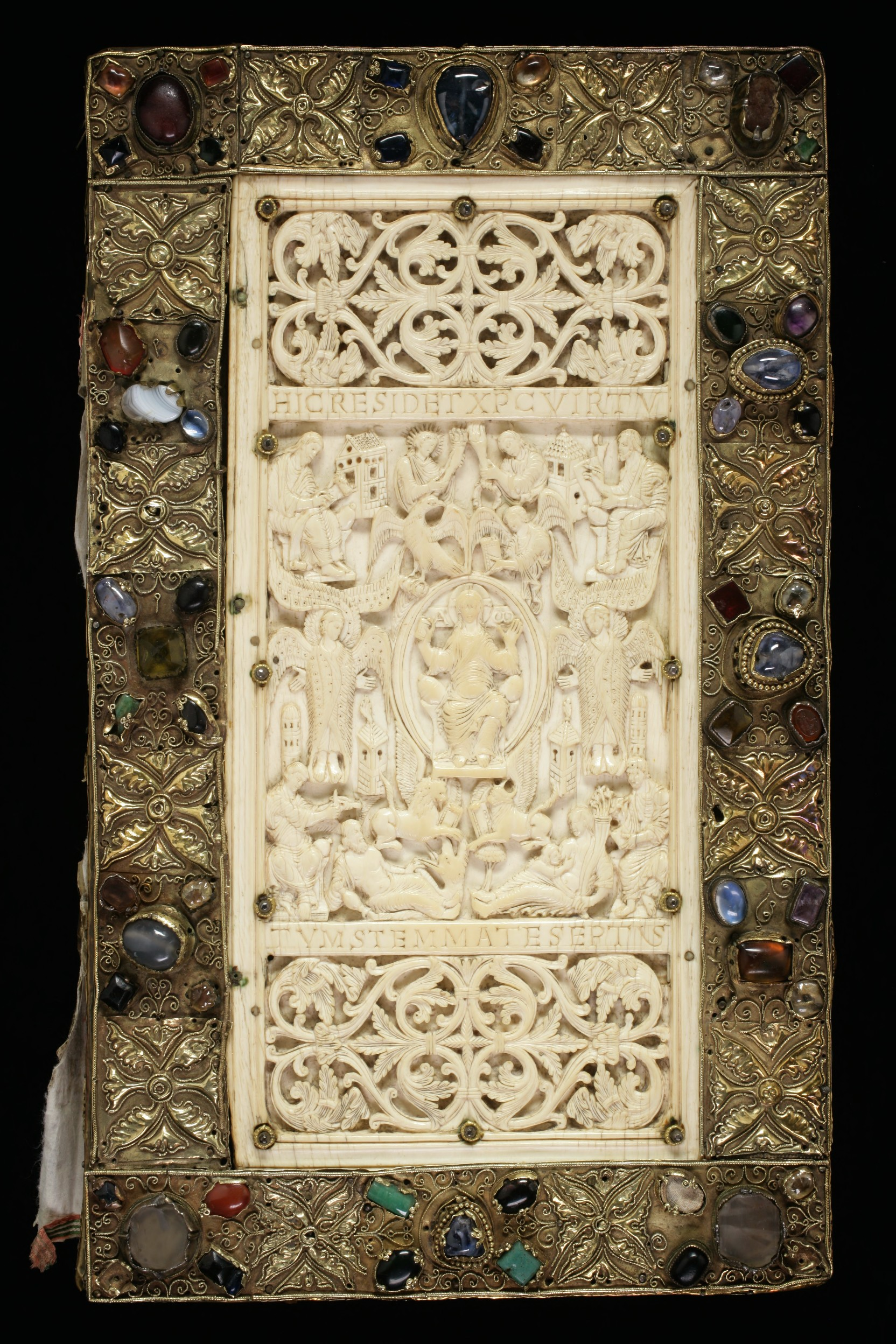
Front of the cover of the Evangelium longum

The story of the manuscript begins with the ivory plaques measuring over 500 cm^{2} that were incorporated into the book cover. In the Casus Sancti Galli, Ekkehard comments on these plates as follows: "These were, however, former wax tablets to write on, like the ones that Charlemagne, according to his biographer, usually placed beside his bed when he went to sleep". These plates, which were formerly used by Charlemagne as writing pads, were probably bequeathed by the Emperor to the archbishopric of Mainz and thence came into the possession of Hatto, at that time Archbishop of Mainz (891–913). When Hatto had to accompany King Arnulf (850-899) to Italy, he asked his friend, Abbot Salomo of Saint Gall (890-920), to keep his treasure save during his absence. However, instead of guarding it as promised, Salomo III soon spread a rumour about Hatto’s death and took possession of his treasure. Whereas he donated most of it to the poor and gifted another part to the Minster of Constance, he also incorporated part of the treasure, for instance the two ivory plates, into the Saint Gall monastery treasure. Then he commissioned his most talented artist, the monk Tuotilo († 913) with the adornment of the plates and the monk Sintram, who was known to be a talented penman, to write an evangeliary.

As Johannes Duft and Rudolf Schnyder explain, for a long time it was falsely believed that Tuotilo had only ornamented one of the two plates, as Ekkehard writes in his report that "one of these [ivory plates] was delightfully adorned with imagery; the other was of most delicate smoothness, and precisely that one Salomo gave Tuotilo to carve". Examinations with regard to the age of the carvings revealed, however, that they derive from the same time and the same hand, namely that of Tuotilo.

The Evangelium longum, whose name is derived from its extraordinary oblong format, was supposed to serve as a showpiece evangeliary (dt. “Prachtevangelistar”) for important events such as the major church festivals or the arrival of guests of high-rank. Interestingly, the pericopes that form the content of the book, were created for the cover, not vice versa.

== Description ==
=== Cover ===
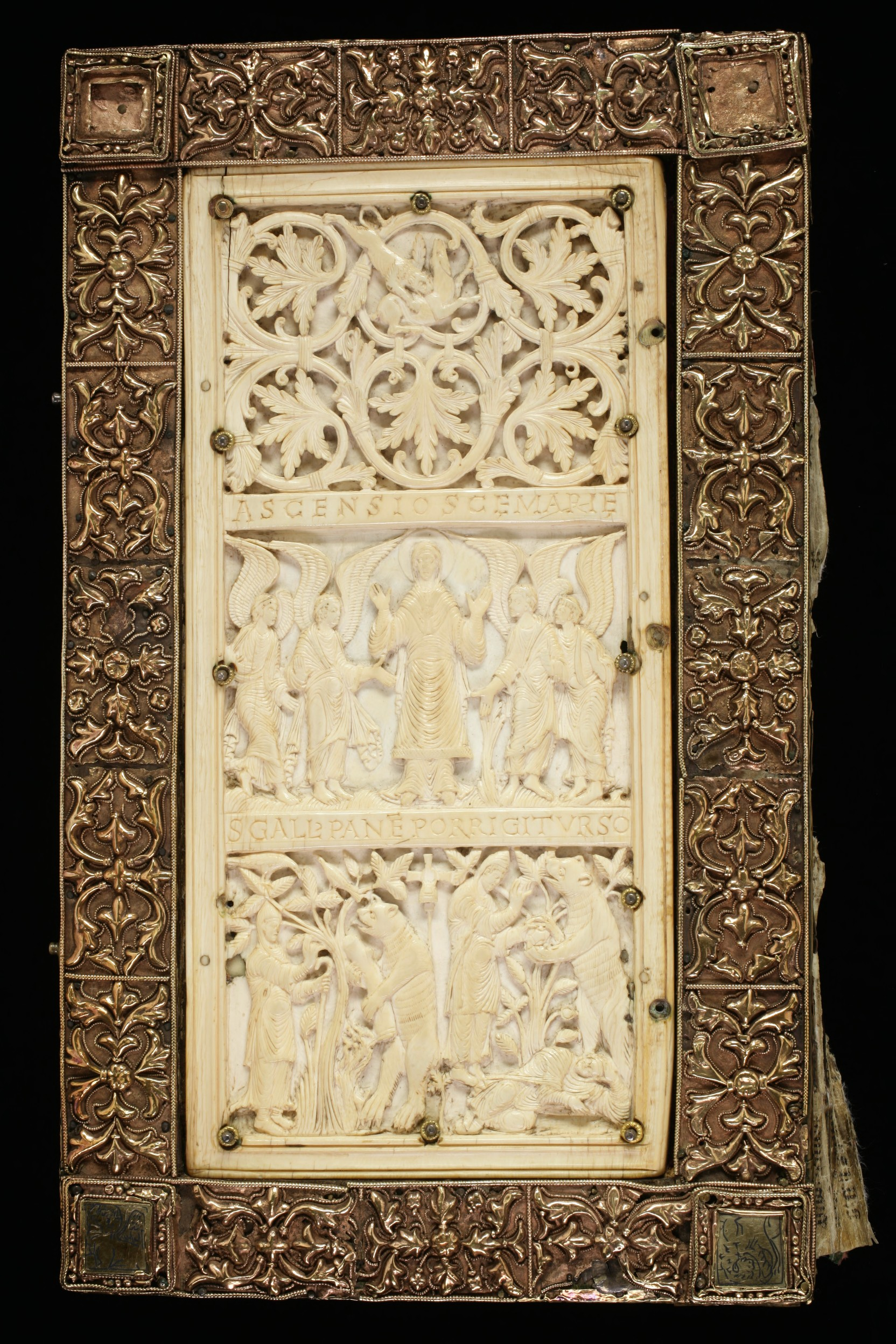
Back of the cover of the Evangelium longum

The crucial element of the Evangelium longum’s cover are the two ivory plaques that were carved by Tuotilo. Now as then, their size is considered extraordinary. Ekkehard writes that the plaques are of a dimension, "as if the elephant furnished with such teeth had been a giant compared to his conspecifics". Pieces of bone were used in order to mend holes in the ivory.

The front plaque of the Evangelium longum (320 x 155 mm, 9 to 12 mm thick) has Christ in Majesty in the middle; Christ is depicted in the Mandorla (almond-shaped halo), holding the Book of Life in his right hand. An alpha and an omega are engraved on both sides of his head. Moreover, Christ is flanked by two Seraphs as well as lighthouses with torches. In the corners of the frame, the evangelists (John, Matthew, Mark and Lucas) are depicted, while their symbols (eagle, winged man, lion and bull) are situated directly around Christ. According to Anton von Euw, the four evangelists represent the "Quadriga Virtutum" from Alcuin’s Doctrine of Virtue on whom man is supposed to soar up to the throne of heaven. Finally, the sun and the moon, personified by Sol and Luna, are depicted at the upper border of the image, while at the bottom, the ocean and the earth are represented by Oceanus and Tellus mater. The narrative picture field in the middle of the plate is framed by ornamental parts above and below that are separated by two bars. The bars bear the following inscription: HIC RESIDET XPC VIRTVTVM STEMMATE SEPTVS (Here Christ sits enthroned, surrounded by the wreath of virtues).

The back plaque (320 x 154 mm, 9 to 10 mm thick), also called “Gall plate”, depicts the Assumption of Mary and the story of Gall and the bear, the most familiar part of Saint Gall’s founding myth. At the top, the back plate also exhibits an ornamental part and the three parts are again divided by bars. The inscription on the upper bar says ASCENSIO S[AN]C[TA]E MARI[A]E ("The Assumption of the holy Mary"), whereas the inscription on the lower bar reads S[ANCTVS] GALL[VS] PANE[M] PORRIGIT URSO (Saint Gallus hands some bread to the bear).

The two ivory plaques are placed in an oak wood frame, which is mounted with fittings made of precious metal. The creation of this frame, embellished with gold and jewels from Bishop Hatto’s treasure, can also be ascribed to the monk Tuotilo. According to new research, the metal on the front plate was replaced in the 10th century. This fact could be connected to an episode reported in Ekkehard’s Casus Sancti Galli in Chapter 74 which says that in the year 954, at the reception of Abbot Craloh at the abbey, a monk did not want to present the Evangelium longum to his abbot to kiss. Instead he threw it towards him, whereby it fell to the ground and the front side was damaged.

=== Text ===
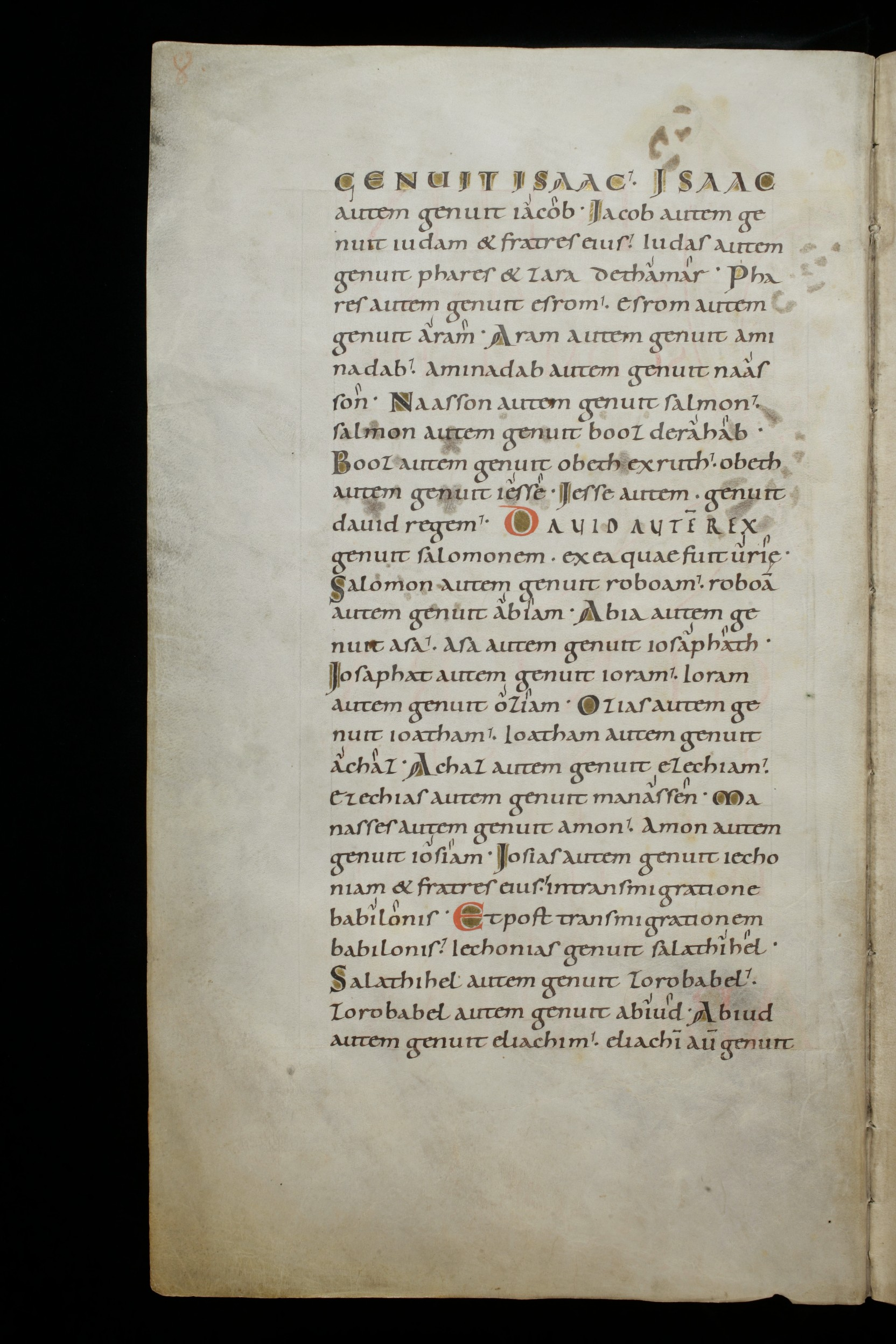
Text page of the Evangelium longum (p. 8) with golden capitals at the beginning of every sentence

The text of the Evangelium longum was written by the monk Sintram, of whom Ekkehard says that "his fingers were admired by all the world" and that his "elegant writing’s consistency is captivating". Johannes Duft and Rudolf Schnyder likewise comment on the "admirably uniform, astonishingly steady and even hand". The pages were carefully ruled with a stylus and inscribed with the so-called Hartmut minuscule that was typically used in Saint Gall in the 9th century. Abbot Hartmut (872-883) himself developed this late Carolingian minuscule in and for Saint Gall. Every sentence in the Evangelium longum begins with a golden painted capital letter resulting in a total of twenty to thirty of these capitals per page. On some pages there are moreover golden initials, two of which, namely the "L" and "C" on pages 7 and 11, according to Ekkehard, were painted and gilded by Abbot Salomo himself. However, on closer examination, the initials were evidently created by the same hand as the rest of the manuscript, namely by Sintram’s. As Anton von Euw remarks, Ekkehard’s comment thus has to be interpreted as an empty phrase of praise (dt. “Ruhmesfloskel”) for the benefit of Abbot Salomo.

When including the two mirror blades attached to the front and back book cover as well as the two endpapers, the Evangelium longum consists of 154 parchment sheets. Beginning at the first endpaper, the sheets were paginated by the abbey librarian Ildefons von Arx with Arabic numbers (1-304) in red ink. The average size of a page is 395 x 230 mm, the written space measures 275 x 145/165 mm and each written page consists of 29 lines.

== Content ==
The Evangelium longum contains the gospel-pericopes which were supposed to be sung by the deacon during mass. Pages 6 and 7 are adorned with two magnificent initials: While page 6 exhibits the golden and silver painted initial "I" and the capitals IN EXPORTV S[AN]C[TA]E GENITRICIS D[EI] MARIAE, page 7 is inscribed with the bright golden capitals INITIV[M] S[AN]C[T]I EUANG[ELII] SE[CVN]D[V]M MATHEV[M] und LIBER GENERATIONIS IHV XPI.

From pages 6 to 10, the Evangelium longum recounts the first chapter of the Gospel of Matthew, including Jesus’s lineage and his birth from the Virgin Mary. Page 10, which displays the initials "I" and "C" as well as the capitals INCIPIVNT LECTIONES EVANGELIOR[VM] PER ANNI CIRCVLVM LEGENDAE, commences a new part of the text: pages 11 to 233 contain the pericopes taken from the gospels which are used for the so-called Temporale, i.e. for the feasts of the Lord as well as for all the Sundays, including Wednesday and Friday, of the church year. A short appendix furthermore entails pericopes for Trinity Sunday and the votive masses from Monday to Saturday.

On page 234, the second part of the Evangelium longum begins with the inscription INCIPIVNT LECTIONES EVANGELIOR[VM] DE SINGVLIS FESTIVITATIBVS S[AN]C[T]ORVM. Pages 234 to 290 thus consist of the so-called Sanctorale, meaning the pericopes for the feasts of the saints of the church year.

== Subsequent history and relevance of the manuscript ==
Nowadays, the interior of the manuscript is still in surprisingly good condition, which indicates, according to Anton von Euw, that it was never or only rarely been opened. In contrast, Duft and Schnyder remark that the cover of the Evangelium longum has experienced at least two restorations. Before 1461, the bindings of the book block were restored, the book spine replaced and the golden applications on the front plate repaired. Probably in the 18th century, another restoration was conducted, in the course of which the book spine as well as the front gold lining were again renovated.

Several factors distinguish the oblong evangeliary that is being kept in Saint Gall. Firstly, the Evangelium longum was definitely produced not only as another book, but as a showpiece evangeliary. Thus, Ekkehard writes that it is a one of a kind evangeliary, "of which in our opinion there will not be another one".

The material value left aside, the Evangelium longum is moreover one of the manuscripts whose development history is the most closely documented (from before 900 until today), which makes it a work of the highest documentary value.

Finally, the Evangelium longum symbolises, according to David Ganz, the connection of Saint Gall’s monastery chronicle to the court of Charlemagne as well as the then close bond between the abbey and the Archbishopric of Mainz.

== Reading list ==
- Duft, Johannes und Rudolf Schnyder: Die Elfenbein-Einbände der Stiftsbibliothek St. Gallen. Beuroner Kunstverlag, Beuron 1984.
- Ganz, David: Buchgewänder: Prachteinbände im Mittelalter. Reimer, Berlin 2015.
- Schmuki, Karl, Peter Ochsenbein und Cornel Dora: Hundert Kostbarkeiten aus der Stiftsbibliothek St. Gallen. Verlag am Klosterhof, St. Gallen 1998.
- Von Euw, Anton: Die St. Galler Buchkunst vom 8. bis zum Ende des 11. Jahrhunderts. Verlag am Klosterhof, St. Gallen 2008.
