= Purchart II =

Purchart (died 17 July 1022) was abbot of the Abbey of Saint Gall from 1001 to 1022.

== Life ==
Purchart enjoyed great devotion among his monks. Thus, several stories are told about him, for example the one that in his youth, he went with Ekkehart II to Hedwig, the Countess of Swabia, at Castle Hohentwiel. He is supposed to have amused her with his self-composed verses, whereupon she gave him lessons in Greek. However, from the time before his election as abbot, documentary validation of his career is lacking; not even the book of vows gives any indication. Henry II affirmed the immunity of the abbey and the free election of abbots on 17 June 1004. Purchart's term of office ended when he died of an epidemic that befell Henry II's army on the return from his campaign of Italy.

== Works ==
Purchart is said to have countermanded the corruption of the Abbey of Saint Gall after Kerhart's reign. He restored the abbey breed and brought a lot of lost property, especially issued fief, back to the abbey. Moreover, he had the convent buildings repaired and enlarged, increased the church treasure and probably equipped the cloister with images from the life of Saint Gall and inscriptions written by Ekkehard IV. Under Purchart, the German language was especially cultivated, as Notker Labeo was at that time head of the convent school of Saint Gall.

Purchart successfully resisted legal and financial claims of the Bishopric of Constance and the archpriests in particular.
