= Codex Sangallensis 902 =

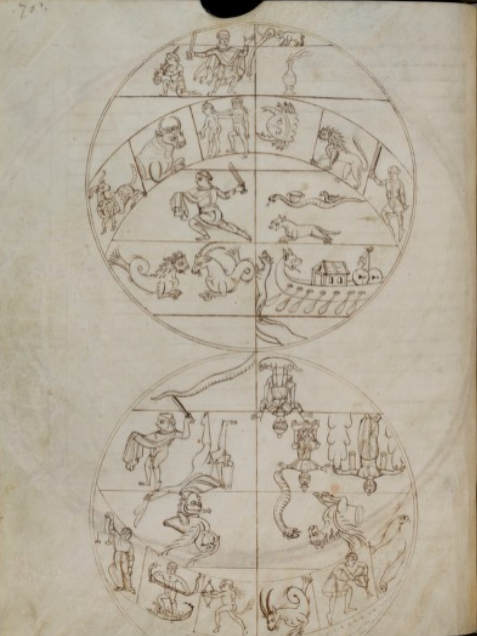
A celestial globe as the North and South axis, with zodiac signs

The Codex Sangallensis 902 is a 186-page long manuscript written mid-9th century at the Abbey Library in St. Gallen, where it is still housed today. The pages are made of parchment, with a height of 32 cm and a width of 25 cm. The text was written in Carolingian minuscule and is typically split into two columns, with 35 lines per column. However, the text is structured in a single column in pages 153 through 179. Titles were written in rustic capitals, whilst chapter initials are in upper case. The illustrations were made by quill in a dark-brown ink, and they often go across their respective columns.

The manuscript is a compilation of five separate parts written by different scribes. The writing styles of the manuscript's components indicate that parts II, III, and IV were formed in the early 9th century, and are thus the oldest sections of the codex.

== Historical Background ==
The main text of the Codex Sangallensis 902 is the Recensio Interpolata, a Latin translation of the Greek didactic poem Phainomena by Aratus. Phainomena is translated as "Appearances", and is concerned with astronomical and meteorological phenomena. Due to its popularity at the time, a multitude of Latin translations were created, one of which was the Aratus Latinus. The Aratus Latinus was written sometime in the early 8th century.

The Recensio Interpolata then emerged in the late 8th century as a revision of the Aratus Latinus. In contrast to the Aratus Latinus, which only consists of the text, the Recensio contains illustrations to accompany it. Furthermore, the text itself was also reworked, with certain philosophical and astrological passages being replaced by astronomical excerpts to make it more uniform and intelligible.

The Codex Sangallensis 902 was most likely based on a copy of the Recensio from West Francia, which would have arrived in St. Gallen sometime during the 9th century.

Additionally, after its completion, the Codex Sangallensis 902 came to be the source text of the Codex Sangallensis 250, a manuscript which was written towards the end of the 9th century, also at the Abbey Library in St. Gallen.

== Content ==
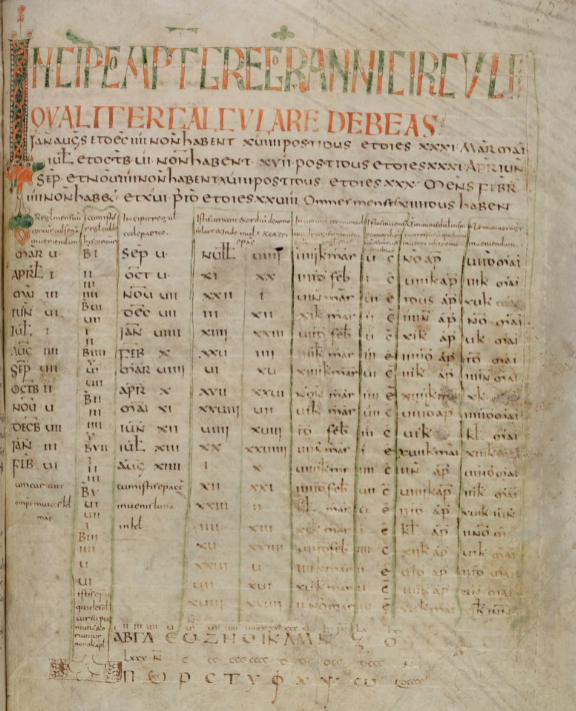
A greek Computus

Part I of the Codex Sangallensis 902 consists of the Ars grammatica by the Greek grammarian Dositheus. It was compiled in the 4th century with the aim of teaching Greeks Latin. The Recensio Interpolata then constitutes the second part of the Codex. It encompasses 35 pages with 45 illustrations accompanying the Latin text. The illustrations are of elements such as the astrological signs or the planets. There are also some drawings of celestial globes. The third section of the manuscript contains the liber de computo by Rabanus Maurus, whilst the fourth part contains a Greek Computus . Finally, the fifth segment of the Cod. Sang. 902, which is only five pages long, consists of a series of Cycli decemnovenales (cycles of 9 years).

Even though the Codex Sangallensis 902's version of the Recensio Interpolata constituted the basis of the Codex Sangallensis 250, there are still differences between some of their illustrations, which suggests that the scribes of the Cod. Sang. 250 also consulted another source. Additionally, the illustrations in the Codex 250 were drawn in a more meticulous and detailed manner, indicating that the scribes were more artistically skilled than those of the Codex 902. Furthermore, the scribes of the Cod. Sang. 902 occasionally made mistakes in their drawings, leading to incorrect illustrations or pictures that are out of perspective. This suggests that the manuscript which the 902 was copied from was formatted in a single column, leading to issues when the scribes of the Cod. Sang. 902 converted it to a two-column text.

== Bibliography ==
- Chlench-Priber, Kathrin (2023). "Astronomie im Mittelalter [Astronomy in the Middle Ages]". In Dora, Cornel (ed.). Sterne - Das Firmament in St. Galler Handschriften [Stars - The Firmament in St. Gallen Manuscripts] (in German) (1 ed.). Basel: Schwabe Verlag. pp. 10–25. ISBN 978-3-7965-4815-4.
- Haffner, Mechthild (1997). Ein antiker Sternbilderzyklus und seine Tradierung in Handschriften vom frühen Mittelalter bis zum Humanismus: Untersuchungen zu den Illustrationen der "Aratea" des Germanicus [An Ancient Constellation Cycle and its Transmission in Manuscripts from the Early Middle Ages up to Humanism: Studies on the Illustrations of the "Aratea" by Germanicus]. Studien zur Kunstgeschichte (in German). Vol. 114. Hildesheim: Georg Olms Verlag. pp. 21–29. ISBN 3-487-10407-5.
- Mütherich, Florentine (1989). "Die Bilder: Einleitung [The Pictures: Introduction]". In Bischoff, Bernhard; Eastwood, Bruce; Klein, Thomas A.-P.; Mütherich, Florentine; Obbema, Pieter F. J. (eds.). Aratea: Aratus des Germanicus [Aratea: Commentary on the Aratus Germanicus] (in German). Lucerne: Faksimile-Verlag. pp. 31–36. ISBN 3-85672-027-8.
- Obbema, Pieter F. J. (1989). "Die Handschrift: Einleitung [The Manuscript: Introduction]". In Bischoff, Bernhard; Eastwood, Bruce; Klein, Thomas A.-P.; Mütherich, Florentine; Obbema, Pieter F. J. (eds.). Aratea: Kommentar zum Aratus des Germanicus [Aratea: Commentary on the Aratus Germanicus] (in German). Lucerne: Faksimile-Verlag. pp. 9–10. ISBN 3-85672-027-8.
- Stückelberger, Alfred (2011). "Wissenstransfer in der Bildtradition mittelalterlicher Handschriften [Knowledge Transfer in the Pictorial Tradition of Medieval Manuscripts]". In Krause, Karin; Schellewald, Barbara (eds.). Bild und Text im Mittelalter [Sensus: Studies in Medieval Art]. Sensus: Studien zur mittelalterlichen Kunst (in German). Vol. 2. Cologne: Böhlau Verlag. pp. 329–346. ISBN 3-41220-642-3.
- Von Euw, Anton (2005). "Astronomie und Zeitrechnung im Karolingerreich [Astronomy and Chronology in the Carolingian Empire]". In Finger, Heinz (ed.). Mittelalterliche Handschriften der Kölner Dombibliothek: Erstes Symposion der Diözesan- und Dombibliothek Köln zu den Dom-Manuskripten [Medieval Manuscripts of the Cologne Cathedral Library: First Symposium on the Cathedral Manuscripts of the Archbishop's Diocesan and Cathedral Library in Cologne] (in German). Cologne: Erzbischöfliche Diözesan- und Dombibliothek. pp. 21–64. ISBN 978-3-939160-01-4.
- Von Euw, Anton (2008). Die St. Galler Buchkunst vom 8. bis zum Ende des 11. Jahrhunderts [St. Gallen Book Art from the 8th to the end of the 11th Century] (in German). St. Gallen: Verlag am Klosterhof. pp. 446–448. ISBN 978-3-906616-85-8.
