= Notker the Stammerer =

Composer, poet and scholar (c. 840–912)

- Notker Balbulus
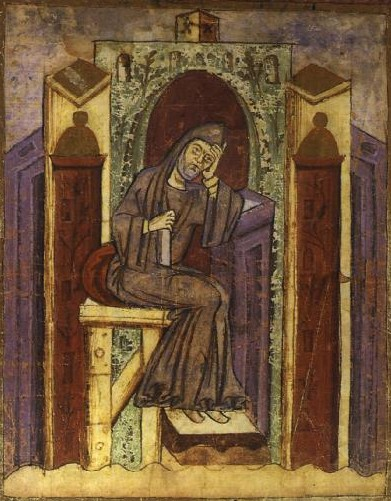
- Notker in a 10th century manuscript, probably from Saint Gall. (Note: The musicologist Richard Taruskin notes that in this depiction Notker seems to be "cudgeling his brain to recall a longissima melodia, as he tells us he did in the preface to his Liber Hymnorum".)
- Born: c. 840; Near the Abbey of Saint Gall
- Died: 6 April 912; Abbey of Saint Gall
- Notable work: Liber Hymnorum; Gesta Karoli Magni

Notker the Stammerer (c. 840 – 6 April 912), Notker Balbulus, or simply Notker, (Note: Less common names include Notker I, Notker of Saint Gall or Notker the Poet.) was a Benedictine monk at the Abbey of Saint Gall active as a composer, poet and scholar. Described as "a significant figure in the Western Church", Notker made substantial contributions to both the music and literature of his time. He is usually credited with two major works of the Carolingian period: the Liber Hymnorum, which includes an important collection of early musical sequences, and an early biography of Charlemagne, the Gesta Karoli Magni. His other works include a biography of Saint Gall known as the Vita Sancti Galli and a martyrology, among others.

Born near the Abbey of Saint Gall, Notker was educated alongside the monks Tuotilo and Ratpert; all three were composers, making the Abbey an important center of early medieval music. Notker quickly became a central figure of the Abbey and among the leading literary scholars of the Early Middle Ages. A renowned teacher, he taught Solomon III, the bishop of Constance and on occasion advised Charles the Fat. Although venerated by the Abbey of Saint Gall and the namesake of later scholars there such as Notker Physicus and Notker Labeo, Notker was never formally canonized. He was given "the Stammerer" as an epithet, due to his lifelong stutter.

== Life and career ==
Notker was born around 840, near the Abbey of Saint Gall in modern-day Switzerland. His wealthy family was of either Alemannic or Swiss descent and they owned land in Jonschwil of Thurgau. Notker's later biographer Ekkehard V claims he was born in Heiligau—now Elgg—in the Canton of Zürich, but this has been rejected by the historian Gerold Meyer von Knonau, who suggests a birthplace near Jonschwil. Since childhood Notker had a stutter, because of tooth loss in his youth, resulting in the Latin epithet balbulus (lit. 'babbler') or "the Stammerer" in English. The German musicologist Stefan Morent likened him to the partially blind Walafrid Strabo and Hermann of Reichenau, who had a limp, as three monks with physical impairments who achieved creative feats.

He began schooling at Saint Gall early in age and spent the rest of his life in the Abbey. His teachers included the Swiss monk Iso and the Irish monk Moengal, called "Marcellus" by Notker. He may have also been instructed by Grimald of Weissenburg, a student of Alcuin. The later book Casus monasterii Sancti Galli of Ekkehard IV "paints a lively picture of the monastery school", and notes that Notker was taught alongside Tuotilo and Ratpert; all three would become teachers and composers at the Abbey.

Although first and foremost a scholar, Notker held numerous positions at the Abbey including librarian in 890 and master of guests (hospitarius) in 892 and 894. He became established as a well-known teacher and was eventually appointed "master of the monastic school". Among his students was Solomon, who was later Bishop of Constance from 890 until his death in 912. Notker was often called upon for council from outside the Abbey; on occasion he advised Charles the Fat who visited the Abbey from 4–6 December 883. Charles was the dedicatee of Notker's De Carolo Magno, an early biography of Charlemagne. Ekkehard IV lauded Notker as "delicate of body but not of mind, stuttering of tongue but not of intellect, pushing boldly forward in things Divine, a vessel of the Holy Spirit without equal in his time".

Despite his renown in the Abbey, Notker never became an abbot of Saint Gall, and repeatedly declined abbacy offers elsewhere. (Note: Notker the Stammerer should not be confused with Notker, abbot of Saint Gall (d. 975) of a later generation.) Notker died in Saint Gall on 6 April 912.

== Musical works ==
=== Liber Hymnorum ===
Notker created the Liber Hymnorum ("Book of Hymns") during the late 9th century, an important early collection of Sequences dedicated to Liutward, the bishop of Vercelli. Completed in 884, it is essentially a set of melodies and texts organized by the Church calendar. The oldest surviving sources of the Liber Hymnorum date from either Notker's last years or directly after his death.

In the preface to his Liber Hymnorum, Notker claimed his musical work was inspired by an antiphoner that was brought to Gall from the Jumièges Abbey, soon after its destruction in 851. (Note: The musicologist Christopher Hohler has argued that the original word in Notker's account, Gimedia, does not translate to 'Jumièges' as is usually assumed. Hohler suggests that Notker was inspired by an antiphoner brought from Italy instead.) Notker was particularly inspired by the Jumièges chant book setting verses to the melodies, making them easier to remember; he goes on to discuss his childhood difficulties in recalling the melodiae longissimae.

=== Others ===
Numerous other musical works have been ascribed to Notker, with varying certainty. The sequence melody "Ave beati germinis" is attributed to him in one mid-10th century source.

Ekkehard IV's attribution of the melodies "Frigdola" and "Occidentan" is problematic since these appear to have existed before Notker's time. The hymn Media Vita was erroneously attributed to him by Jodocus Metzler in 1613.

== Literary works ==
For modern translations, see Farrier 1993, pp. 30–31

=== Gesta Karoli Magni ===
The Gesta Karoli Magni ("The Deeds of Charles the Great")—also known as De Carolo Magno ("Concerning Charles the Great")—is among the earliest biographies of Charlemagne, after the Vita Karoli Magni of Einhard. Notker the Stammerer is usually identified as the pseudonymous "Monk of Saint Gall" (Latin: Monachus Sangallensis) to whom the work is attributed. Numerous life details are shared between Notker and the unknown Monk, including their origin, education and long-term stay at Saint Gall. (Note: Due to textual details in the Gesta Karoli Magni, the "Monk of Saint Gall" is known to have been a native German-speaker, deriving from the Thurgau, only a few miles from the Abbey of Saint Gall; the region is also close to where Notker is believed to have derived from. The monk himself relates that he was raised by Adalbert, a former soldier who had fought against the Saxons, the Avars and the Slavs under the command of Kerold, brother of Hildegard, Charlemagne's second wife. He was also a friend of Adalbert's son, Werinbert, another monk at Saint Gall, who died as the book was in progress. His teacher was Grimald of Weissenburg, the Abbot of Saint Gall from 841 to 872, who was, the monk claims, himself a pupil of Alcuin.) The translator Lewis Thorpe concludes that the two are "probably the same person, although this cannot be proved".

The work is not a linear biography, but instead two books of exempla—anecdotal "moral tales"—relating chiefly to Charlemagne and his family. When discussed by scholars, Notker's work is often compared unfavorably to that of Einhard; the historian Philipp Jaffé derided Notker as one who "took pleasure in amusing anecdotes and witty tales, but who was ill-informed about the true march of historical events", and described the work itself as a "mass of legend, saga, invention and reckless blundering". Similarly, the classical scholar H. W. Garrod dismissed it as a "a largely mythical record". More sympathetically, the historian Matthew Innes has cited Notker's use of "humour and anecdotal style" as encouraging "a negative judgement [of] his abilities", noting that "Recent scholarship [on the Gesta Karoli Magni ] has stressed the underlying clarity of its intellectual vision and found coherent ideas about the correct ordering of society, church and politics."

=== Martyrology ===
Among Notker's literary works was the arrangement of a martyrology, which is a catalogue of martyrs or other Christian saints with short biographies. Written around 900, only a single incomplete copy survives, not including some saints born on 13–17 June, 3–6 July, 19–26 August, 27 October and 31 December. That the work survives incomplete may suggest Notker simply never finished his "ambitious project".

In his martyrology, Notker appeared to corroborate one of St Columba's miracles. St Columba, being an important father of Irish monasticism, was also important to St Gall, which had strong Irish connections. The abbot Adomnán wrote that at one point Columba had—through clairvoyance—seen a city in Italy near Rome being destroyed by fiery sulphur as a divine punishment and that three thousand people had perished. And shortly after Columba saw this, sailors from Gaul arrived to tell the news of it. Notker claimed in his martyrology that this event happened and that an earthquake had destroyed a city which was called 'new'. It is unclear what this city was that Notker was claiming, although some thought it may have been Naples, previously called Neapolis (lit. 'new city'). However Naples was destroyed by a volcano in 512 before Columba was born, and not during Columba's lifetime and the historian Richard Sharpe notes that "Notker was no better placed than anyone since to know what Adomnán intended".

=== Others ===
Notker completed the Breviarium Regum Francorum ("Breviary of the Frankish Kings") begun by Erchanbert. A Latin key explaining significative letters (performance instructions in some Gregorian chant) is attributed to Notker, though it is sometimes erroneously ascribed to Notker Labeo. (Note: See Froger 1962 for a modern translation of the Latin key)

== Legacy ==
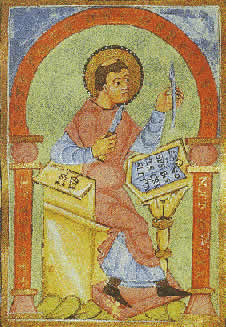
Depiction of Notker from an 11th-century manuscript

Scholars vary on evaluating Notker's main legacy; the priest Alban Butler asserted that his sequences were his most important achievement, while the historian Rosamond McKitterick states that he is best remembered for the Gesta Karoli Magni. Notker and Solomon II were the most important writers educated at Saint Gall, and Notker was among the both leading literary scribes and scholars of his time. He was the namesake of the later scholars Notker Physicus and Notker Labeo, who are referred to as "Notker II" and "Notker III" respectively. There was also Notker of Liège.

On Notker's canonization status, the English cleric John Donne noted that "he is a private Saint, for a few Parishes". According to the 16th-century historian Henricus Canisius, Notker' Sainthood was granted by Leo X in 1512 for Saint Gall and nearby churches, and in 1513 for the Diocese of Constance. The Catholic Encyclopedia interprets Leo's action as beatification. In Saint Gall and other churches he is commemorated annually on 6 April. Notker is listed as a beatified on 6 April in Roman Martyrology (2004).

In the mid-19th century the Swiss music scholar Anselm Schubiger was the first to transcribe almost all of Notker's extant melodies into modern notation. Many of his transcriptions are still in use, though older manuscript sources are available now that Schubiger did not have access to, meaning that "a more comprehensive approach to the sources will produce readings that are closer to Notker's own use, and better musically". In 2017, a modern edition for 20 of Notker's sequences was published by Stefan Morent via EOS Verlag.

St. Notker is venerated as a Saint in the Eastern Orthodox Church.

== Editions ==
Music

- Notker Balbulus (2017). Morent, Stevan [in German] (ed.). Sequenzen [Sequences] (in German). Translated by Schnoor, Franziska; Müller, Clemens (Ausgabe für die Praxis [Practice Edition] ed.). EOS Editions. ISBN 978-3-8306-7848-9. OCLC 1038709724. Also published by Verlag am Klosterhof, Sankt Ottilien, St. Gallen

Historical works

- Notkero Balbulo, Gesta Karoli. Un ritratto alternativo di Carlo Magno e del suo regno, Edizione critica a cura di M. Salaroli. Introduzione, traduzione italiana e commento di I. Pagani, Firenze, SISMEL - Edizioni del Galluzzo, 2026, ISBN 978-88-9290-426-2
