= Shep-en-Isis =

Daughter of a Theban priest and famous Egyptian mummy

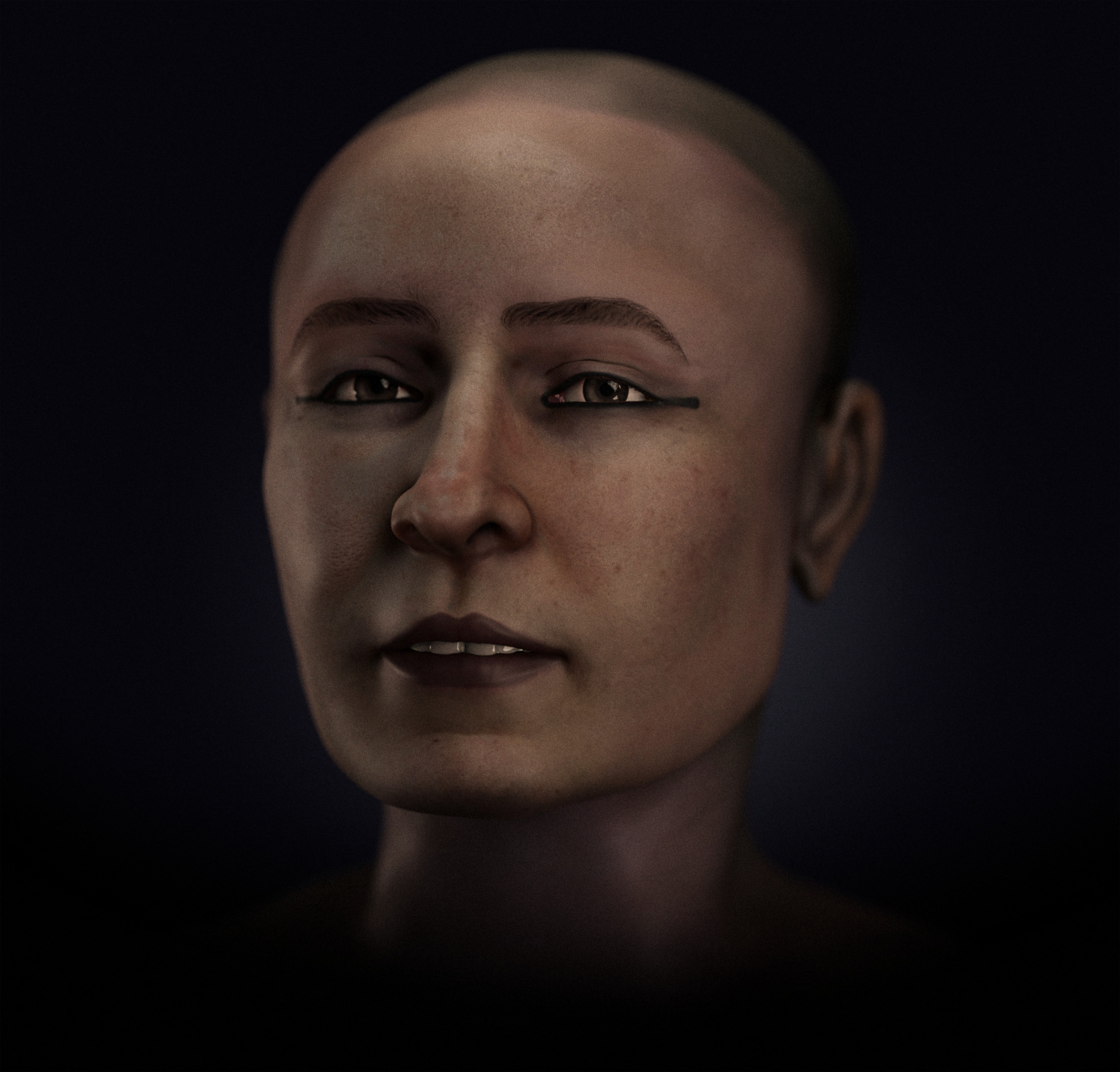
- Reconstructed face of Shep-en-Isis
- Born: c. 650 BC; Egypt
- Died: c. 620/610 BC (aged roughly 30-40); Waset? (now Luxor), Egypt
- Burial place: Deir el-Bahari, Luxor
- Other names: Schepenese
- Occupation: unknown
- Known for: One of the most famous Ancient Egyptian mummies ever discovered
- Father: Pa-es-tjenfi

Shep-en-Isis, or Schepenese, (c. 650 BC-c. 620/610 BC) was the daughter of Pa-es-tjenfi, a priest, and Tabes, of Thebes, Egypt. She was likely literate during her life. The identity of her husband, as well as whether she had any children, is unknown. Her mummified body is notable as her facial reconstruction was completed by forensic scientists in January 2022. She is one of the most famous mummies in Switzerland.

== Biography ==
Shep-en-Isis was alive during the Twenty-sixth Dynasty. She was born around 650 BC and died around 620 or 610 BC, aged between 30 and 40 years old.

She was buried in a 'family tomb', along with her father Pa-es-tjenfi, located within the temple of Pharaoh Hatshepsut, at Deir el-Bahari.

== History as a mummy ==
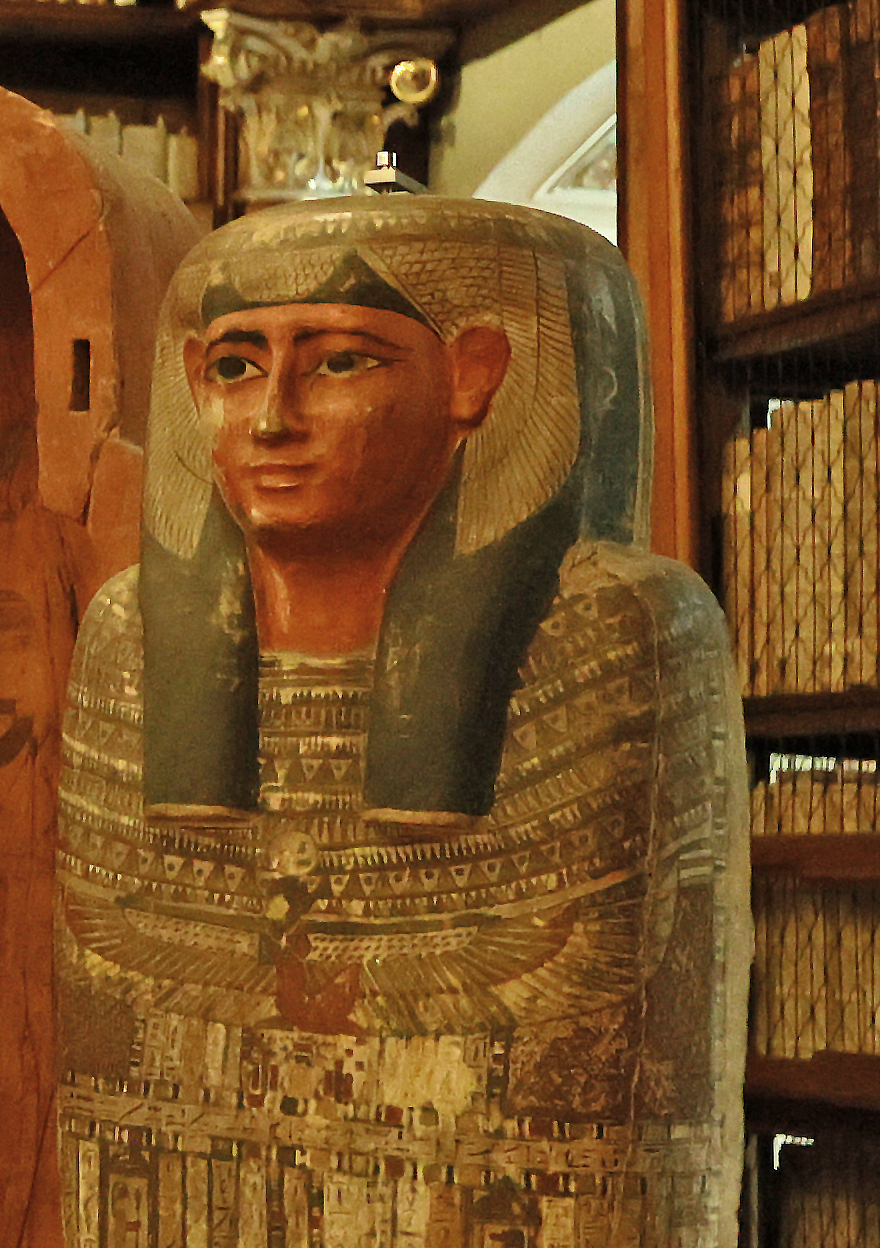
Detail of the sarcophagus of her mummy

Her mummy was discovered in a well-preserved state inside a casket in 1819 and in 1820, it was taken to the Abbey library of Saint Gall in Switzerland, making her one of the first mummies to be put on public display in Switzerland. Peter Scheitlin was the first to study the mummy of Shep-en-Isis and in 1836, the Catholic Grand Council College, as the supervising authority of the Abbey Library, decided to acquire the mummy for 440 guilders. Since then, it has officially been part of the inventory of the Abbey Library and is now considered one of the main attractions of the library. On 27 June 1903 an article by the Egyptologist Alexander Dedekind appeared in the St. Galler Tagblatt. In it, he dispelled the popular notion that the noble lady was the daughter of a pharaoh. Rather, she was the daughter of a priest. Dedekind translated her name as "Sheta-en-Isi" ("Secret of Isis"), which he improved shortly afterwards in other Tagblatt articles as "Schap-en-Isi" ("Gift of Isis"), or rather, "Shep-en-Isis".

During X-ray and computed tomography examinations in 1996, no evidence of an unusual cause of death could be found. The only apparent injuries were post mortem due to mummification itself. It was not until 2010 that the mummy could even be confirmed to belong to a woman. In January 2022, a paper was published about her mummy and a life reconstruction of her face was created.
