= Codex Sangallensis 250 =

9th century manuscript in Saint Gall, Switzerland

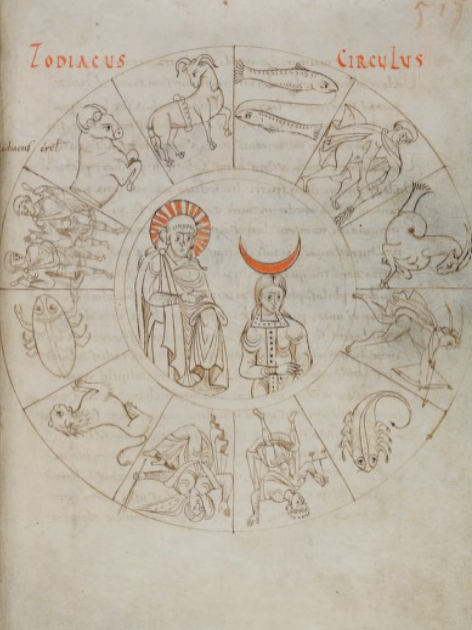
An illustration of the zodiac signs, with the sun (Sol) and the moon (Luna) in the middle

The Codex Sangallensis 250 is a manuscript which was compiled in the latter half of the 9th century at the abbey library of Saint Gall, where it remains today. It is an astronomical and computistical, 645-page-long encyclopedia written in Latin. The pages are made of parchment with a height of 24.7 cm and a width of 18 cm. The text was structured in a single column, with approximately 23 or 24 lines per page. It was mostly written in Carolingian minuscule, though the titles were either in rustic capitals or uncial script.

Both the texts and the illustrations in the codex were created by multiple scribes, as can be seen by the differing handwritings and drawing styles. The manuscript was most likely compiled under the supervision of Notker Balbulus during his time as a librarian, and the margins of page 28 feature some glosses written by him.

== Historical background ==
The didactic poem Phainomena ("Appearances") by the Greek poet Aratus constitutes the basis of the Codex Sangallensis 250. The original Phainomena is divided into two parts, the first of which deals with astronomical phenomena. The second part is concerned with meteorological events. The popularity of the Phainomena, particularly of its astronomical texts, led to a variety of Latin translations. One such translation was the Aratus Latinus, which was created in the early 8th century.

The Recensio Interpolata, a revision of the Aratus Latinus, was produced sometime in the latter half of the 8th century. The Recensio is ultimately the version of Aratus translations that the Cod. Sang. 250 would incorporate. In the Recensio, some philosophical and astrological passages were replaced with astronomical excerpts to make the text as a whole appear more coherent and intelligible. However, what ultimately set the Recensio apart from other versions was that illustrations were added to accompany the text.

Though the Codex Sangallensis 250 was based on the Recensio Interpolata, it is not a direct copy. Rather, the Cod. Sang. 250 was based on the Codex Sangallensis 902, which is a manuscript of the Recensio that was created in St. Gallen mid-9th century.

== Content ==
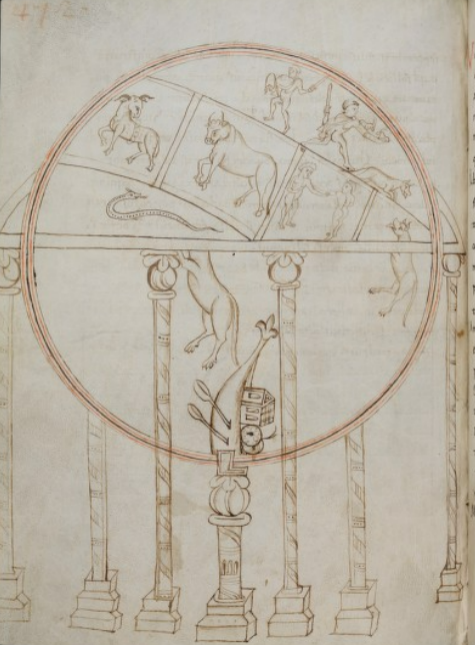
A celestial globe in a cradle mount, with zodiac signs

The manuscript is a collection of a variety of texts. Aside from the Recensio Interpolata, it contains three scientific works by Bede (De natura rerum, De temporibus, und De temporum ratione), the De astronomia, a work attributed to the Roman writer Gaius Julius Hyginus, as well as the martyrology by the Benedictine monk Wandalbert. Furthermore, the manuscript contains a multitude of annals, verses, computi, und other text excerpts.

The Cod. Sang. 250 does not only distinguish itself by its extensive collection of texts, but also by its numerous, detailed illustrations. They include drawings of constellations and of the astrological signs, as well as illustrations of celestial globes. Additionally, the manuscript contains a multitude of diagrams of elements such as planetary orbits or the seasons.

Since some illustrations in the Codex Sangallensis 250 differ from those in the Codex Sangallensis 902, it is assumed that the scribes of the Cod. Sang. 250 consulted another source during the creation of the manuscript.

Content	Page numbers	Description
Cycli decemnovennales	1–22	19-year cycles for calculations (Metonic cycle)
Miscellaneous	23–27	Diagrams of planets, text fragments, and empty pages
The martyrology	28–65	Directory of saints and their feast days
Computus	67–120	Calendar and tables for time calculations
De natura rerum	121–145	Deals with cosmological subjects such as celestial, as well as meteorological phenomena
De temporibus	146–163	Covers definitions of temporal concepts (such as days, months etc.), explains the computus, and presents a chronicle of the world
De temporum ratione	164–425	Expands on the topic of computi, with a focus on the easter cycle
Computus rules	426–446	Rules for date calculations
Recensio Interpolata	447–522	The Aratus Latinus and its accompanying illustrations
Miscellaneous	523–539	Astronomical excerpts and 12 neumatic verses
De astronomia	540–639	Describes the Ptolemaic constellations and offers multiple conceptions of the world
Miscellaneous	639–645	Paragraphs on the orbits of the sun and the moon

== Bibliography ==
- Chlench-Priber, Kathrin (2023). "Astronomie im Mittelalter [Astronomy in the Middle Ages]". In Dora, Cornel (ed.). Sterne – Das Firmament in St. Galler Handschriften [Stars - The Firmament in St. Gallen Manuscripts] (in German) (1 ed.). Basel: Schwabe Verlag. pp. 10–25. ISBN 978-3-7965-4815-4.
- Fuzzari Pisa, Marco (1996). "Der neue Pauly: Enzyklopädie der Antike A-Ari [The New Pauly: Encyclopaedia of Antiquity A-Ari]". In Cancik, Hubert; Schneider, Helmuth (eds.). Der neue Pauly: Enzyklopädie der Antike [The New Pauly: Encyclopaedia of Antiquity] (in German). Vol. 1. Stuttgart: J.B. Metzler. p. 958. ISBN 3-476-01470-3.
- Haffner, Mechthild (1997). Ein antiker Sternbilderzyklus und seine Tradierung in Handschriften vom frühen Mittelalter bis zum Humanismus: Untersuchungen zu den Illustrationen der "Aratea" des Germanicus [An Ancient Constellation Cycle and its Transmission in Manuscripts from the Early Middle Ages up to Humanism: Studies on the Illustrations of the "Aratea" by Germanicus]. Studien zur Kunstgeschichte (in German). Vol. 114. Hildesheim: Georg Olms Verlag. pp. 21–29. ISBN 3-487-10407-5.
- Mütherich, Florentine (1989). "Die Bilder: Einleitung". In Bischoff, Bernhard; Eastwood, Bruce; Klein, Thomas A.-P.; Mütherich, Florentine; Obbema, Pieter F. J. (eds.). Aratea: Aratus des Germanicus [Aratea: Commentary on the Aratus Germanicus] (in German). Lucerne: Faksimile-Verlag. pp. 31–36. ISBN 3-85672-027-8.
- Obbema, Pieter F. J. (1989). "Die Handschrift: Einleitung [The Manuscript: Introduction]". In Bischoff, Bernhard; Eastwood, Bruce; Klein, Thomas A.-P.; Mütherich, Florentine; Obbema, Pieter F. J. (eds.). Aratea: Kommentar zum Aratus des Germanicus [Aratea: Commentary on the Aratus Germanicus] (in German). Luzern: Faksimile-Verlag. pp. 9–10. ISBN 3-85672-027-8.
- Von Euw, Anton (2008). Die St. Galler Buchkunst vom 8. bis zum Ende des 11. Jahrhunderts [St. Gallen Book Art from the 8th to the end of the 11th Century]. St. Gallen: Verlag am Klosterhof. pp. 449–454. ISBN 978-3-906616-85-8.
