= Ekkehard V =

Ekkehard V (died c. 1220), called Minimus (the Least), was a monk of the Abbey of Saint Gall. He is the last of the Saint Gall Ekkehards, and flourished towards the end of the twelfth, and the beginning of the thirteenth, century. No particulars are known concerning his life, and tradition is silent as to his origin, the year of his birth and of his death. He was dean of the abbey in the reign of Innocent III.

About 1214 he wrote a life of St. Notker Balbulus, a learned monk of St. Gall, who lived towards the end of the ninth, and the beginning of the tenth, century (Acta SS., April, I, 579), from which work we gather that its author was versed in ecclesiastical music.

== Sources ==
- Herbermann, Charles, ed. (1913). "Ekkehard". Catholic Encyclopedia. New York: Robert Appleton Company.
