= Ratpert of Saint Gall =

Ratpert of St Gallen
- Born: c. 855
- Died: c. 911; Saint Gallen
- Education: The monastery "Inner School"
- Occupations: Teacher; Writer; Chronicler; Poet

Ratpert of St Gallen (c. 855 - c. 911) was a scholar, writer, chronicler and poet at the Abbey of Saint Gall. He wrote in Medieval Latin and in Old High German.

== Life ==
Ratpert probably entered the monastery as an oblate while still a child. The monastery operated two schools in parallel: the "inner school" prepared pupils for the monastic life while the "outer school" trained boys for the secular priesthood. Ratpert attended the St Gallen monastic "inner school", so was destined by his schooling to become a monk.

Ratpert's contemporaries in the "Inner School" included Notker the Poet and the charismatic poet-polymath Tuotilo of St Gallen: the three later became close colleagues in the monastery. Meanwhile, an "outer school" contemporary was the combative Salomo, later Bishop of Constance and Abbot at St Gallen itself. Ratpert's teachers were Iso and the (by provenance Irish) Moengal. Moengal had originally arrived with his uncle Marcus, an itinerant bishop, when they turned up at St Gallen as pilgrims, visiting the shrine of their compatriot, Saint Gallus. The uncle, Marcus, had moved on while Moengal had stayed at St Gallen and entered the monastery. Here the monks renamed him Marcellus (Little Marcus), recalling the name of his departed uncle.

Ratpert took his own monastic vows some time around 873. The earliest surviving example of his writing that can be firmly dated is a legal deed dated 29 May 876. He himself taught at the Monastery School for many years. The last example of his work as a deed writer that can be dated was produced on 10 February 902. His precise year of death is not known, but has been placed by recent research around 911. The month and day of his death year were 25 October, and his name is recorded under this day in the monastery's Book of the Dead.

== Works ==
In addition to his duties as monastery school master and his activities as a writer of legal records, Ratpert produced poetry and chronicled the history of the abbey. Little of his poetry has survived.

His other works include the All Saints' Day Litany, "Ardua spes mundi" (The World's highest hope"), the Eucharist song "Laudes, omnipotens, ferimus" ("We bring you praise, all powerful one"), an Old High German "St Gallen Song" and his Chronicle of the Monastery, "Casus sancti Galli" (literally "The Matter of St Gallen"). The Chronicle of the Monastery was subsequently, in the eleventh century, continued by Ekkehard IV (c. 980-c. 1056), who at the time was also in charge of the Monastery School. Ratpert's original "St Gallen Song" survives today only in the form of its Latin translation, which was also penned by Ekkehard.

== Reading list ==
- Gerold Meyer von Knonau: Ratpert. In: Allgemeine Deutsche Biographie (ADB).Vol 27, Duncker & Humblot, Leipzig 1888, Page 365
- Fidel Rädle: Ratpert von St. Gallen, in: Die deutsche Literatur des Mittelalters. Verfasserlexikon. 2nd Edition. Part 7. 1989, Pages 1032–1035
- Hannes Steiner: Ratpert. In: Historical Dictionary of Switzerland
- Peter Stotz: Ardua spes mundi. Studien zu lateinischen Gedichten aus Sankt Gallen (= Geist und Werk der Zeiten. Arbeiten aus dem Historischen Seminar der Universität Zürich, Vol 32), Herbert Lang, Bern 1972, ISBN 3-261-00431-2.
- Werner Vogler: Ratpert von St. Gallen. In: Lexikon des Mittelalters (LexMA). Vol (Band) 7, LexMA-Verlag, München 1995, ISBN 3-7608-8907-7, Page 462.
- Georg Rudolph Zimmermann: Ratpert, der erste Zürchergelehrte. Ein Lebensbild aus dem neunten Jahrhundert, Basel 1878.
