= Grimalt Codex =

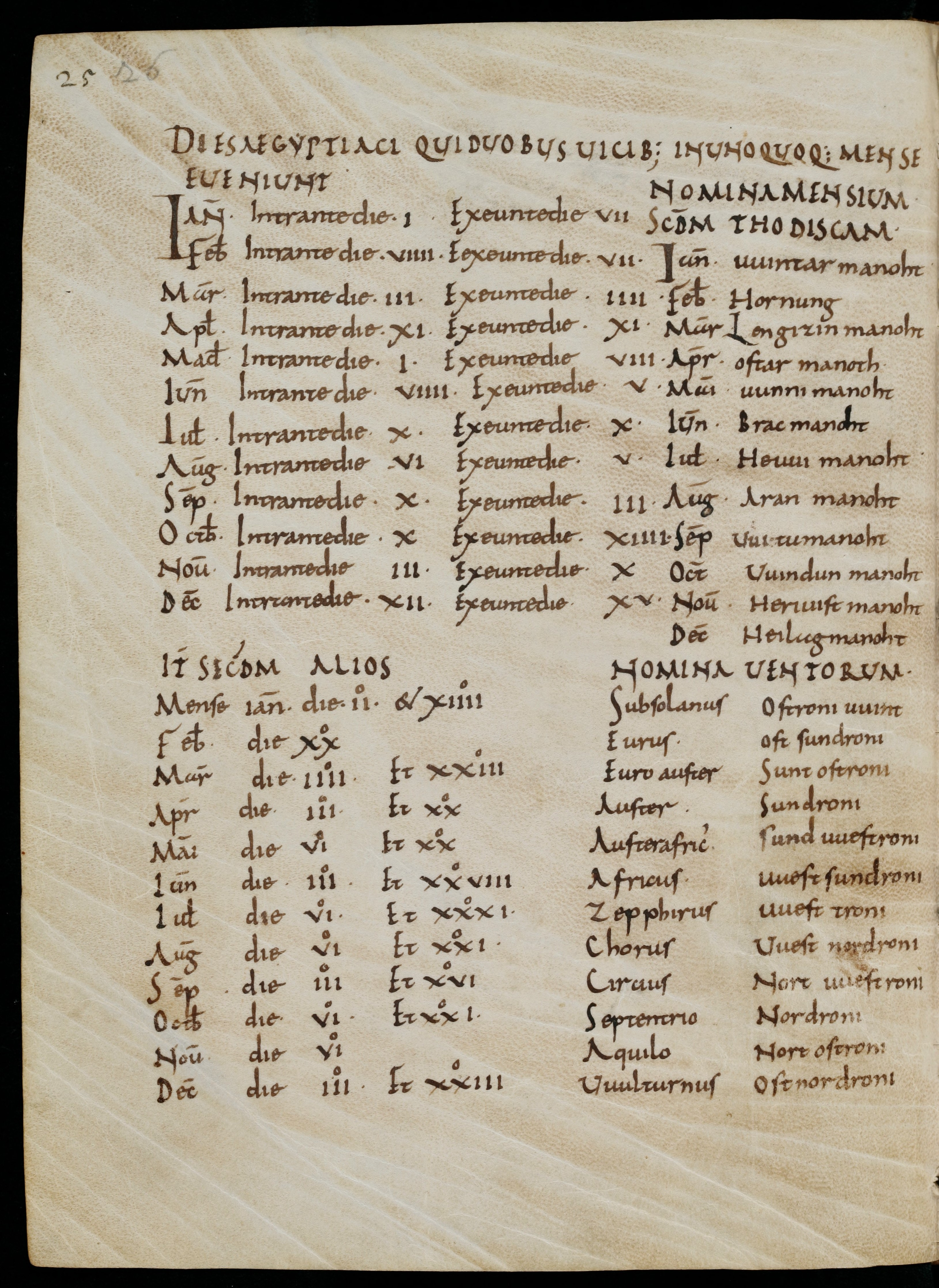
Egyptian days in the Grimalt Codex

The Grimalt Codex is a manuscript, now no. 397 in the abbey library of Saint Gall. It is a miscellany, containing poetic, liturgical, computistic, mythological, scientific and historical material, including a calendar and glossaries, in both Latin and Old High German. It is named for its owner and probably compiler, Abbot Grimald of Saint Gall (r. 841–872).

== Creation ==
The Grimalt Codex contains 148 parchment pages in ten quires and measures 21 by 16 centimetres (8.3 in × 6.3 in). In its final form, the manuscript is the work of about forty different scribes. The poetic collection Codex Sangallensis 899, also from Saint Gall, marks a text copied from the codex with the words "De libro Grimaldi tuli" ('I took from Grimald's book'). Other texts copied from the codex are marked with the initial G. This at least indicates that Grimald was the onetime owner of the codex and is usually taken to indicate that he was its compiler. Grimald himself may have written some of the material.

The codex was a composite at the time of its binding. The paleographer Bernhard Bischoff identified two groups of quires, labelling them A–G and I–III. The actual order of the quires is I–II–III–G–A–B–C–D–E–F with I–II and A–F forming units while III and G are "loose" quires. Bischoff dated A–F to the 830s and placed its composition at the court of Louis the Pious, but I–III were composed in the period 855–867. G was compiled independently.

The latest dated entry in the codex is from 867. Following the obituaries of the emperors Charlemagne (815 [sic]) and Louis the Pious (840), it notes that Louis the German has ruled with "the imperial power in east Francia" for 27 years. This may be the year when it came together as a codex. It was given by Grimald to King Louis.

== Contents ==
The nature and purpose of the Grimalt Codex are disputed. It has been seen as the surviving vade mecum (personal reference handbook) of Abbot Grimald. That description may only apply to quires I–III and G, while A–F are a pedagogical textbook. Eric Goldberg sees the material as related to the functioning of the royal palace.

Qires I–II contain liturgies for Lauds and Litany; prayers of acclamation for the health and salvation of Louis, Queen Emma, their children and the army; sermons by Augustine of Hippo; a summary set of annals covering the years 815–867; and blessings for the ordeal of fire and boiling water.

Quire III includes a hodgepodge of information, including a poem on days of the week; obituaries and annalistic notices scattered throughout; two medical recipes for curing fever; a horologium; the Greek alphabet; two sets of Egyptian days; the Frankish names of the months; the names of the winds; a poem on Queen Hildegard; the treatise De sex cogitationibus; the Exultet liturgy; and chapter 19 from Bede's De temporum ratione. Among the annals in this section are notice of a lunar eclipse and notices of Louis the German's victories in the battle of the Ries and battle of Fontenoy.

Quire G is a grammatical and literary handbook, possibly the last part of the codex to come together on the personal initiative of Grimald. It contains poems on the transiencey of life, including an epigram of Ausonius and his De rosis nascentibus. It also contains a copy of the ancient Notitia Galliarum.

The Grimalt Codex contains the oldest surviving copy of the 'official' or 'A' recension of the Vita Karoli Magni, a biography of Charlemagne.

== Works cited ==
- Goldberg, Eric J. (2006). Struggle for Empire: Kingship and Conflict under Louis the German, 817–876. Cornell University Press.
- Nelson, Janet L. (2006). "Tracking Einhard's 'Life of Charlemagne'". The Journal of Ecclesiastical History. 57 (2): 301–307. doi:10.1017/s0022046905006263.
- van Raaij, Lenneke (n.d.). "Studying Dies Aegyptiaci in Ninth-Century St. Gall". Academia.edu.
