= Notker Labeo =

Benedictine monk (950–1022)

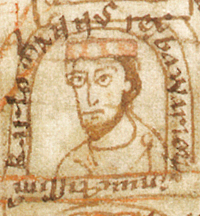
- Notker Labeo, relief at the Abbey of St Gall.
- Born: c. 950
- Died: 28 June 1022

Notker Labeo (c. 950 – 28 June 1022), also known as Notker the German (Latin: Notcerus Teutonicus) or Notker III, was a Benedictine monk active as a scholar and teacher. He was the first commentator on Aristotle active in the Middle Ages and translated the works of earlier Latin writers such as Boethius and Martianus Capella. Notker is also attributed the authorship of five short essays on music.

Labeo means 'the thick-lipped one'. Later he was named Teutonicus in recognition of his services to the German language.

== Life and career ==
He was born about 950, from a noble family of Thurgau, and he was a nephew of Ekkehard I, the poet of Waltharius. He went to the Abbey of Saint Gall when only a boy, and there acquired a vast and varied knowledge by omnivorous reading. After finishing his education, he continued in the abbey as a teacher and then head of the school under abbot Burckhard II. His contemporaries admired him as a theologian, philologist, mathematician, astronomer, connoisseur of music, and poet. He tells of his studies and his literary work in a letter to Bishop Hugo of Sitten (998–1017), and we also know of his activities through texts from his pupil Ekkehard IV.

The Necrologium sancti Galli recorded his death under 28 June, 1022, as "Obitus Notkeri doctissimi atque benignissimi magistri". He died stricken by the plague.

Among his most distinguished pupils are the aforementioned Ekkehard IV, Salomo III bishop of Constance, and Batherus, a wandering scholar who wrote a biography of St. Fridolin.

== Writings and translations ==
For the benefit of his pupils he translated several texts from Latin into German. He mentions eleven of these translations, but unfortunately only five are preserved: (1) Boethius, "De consolatione philosophiae"; (2) Martianus Capella, "De nuptiis Philologiae et Mercurii"; (3) Aristotle, "De categoriis"; (4) Aristotle, "De interpretatione"; (5) "The Psalter". Among those lost are: "The Book of Job", at which he worked for more than five years; "Disticha Catonis"; Virgil's "Bucolica"; and the "Andria" of Terence (Terenz in German).

Of his own writings he mentions in the above letter a "New Rhetoric" and a "New Computus" and a few other smaller works in Latin. We still possess the Rhetoric, the Computus (a manual for calculating the dates of ecclesiastical celebrations, especially of Easter), the essay "De partibus logicae", and the German essay on Music.

In R. Kögel's opinion Notker Labeo was one of the greatest stylists in German literature. "His achievements in this respect seem almost marvelous." His style, where it becomes most brilliant, is essentially poetical; he observes with surprising exactitude the laws of the language and created the first systematic orthography of Old High German and Swiss German. Latin and German he commanded with equal fluency; and while he did not understand Greek, he pretended that he did. He put an enormous amount of learning and erudition into his commentaries on his translations. Much may be found that was of interest in his time, philosophy, universal and literary history, natural science, astronomy. He frequently quotes the classics and the Fathers of the Church. It is characteristic of Notker that at his dying request the poor were fed, and that he asked to be buried in the clothes which he was wearing in order that none might see the heavy chain with which he had been in the habit of mortifying his body.

== Sources ==
- Gushee, Lawrence (2001). "Notker Labeo". Grove Music Online. Revised by Bradley Jon Tucker. Oxford: Oxford University Press. doi:10.1093/gmo/9781561592630.article.20129. (subscription, Wikilibrary access, or UK public library membership required)
- Kampers, Franz [in German]; Löffler, Klemens [in German] (1911). "Notker". Catholic Encyclopedia. New York: Robert Appleton Company.
