= Tuotilo =

Medieval composer and monk (died 915)

Saint Tuotilo OSB
- Died: 915; Abbey of Saint Gall, St. Gallen, Switzerland
- Venerated in: Catholic Church
- Feast: 28 March

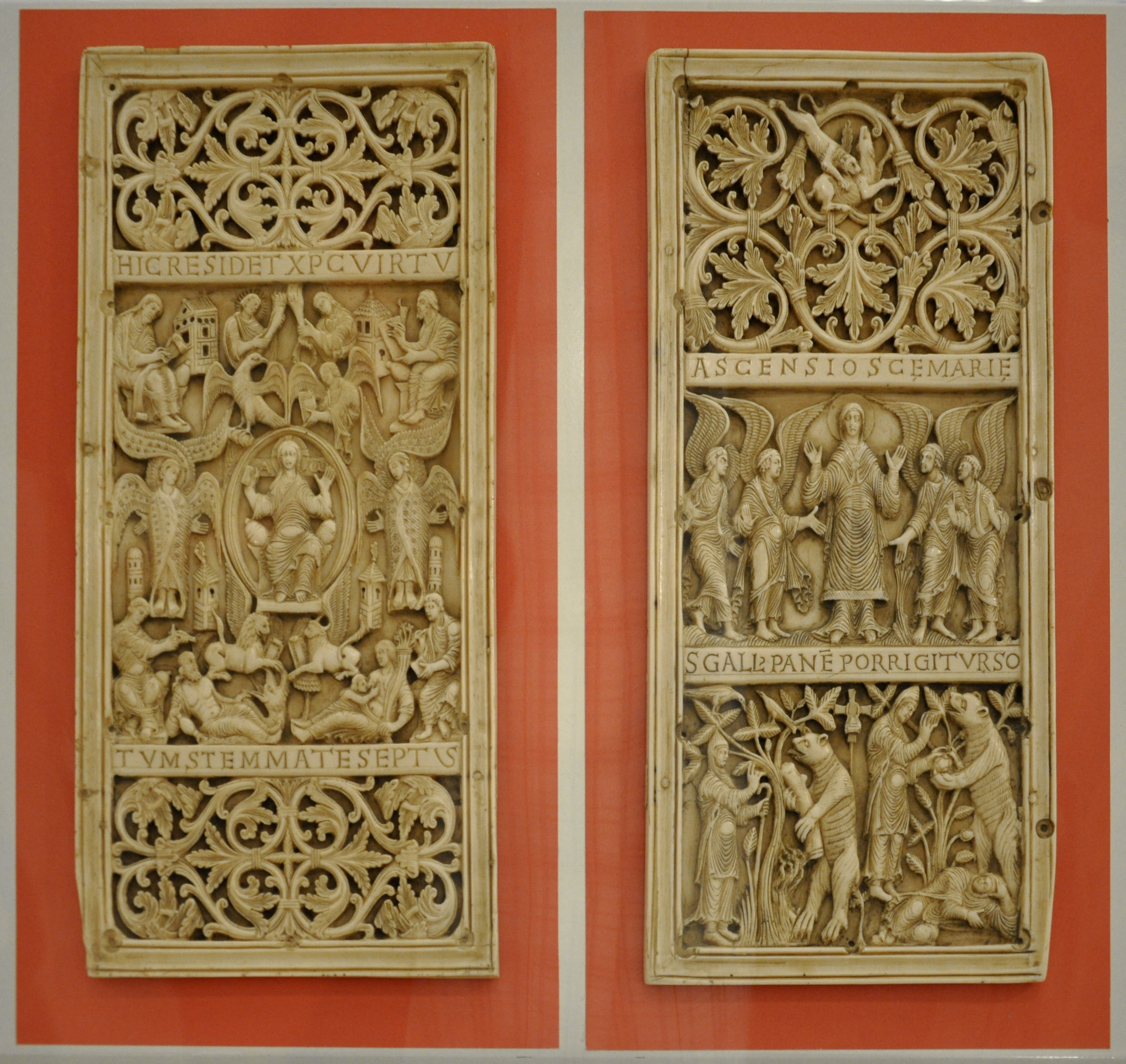
Two ivory tablets attributed to Tuotilo

Tuotilo or Tutilo OSB (died 915) was a Frankish monk at the Benedictine Abbey of Saint Gall. He was a composer, and according to Ekkehard IV a century later, also a poet, musician, painter and sculptor. Various trope melodies can be assigned to Tuotilo, but works of other mediums are attributed with less certainty. He was a student of Iso of St. Gallen and friends with the fellow monk Notker the Stammerer.

== Life and career ==
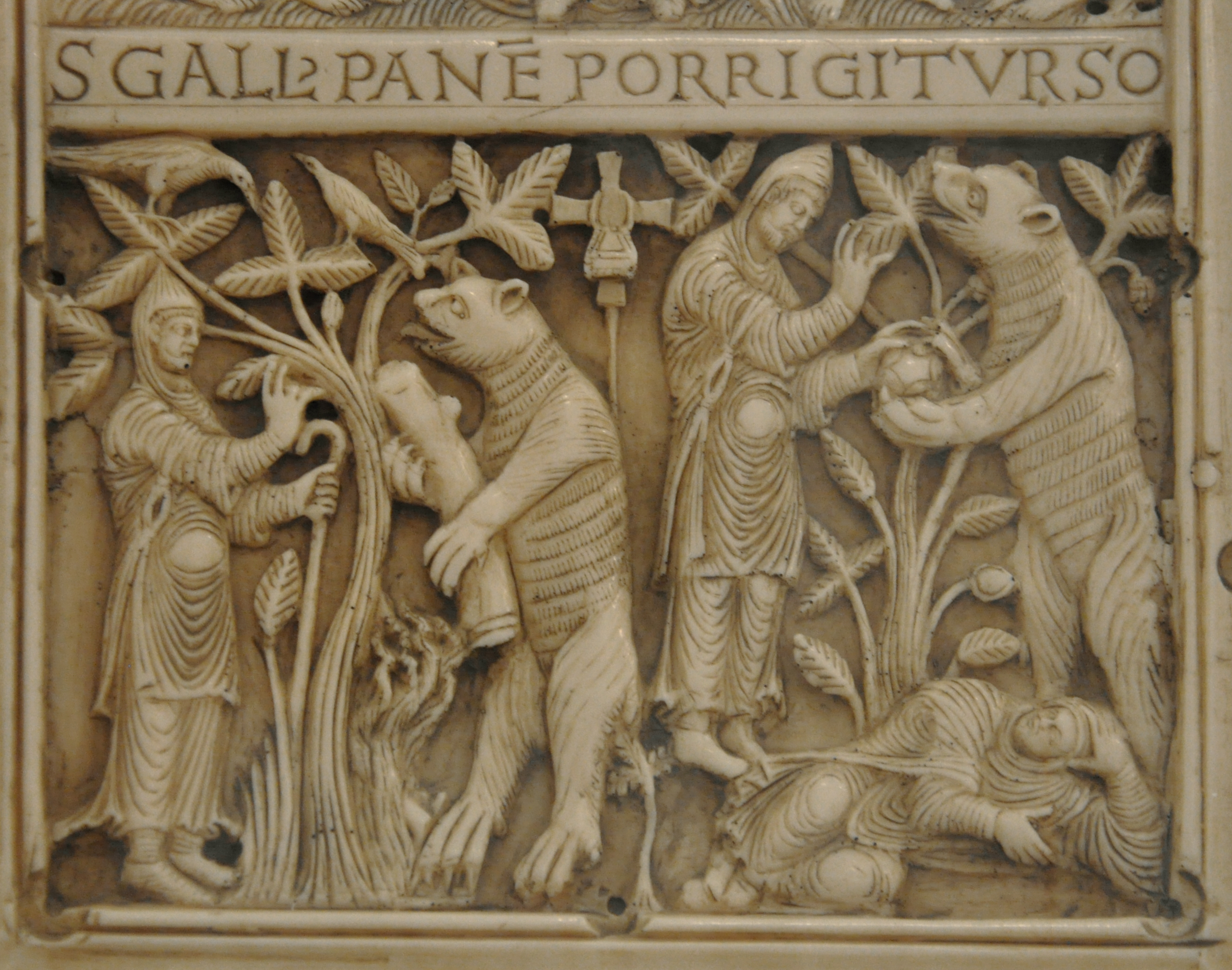
Detail of an ivory tablet attributed to Tuotilo

Born in Alemannic Germany, (Note: According to his biographer, who based his account on Ekkehard IV, Tuotilo was of Alemannic origin, see Rüsch, Ernst Gerhard: Tuotilo. Mönch und Künstler. Beiträge zur Kenntnis seiner Persönlichkeit (St. Gallen, 1953)) he is said to have been a large and powerfully built man, and an excellent boxer. Always cheerful and in excellent spirits, he was a general favorite. He received his education at St. Gall's, from Iso of St. Gallen and the Irishman Moengall, teachers in the monastic school. He was the friend of Notker of St. Gall, with whom he studied music under Moengal. Educated at the Abbey of St. Gall, he remained to become a monk there.

Tuotilo was a composer, poet, musician, painter and sculptor.

According to the British librarian John W Bradley, Tuotilo was said to be "a good speaker, had a fine musical voice, was a capital carver in wood, and an accomplished illuminator. Like most of the earlier monks of St. Gall, he was a clever musician, equally skillful with the trumpet and the harp. Besides being teacher of music in the upper school to the sons of the nobility, he was a classical tutor and could preach both in Latin and Greek. His chief accomplishments, however, were music and painting, and on these his reputation mainly rests. He was much in request and by the permission of his abbot travelled to distant places. One of his celebrated sculptures was the image of the Blessed Virgin for the cathedral at Metz. In addition, he was a mathematician and astronomer, and constructed an astrolabe or orrery, which showed the courses of the planets".

== Works ==
=== Music ===
Tuotilo played several instruments, including the harp. The history of the ecclesiastical drama begins with the trope sung as Introit of the Mass on Easter Sunday. It has come down to us in a St. Gallen manuscript dating from the time of Tuotilo. According to the works catalogue of Ekkehard IV, Casus sancti Galli, Tuotilo is the author of five tropes; further research ascribed five additional tropes to him. Some of them are available in modern editions.

=== Art ===
James Midgley Clark points out that the most interesting items at the St. Gallen Abbey in Switzerland are the ivory tablets attributed to Tuotilo, which form the cover of the Evangelium Longum. Tuotilo's paintings can be found at Konstanz, Metz, St. Gallen, and Mainz.

== Legacy ==
Tuotilo was buried at a chapel dedicated to Saint Catherine in St. Gall, which was later renamed for him. His feast day is celebrated on 28 March.
