= Ekkehard IV =

Swiss monk

Ekkehard IV (c. 980 – c. 1056) was a monk of the Abbey of Saint Gall and the author of the Casus sancti Galli and Liber Benedictionum.

== Life ==
According to the testimony in his "Chronicle" (especially in view of his statement that he had heard from eyewitnesses of the great conflagration at St. Gall in 937), the date of his birth is usually placed about 980; he died 21 October but the year of his death is unknown (1036?–1060?). The same "Chronicle" indicates Alsace as his birthplace, though we do not know with certainty either the place of his birth, or his family origin. His boyhood was spent at St. Gall where he had for tutor Notker Labeo the German, one of the most learned scholars of his time. From him Ekkehard acquired a profound knowledge of the Latin and Greek classics; he also studied mathematics, astronomy, and music, and was acknowledged while living as a scholar of note even outside the monastery. After the death of Notker Labeo (1022), Ekkehard was called to Mainz by Archbishop Aribo, where he became director and teacher in the cathedral school, and held both offices until the death of his patron (1031), distinguishing himself as head of the school; indeed, he was noted as a successful teacher and promoter of learning.

A treatise on the "Jube me, Domine, benedicere", inscriptions, and benediction prayers remain as evidences of his literary activity. Emperor Conrad II, when at Ingelheim near Mainz, distinguished him by marks of personal favour (Easter, 1030). Shortly after his return to St. Gall, Abbot Tietbald died (1034) and Norbert of Stavelot, who introduced the reforms of Cluny, was elected to succeed him. A dissension, therefore, arose among the monks, the seniors being dissatisfied with the new reforms.

== Writings ==
=== Casus sancti Galli ===
During the time of the Cluny controversy at St. Gall, Ekkehard began to work on the ancient abbey chronicle, the Casus S. Galli, begun by Ratpert and continued to Abbot Salomon (883), and carried it on from that date to Notker (972). This work is an important document for the contemporary history of St. Gall. It is also the main source of our knowledge concerning the Ekkehards. The Casus is mostly a compilation of anecdotes and traditions concerning distinguished monks. They contain, however, many historical inaccuracies and misrepresentations. Nevertheless, rich with medieval Latin idioms, they are a valuable source of contemporary history, especially of its culture.

=== Liber Benedictionum ===
The second important literary work of Ekkehard is his Liber Benedictionum. It comprises metrical inscriptions for the walls of the Mainz cathedral, and benedictions (also in verse) for use in choir services, at meals, and poems in honour of the festivals of various saints, partly authored by Ekkehard and partly by Notker Labeo. In poetical merit these works are somewhat inferior, nevertheless they betray a very fair knowledge of Latin. The glosses from his pen, both on his own manuscripts and others belonging to the abbey, remain as proof of his lifelong zeal in pursuit of knowledge. He was also skilled in music, particularly ecclesiastical music, always diligently and successfully cultivated at St. Gall.

== Opposition to Unleavened Eucharist ==
Ekkehard was one of the most ardent critics of use of an unleavened Eucharist, a practice which had been spreading in the West since its accidental invention in the seventh century.

== Sources ==
- Herbermann, Charles, ed. (1913). "Ekkehard". Catholic Encyclopedia. New York: Robert Appleton Company.
