= Solomon III (bishop of Constance) =

Swiss Catholic bishop

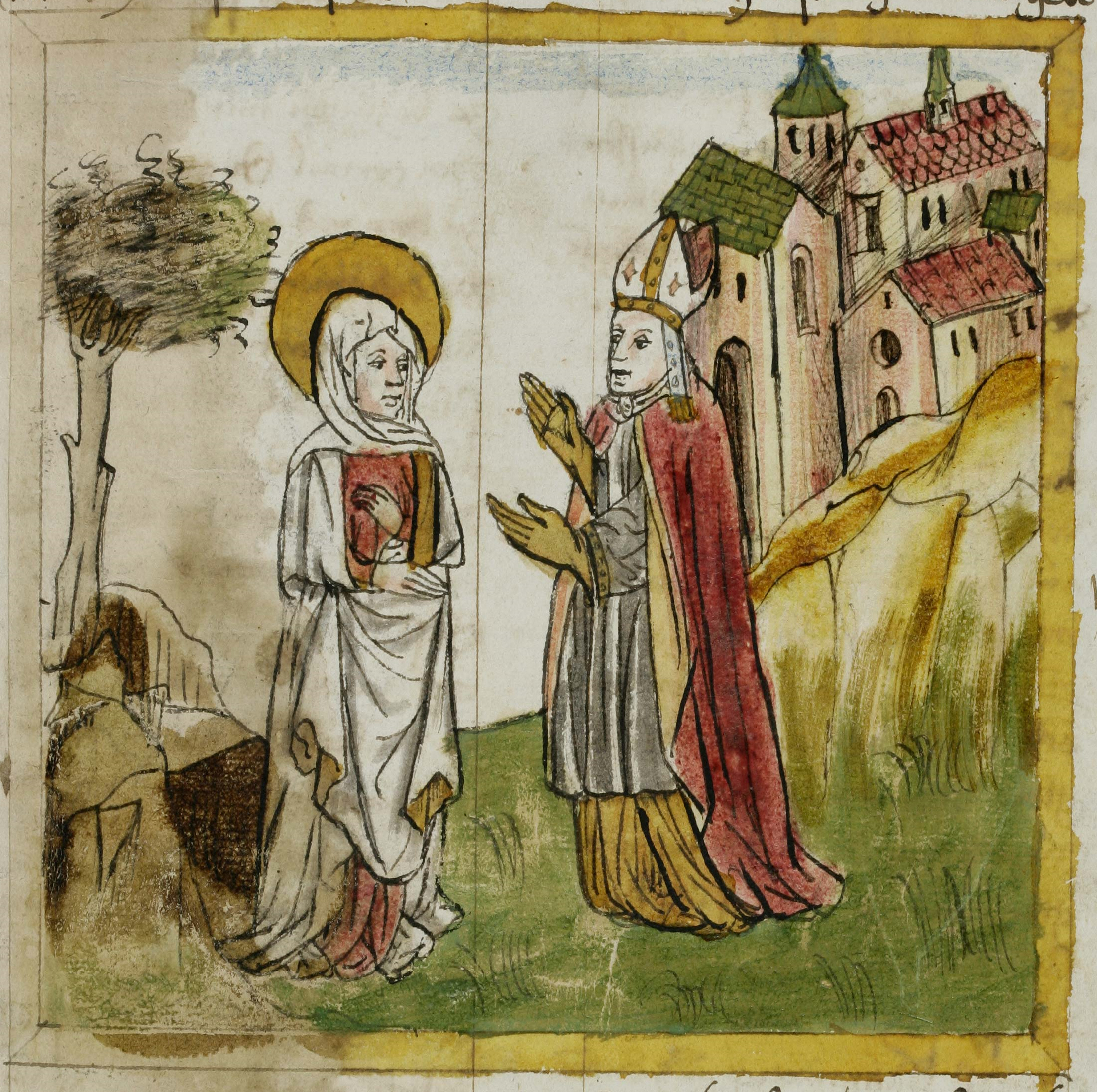
Solomon III with Saint Wiborada

Solomon III (died 919) was the Bishop of Constance from 890 to his death. In 885, the Emperor Charles III made him archchancellor of the Empire, for Konstanz was then the greatest diocese in Swabia, which had been Charles' original kingdom and was still his home most of the time. As well as bishop, he was also abbot of Reichenau and Saint Gall, immensely powerful abbeys in Swabia. Solomon founded a church in honour of Saint Magnus at Saint Gall. Solomon was a warlike prelate, originally an ally of both King Louis the Child and Count Palatine Erchanger in the wars for the Swabian dukedom against the Burchards. He was influential in the execution of Burchard I in 911, but he left his alliance with Erchanger when the latter allied with King Conrad I. Erchanger even imprisoned Solomon in 914. Conrad, however, supported the bishop and freed him. Conrad later had Erchanger beheaded.

== External reading ==
- von Scheffel, Joseph Viktor (1895). Ekkehard: A tale of the tenth century. Google eBook.
