= Abbey library of Saint Gall =

Monastery library in St. Gallen, Switzerland

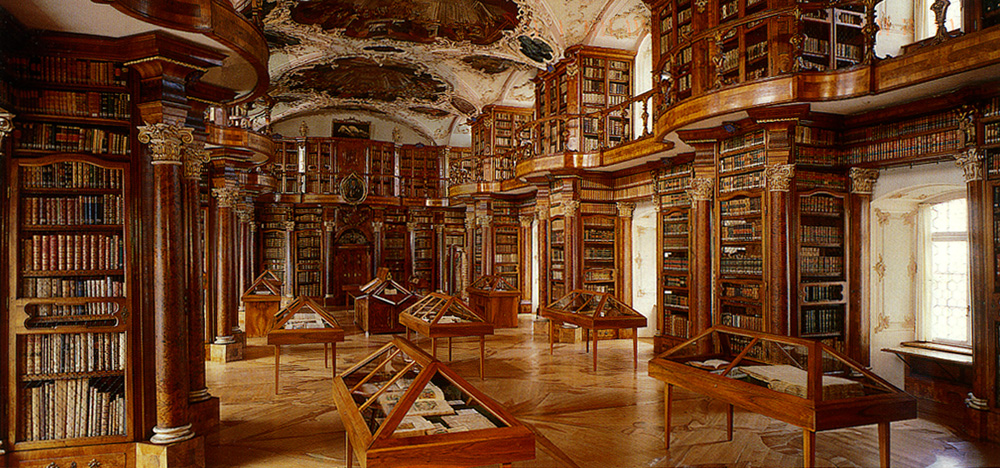
- 47°25′22″N 9°22′35″E
- Location: Switzerland

Other information
- Website: Official website

The abbey library of St Gall (German: Stiftsbibliothek) is a significant medieval monastic library located in St. Gallen, Switzerland. In 1983, the library, as well as the Abbey of St Gall, were designated a World Heritage Site, as "an outstanding example of a large Carolingian monastery and was, since the 8th century until its secularisation in 1805, one of the most important cultural centres in Europe". It is one of the oldest monastic libraries in the world.

== History and architecture ==
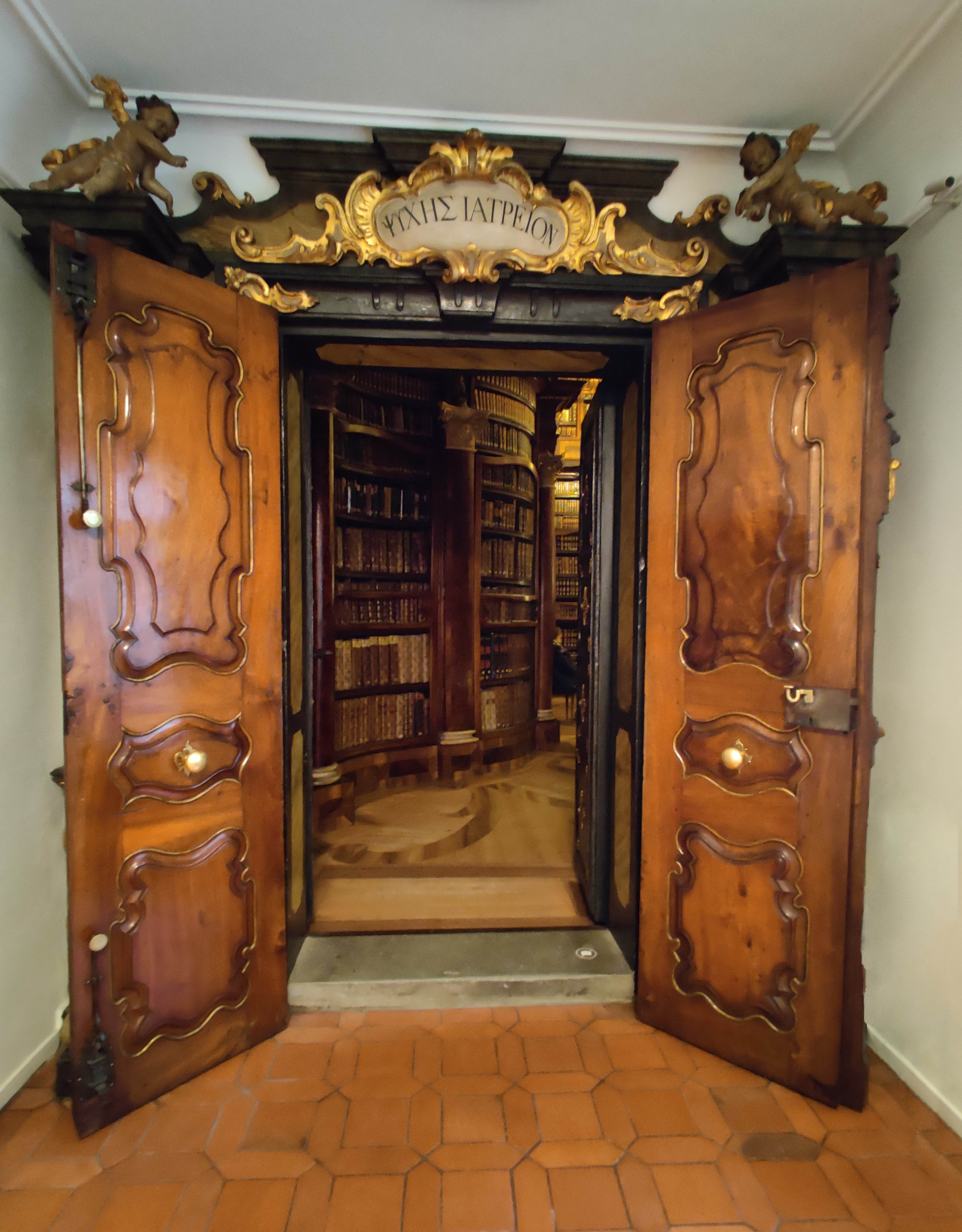
Entrance of the Abbey's library. On top of the entrance there is the Greek inscription: "ΨΥΧΗΣ ΙΑΤΡΕΙΟΝ", meaning "The Healing Place of the Soul".

The library was founded by Saint Othmar, founder of the Abbey of St. Gall. During a fire in 937, the Abbey was destroyed, but the library remained intact. The library hall, designed by the architect Peter Thumb in a Rococo style, was constructed between 1758 and 1767. There is a Greek inscription above the entrance door, ΨΥΧΗΣ ΙΑΤΡΕΙΟΝ (psukhēs iatreion). It translates as "healing place for the soul", based on an inscription at the Library of Ramesses II.

== Collections ==
The library collection is the oldest in Switzerland, and one of the earliest and most important monastic libraries in the world. The library holds almost 160,000 volumes, with most available for public use. In addition to other printed books, the collection includes 1650 incunabula (books printed before 1500), and 2100 manuscripts dating back to the 8th through 15th centuries; among the most notable of the latter are items of Irish, Carolingian, and Ottonian production. These codices are held inside glass cases, each of which is topped by a carved cherub offering a visual clue as to the contents of the shelves below; for instance, the case of astronomy-related materials bears a cherub observing the books through a telescope. Books published before 1900 are to be read in a special reading room. The manuscript B of the Nibelungenlied is kept here.

A virtual library has been created to provide broader access to the manuscripts: Codices Electronici Sangallenses. This project has been expanded to include codices from other libraries as well and is operating under the name e-codices. Currently, more than 900 manuscripts from the Abbey library of St Gall are available in digital format.

The library is home to the mummy of Shep-en-Isis.

== Manuscripts ==
- Codex Sangallensis 18
- Codex Sangallensis 48
- Codex Sangallensis 56
- Codex Sangallensis 250
- Codex Sangallensis 397
- Codex Sangallensis 878
- Codex Sangallensis 902
- Codex Sangallensis 1394

== See also ==
- Codex Sangallensis (disambiguation), several codices
- List of World Heritage Sites in Europe
- de:Stiftsarchiv St. Gallen
