= Bath =

Bath may refer to:

- Bathing, immersion in a fluid
  - Bathtub, a large open container for water, in which a person may wash their body
  - Public bathing, a public place where people bathe
- Thermae, ancient Roman public bathing facilities

== Places ==
- Bath, Somerset, a city and World Heritage Site in the south-west of England, UK
  - Bath (UK Parliament constituency)
- Bath, Barbados, a populated place
- Bath, Jamaica, a town and mineral spring in Saint Thomas Parish, Jamaica
- Bath, Netherlands
- Bath Island, a neighbourhood in Saddar Town, Pakistan

=== Canada ===
- Bath, New Brunswick, Canada
- Bath, Ontario, Canada

=== United States ===
- Bath, California
- Bath, Georgia
- Bath, Illinois
- Bath, Indiana
- Bath, Kentucky
- Bath County, Kentucky
- Bath, Maine
  - Bath Iron Works, in the above city
- Bath, Michigan
- Bath, New Hampshire
- Bath, New York, a town
  - Bath (village), New York, village within the town of Bath
- Bath, North Carolina
  - Bath Historic District (Bath, North Carolina)
- Bath, Ohio, within the township in Summit County
- Bath, Pennsylvania
- Bath, South Carolina
- Bath, South Dakota
- Bath County, Virginia
- Bath, West Virginia, more commonly known by the name of its post office, Berkeley Springs
- Bath Mountain, a mountain in California
- Bath Township (disambiguation)

== Sport ==
- Bath Rugby, a professional rugby union club in the English city
- Bath City F.C., a semi-professional football club based in Bath, Somerset

== Organisations ==
- University of Bath, UK

== People ==
- Bath (surname)

== Titles of Nobility ==
- Earl of Bath
- Marquess of Bath

== Other ==
- Bath (unit), a unit of liquid volume used by the ancient Hebrews
- Bath (quantum mechanics), a method of describing the environment in an open quantum system
- Bath (album), an album by Maudlin of the Well
- Baths (musician), an electronic music artist
- Bath Profile, an international Z39.50 specification

== See also ==
- Baath (disambiguation)
- Baden (disambiguation), the equivalent German placename
- The Bath (disambiguation)
- Bath bun
- Bath County (disambiguation)
- Bath Historic District (disambiguation)
- Bath salts
- Bath Spa (disambiguation)
- Bath treatment (fishkeeping)
- Bathurst (disambiguation)
- Bird bath
- Order of the Bath, a British order of chivalry founded by George I
