= Bathtime =

Bathtime may refer to:

- A time to bathe

== Television ==
=== Episodes ===
- "Bathtime", an episode of the television series Astro Farm
- "Bathtime", an episode of the television series Go Baby!
- "Bathtime", an episode of the television series Shaun the Sheep
- "Bathtime", an episode of the television series Sooty Show
- "Bathtime", an episode of the television series The Cat in the Hat Knows a Lot About That! as well as one of the show's DVDs
- "Bathtime", an episode of the television series The Simpsons shorts
- "Bathtime", an episode of the television series The Tracey Ullman Show
- "Bathtime", an episode of the television series Zoboomafoo

== Music ==
- "Bathtime", a song in the album Coliseu dos Recreios de Lisboa – October 30th, 2001
- "Bathtime", a song in the album Everything Grows
- "Bathtime", a song in the album Raffi in Concert with the Rise and Shine Band
- "Bathtime", a single by Tindersticks
- "Bathtime", a song in the album Toot, Toot!

== Other ==
- Bathtime, a book by Joy Berry in the Teach Me About book series

== See also ==
- Bath (disambiguation)
