= Baden (disambiguation) =

Baden (an obsolete German word for "Baths") is the western part of the German state of Baden-Württemberg, named for Baden-Baden, which was named for its hot springs.

Baden may also refer to:

== Places ==
=== Australia ===
- Baden, Tasmania, a locality in Tasmania

=== Austria ===
- Baden, Austria, also known as "Baden bei Wien" (Baden near Vienna)
- Baden District, Austria, a district of the state of Lower Austria in Austria

=== Canada ===
- Baden, Ontario

=== France ===
- Baden, Morbihan

=== Germany ===
- Baden-Baden, officially named "Baden" until 1931, a town located in the Black Forest, Baden-Württemberg, Germany
- Baden, Lower Saxony, a village near Bremen
- Margraviate of Baden, its subdivisions and successor states:
  - Margraviate of Baden (1112–1803), a historical territory of the Holy Roman Empire along the east side of the Upper Rhine River in southwestern Germany
    - Margraviate of Baden-Baden
    - Margraviate of Baden-Durlach
    - Margraviate of Baden-Hachberg
    - Margraviate of Baden-Rodemachern
  - Electorate of Baden (1803–1806)
  - Grand Duchy of Baden (1806–1918)
  - Republic of Baden (1918–1945), part of the Weimar Republic and Nazi Germany
  - Land Baden (1945–1952), the southern half of the former Republic of Baden, a subdivision of the French occupation zone of post-World War II Germany, after the previous states of Baden and Württemberg had been split up between the US and French occupation zones
  - Württemberg-Baden (1945–1952), a subdivision of the US occupation zone of post-World War II Germany
  - Baden-Württemberg, a federal state in modern Germany since 1952

=== Switzerland ===
- Baden, Switzerland, a town in Switzerland, also unofficially known as "Baden bei Zürich" (Baden near Zürich) or "Baden in Aargau"
- County of Baden, a condominium (1415–1798) of the Old Swiss Confederacy
- Canton of Baden, canton of the Helvetic Republic (1798–1803)
- Baden District, Switzerland, a district in the canton of Aargau, Switzerland

=== Ukraine ===
- Baden, Ukraine, a village in the Rozdilnianskyi Raion near Odesa

=== United States ===
- Baden, Maryland, a census-designated place in Prince George's County
- Baden, Pennsylvania, a borough in Beaver County
- Baden, St. Louis, Missouri, a neighborhood
- Baden Township, North Dakota, a township in Ward County
- Baden, the original name of South San Francisco, California

== People ==
- Allison Baden-Clay, an Australian woman who was murdered by her husband Gerard Baden-Clay in 2012
- Baden Powell (guitarist), Brazilian bossa nova guitarist
- Charlotte Baden, Danish writer
- Fred Baden, American politician; see Louisiana Political Museum and Hall of Fame
- Michael Baden, forensic pathologist and professional witness
- Robert Baden-Powell, 1st Baron Baden-Powell, founder of Scouting

== Ships ==
- SMS Baden (1880), a Sachsen-class of the German Imperial Navy
- SMS Baden, a Bayern-class of the German Imperial Navy during World War I
- FV Baden, a fishing trawler in service 1934-39, served as the vorpostenboote V 214 Baden and V 404 Baden during World War II

== Sport ==
- FC Baden, a Swiss football club based in Baden, Switzerland

== Other ==
- Baden culture, an archaeological culture of the late Eneolithic
- Baden School, Baden School of Neo-Kantians (also known as Southwest School)
- Treaty of Baden (1714), ending conflict between France and the Holy Roman Empire and the last treaty ending the War of the Spanish Succession
- Treaty of Baden (1718), ending conflicts among several Swiss cantons

== See also ==
- Baden Baden (disambiguation)
- Bath (disambiguation), the equivalent English placename
- Caspar A. Baaden (died 1918), New York politician
