= Baden District =

Baden District may refer to:

- Baden District, Austria, a district of the state of Lower Austria in Austria
- Baden District, Aargau, a district in the canton of Aargau, Switzerland

== See also ==
- Baden (disambiguation)
