= Joseph von Rudolphi =

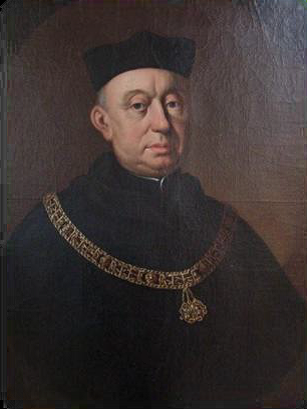
Joseph von Rudolphi

Joseph von Rudolphi, or Joseph von Rudolfi, (16 May 1666 – 7 March 1740) was the abbot and kitchen master of the Abbey of Saint Gall. He served from 1717 until his death.

== Early life ==
He was born Wolfgang Ernst to lieutenant colonel and imperial commander Johann Christoph von Rudolphi from Ljubljana and Maria Salome von Berneck. A Catholic, Joseph von Rudolphi joined the Saint Gall monastery school in 1683 and took his religious vows in 1685. On 30 March 1686, he received his minor orders. On 12 May 1688, he became subdeacon and on 18 September of the same year deacon. Von Rudolphi was made priest on 22 September 1690 and subcustos on 5 December 1691.

== Career ==
In different sources he is mentioned as a teacher of grammar, assistant kitchen master, Gastpater and subgranarius. On 18 January 1694, he was appointed kitchen master in Saint Gall, later on also in St. Johann and Rorschach. In 1707, von Rudolphi became Brüdermagister and he began to act as custos and confessor in Notkersegg in 1708. From 1712 onwards, he held the office of subprior. With the Abbot of Einsiedeln Abbey, Thomas Schenkli, as chairman, von Rudolphi was unanimously elected Abbot of Saint Gall in exile at Castle Neuravensburg in Allgäu on 16 December 1717 after the death of Abbot Leodegar Bürgisser. Pope Clement XI confirmed the new abbot on 27 April 1718. The benediction, performed by Bishop Johann Franz Schenk von Stauffenberg of Konstanz and the assisting Abbots of Einsiedeln and Mehrerau, was delayed until 24 June 1721.

=== Toggenburg war ===
After his election, the new abbot immediately tried to make peace. Thus, at the beginning of May 1718, six years after the end of the Toggenburg War, negotiations in Baden began. The peace contract contained 84 points and was signed on 15 June 1718. The contract that was ratified by the abbot was brought to Zurich and Bern on 6 August 1718 in order to be ratified there as well. However, Clement XI discarded the contract, which led to riots. Abbot von Rudolphi returned from exile to Rorschach on 7 September 1718. He began receiving homage in Toggenburg. On 11 October, he moved into Saint Gall and on 15 October, lections and the silentium as well as, a day later, the orthros could be reintroduced. Only on 23 March 1719 did the abbot receive a large part of the library that had been brought to Zurich at the beginning of the war. Other items belonging to the prey of the people of Bern, for instance eight bells and seven fire engines, arrived in Saint Gall on 5 May 1721.

=== Achievements ===
Von Rudolphi founded new parishes and divided Gossau and Oberriet. He introduced a new registry of documents to the archive of the monastery and let escape boxes be made. From 1719 to 1722, from 1724 to 1726, in 1730 and from 1735 to 1736, the abbot conducted visitations in order to gain an overview of local school conditions. On 8 and 9 May 1737, von Rudolphi organised a synod in Saint Gall. He ordered Caspar Moosbrugger in 1721 to draw a draft of the new minster. Von Rudolphi defined the exact border demarcations with the dominions adjoining Saint Gall.

On 29 April 1731, the abbot renewed the alliance with France that began in 1663. After several disputes in Toggenburg, abbatial magistrates Johann Baptist Keller and Niklaus Rüdlinger, who had formerly been leading the opposition against the abbey, were murdered on 8 December 1735. On 9 January 1739, the conference in Frauenfeld concerning the six places of arbitration (dt. "Schiedsorte") that was supported by France ended without result. Merchants and manufacturers were called together by the abbot to a conference in Rorschach on 11 March 1739 with the aim of discussing trade questions and the implementation of a trade and industry order, which was passed and evoked on 8 April of the same year. By means of thoughtful administration and economy, the abbot reduced the abbey's debts. On 21 September 1739, von Rudolphi expelled Konstanz's official Franz Andreas Rettich, who had been assigned by the bishop to visit the Saint Gall parishes, from the abbatial territory. This led to a renewed conflict with the Bishopric Konstanz concerning jurisdiction and visitation rights.
