= Rati Lines =

Rati Lines, also spelled as Reti Lines, is a neighborhood located near Bath Island, in the Clifton suburb of Karachi, Pakistan.

It is a low-income neighborhood which was first inhabited by gypsies in the late 1960s and since then has been inhabited by blue-collar workers, including domestic workers, security personnel, and drivers who work in the surrounding affluent areas of Clifton. The demographics of the neighborhood consist of mostly Pashtuns.

During the Indo-Pakistani war of 1971, two bombs were dropped on the Reti Lines area. The explosions caused major damage, demolishing a number of residential buildings, including houses and small makeshift dwellings.
