= Bath Historic District =

Bath Historic District may refer to:

- Bath Historic District (Bath, Maine), listed on the NRHP in Maine
- Bath Historic District (Bath, North Carolina), listed on the NRHP in North Carolina

== See also ==
- Bath (disambiguation)
- For the World Heritage Site, see Bath, Somerset
