= Baden Baden (disambiguation) =

Baden-Baden is a spa town in Baden-Württemberg, southwestern Germany

Baden Baden or Baden-Baden may also refer to:

- The Margraviate of Baden-Baden, a former state of the Holy Roman Empire centred on the spa town which was partitioned the Margraviate of Baden.
- Baden Baden, Illinois, a village better known as Pierron, Illinois
- Baden-Baden (horse), an American Thoroughbred racehorse best known for winning the 1877 Kentucky Derby
- Baden Baden (band), a French musical band
- Baden Baden (film), a 2016 film
- Baden Baden (brewery), a Brazilian microbrewery

== See also ==
- Baden Baden-Powell (1860–1937), military aviation pioneer, President of the Royal Aeronautical Society and a Fellow of the Royal Geographical Society
- Baden (disambiguation)
