= German trawler V 404 Baden =

German fishing trawler

History
- Name: Jakob Goldschmidt (1930–33); Baden (1933–45); Docteur Edmond Papin (1945–61)
- Namesake: Jakob Goldschmidt, Baden
- Owner: Hochseefischerei J. Wieting AG (1930–3439); Nordsee Deutsche Hochseefischerei Bremen-Cuxhaven AG (1934–39); Kriegsmarine (1939–45); Sociètè Française de Cabotage (1947–61)
- Operator: Owner operated except: Nordsee Deutsche Hochseefischerei Bremen-Cuxhaven AG (1930–34)
- Port of registry: (Weimar Republic) Nordenham Germany (1930–33); (Nazi Germany) Nordenham, Germany (1933–39); Kriegsmarine (1939–45); Bordeaux, France (1947–61); United Kingdom (1961–62)
- Builder: Schiffswerft von Henry Koch AG
- Yard number: 286
- Launched: June 1930
- Completed: July 1930
- Commissioned: 21 September 1939
- Decommissioned: May 1945
- Identification: Code Letters NKHS (1930–34); Fishing boat registration ON 145 (1930–34); Code Letters DNOV (1934-44); Fishing boat registration PG 480 (1934–39); Code Letters FPUW (1947–61)
- Fate: Scrapped

General characteristics
- Type: Fishing trawler (1930–39); Vorpostenboot (1939–44); Cargo ship (1947–62)
- Tonnage: 321 GRT, 126 NRT
- Length: 43.60 metres (143 ft 1 in)
- Beam: 7.40 metres (24 ft 3 in)
- Draught: 3.68 metres (12 ft 1 in)
- Depth: 4.28 metres (14 ft 1 in)
- Installed power: Triple expansion steam engine, 73nhp
- Propulsion: Single screw propeller
- Speed: 10 knots (19 km/h)

V 404 Baden was a German fishing trawler that was requisitioned by the Kriegsmarine during the Second World War for use as a vorpostenboot. She was built in 1930 as Jakob Goldschmidt and was renamed Baden in 1933. She served as V 214 Baden and V 404 Baden. Scuttled in 1944, she was raised post war and became the French cargo ship Docteur Edmond Papin. Sold to the United Kingdom in 1961, she was scrapped the next year.

== Description ==
The ship was 43.60 metres (143 ft 1 in) long, with a beam of 7.40 metres (24 ft 3 in). She had a depth of 4.28 metres (14 ft 1 in) and a draught of 3.28 metres (10 ft 9 in). She was assessed at 321 GRT, 126 NRT. She was powered by a triple expansion steam engine, which had cylinders of 37 centimetres (14 5/8 in), 57.9 centimetres (22 13/16 in) and 96.4 centimetres (37 15/16 in) diameter by 64.9 centimetres (25 9/16 in) stroke. The engine was built by the Ottensener Maschinenbau GmbH, Altona, Germany. It was rated at 73nhp. It drove a single screw propeller, and could propel the ship at 10 knots (19 km/h).

== History ==
Jakob Goldschmidt was built as yard number 286 by the Schiffswerft von Henry Koch, AG, Lübeck, Germany for the Hochseefischerei J. Wieting AG, Nordenham, Germany. She was launched in June 1930 and completed the next month. The fishing boat registration ON 145 was allocated, as were the Code Letters NKHS. She was operated under the management of the Nordsee Deutsche Hochseefischerei Bremen-Cuxhaven AG. In April 1933, she was renamed Baden. On 4 September 1930 her fishing boat registration was changed to PG 480 and on 10 November she was sold to her managers. During 1934, her Code Letters were changed to DNOV. She took part in Festungskriegsübung Swinemünde on 10 June 1937.

On 23 September 1939, Baden was requisitioned by the Kriegsmarine for use as a vorpostenboot. She was allocated to 2 Vorpostenflotille as V 214 Baden. On 21 October, she was transferred to 4 Vorpostenflotille as V 404 Baden. On 19 February 1943, she attacked and damaged the submarine USS Blackfish, which had sunk V 408 Haltenbank in the Bay of Biscay off Bilbao, Spain. On 26 August 1944, she was scuttled at Bordeaux, Gironde, France.

Baden was raised post-war, repaired and returned to service in 1947 as the French merchant ship Docteur Edmond Papin for the Sociètè Française de Cabotage, Bordeaux. The Code Letters FPUW were allocated. In 1961, she was sold to the United Kingdom. She was scrapped the next year.

== Sources ==
- Gröner, Erich (1993). Die deutschen Kriegsschiffe 1815-1945 (in German). Vol. 8/I: Flußfahrzeuge, Ujäger, Vorpostenboote, Hilfsminensucher, Küstenschutzverbände (Teil 1). Koblenz: Bernard & Graefe. ISBN 3-7637-4807-5.
