= Leodegar Bürgisser =

18th-century Christian abbot

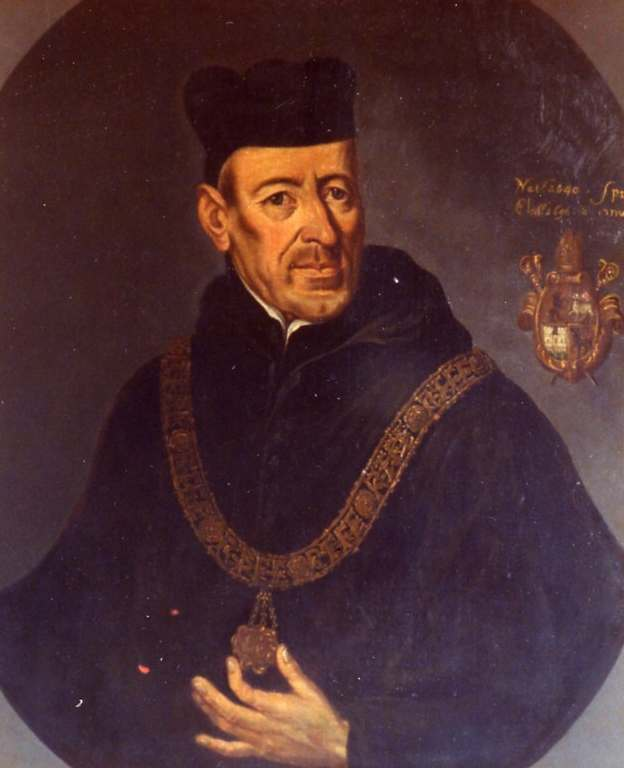
Leodegar Bürgisser

Leodegar Bürgisser (baptised Andreas; April 2, 1640 in Lucerne – November 28, 1717) was abbot of the Abbey of Saint Gall from 1696 to 1717.

== Life ==
Abbot Leodegar was the son of the baker Heinrich Bürgisser and of Anna Maria Wey. He received his education at the Jesuit College in Lucerne from 18 October 1651 and at the school in Saint Gall from 15 October 1653. He took his religious vows on 27 May 1657 and directly received the low consecrations; on 17 December 1661 he became subdeacon, on 19 May 1663 deacon, and on 20 September 1664 priest. In the following year (1665), he acted as a teacher of syntax. On 29 May of the same year, he became brother inspector. Between 1666 and 1672, Leodegar operated as kitchen master. In 1667, he is mentioned as pastor in Wildhaus; on 11 October 1672, he became pastor in St. Peterzell and in 1673, he is mentioned as pastor in Hemberg. On 26 September 1673, he became administrator in Ebringen. Abbot Gall appointed Leodegar subprior on 15 September 1681 and dean on 14 June 1683. In 1682, he moreover acted as confessor in Notkersegg and as pupils' prefect. With Cardinal Celestino Sfondrati and the Abbots Raphael von Einsiedeln and Plazidus von Muri as chairmen, Leodegar was elected abbot on 10 January 1696. Pope Innocent XII confirmed him on 18 June 1683. The benediction was given to him by Auxiliary bishop Franz Christoph Rinck von Baldenstein from Eichstätt, a brother of the Saint Gall estate overseer Wilhelm, on 4 November 1696. This was potentially a way to save money as the Bishop of Konstanz was compassed.

Emperor Leopold I confirmed the prerogatives to Leodegar on 13 August 1697, Emperor Joseph I on 22 November 1706 and Emperor Charles VI on 24 March 1713. As new abbot, Leodegar began receiving homage on 8 May 1696 in the Old Landscape (dt. "Alte Landschaft"), in Toggenburg and in the Rhine Valley.

He was on the run when he died of a heart failure in Neu-Ravensburg on 28 November 1717. He was entombed next to Abbot Kilian in the Abbey of Wettingen-Mehrerau.

== Works ==
Werner Vogler states that Abbot Leodegar's reputation would have been better, had he lived in more favourable times and been confronted with adversaries exhibiting a greater willingness to compromise. He would be called a very strenuous abbot as during his time the abbey was apparently characterised by immaculate discipline; Leodegar himself is said to have led an exemplary monastic life and his housekeeping was good. In times of peace, he also executed a general investiture and tried in vain to establish a higher school in Rorschach. Vogler sees the reason for Leodegar's bad reputation in the circumstances described below.

=== Conflicts ===
In the first instance, the denominational conflicts in Saint Gall reemerged because crosses had been carried during the procession through the city; this was a provocation to the Protestant citizens and initiated the so called Kreuzkrieg (en. "war of the cross"). It proceeded without bloodshed and could be settled during the Conference of Rorschach from 10 May to 8 June 1697. The conclusion of the conference was one year later complemented by the Tagsatzung with the verdict that the city had to pay the monastery 3800 fl. as satisfaction.

Probably in order to better protect himself, Abbot Leodegar concluded a defence contract with Emperor Leopold I in 1702 which enraged some of the Swiss.

When he made great purchases (17'700 gulden) in Toggenburg in order to buy property and the people of Wattwil refused to assist him in building the Rickenstrasse, lengthy conflicts with the Toggenburger ensued as they belonged to the other denomination and were unsatisfied with their legal status. Eventually, they occupied three castles and from April 1712 onwards also Magdenau Abbey and the Abbey Neu St. Johann. Zurich supported Toggenburg's attempts at freedom, which in truth circled around the inner constitution of Toggenburg, time and again, which led to the outbreak of war in 1712. The abbatial city of Wil was captured by the allied people of Zurich, Bern and Toggenburg, whereupon Abbot Leodegar fled, accompanied by his convent, from Rorschach into exile: first to Mehrerau and then to Castle Neu-Ravensburg, the centre of administration of a Saint Gall dominion north of Lindau. For the intervening time, he installed a Judicial vicar, namely Pastor Johann Georg Schenkli from Rorschach (1712–1718). The Zürcher and Berner, however, took the abbatial lands and conjointly governed them. Thereupon, the theft of mobile monastery goods took place which, as so-called Kulturgüterstreit, has consequences to this day.

As one of his last official acts, Abbot Leodegar discarded the peace that had been negotiated with Zurich and Bern in Rorschach on 28 November 1717; he beheld the rights of the abbey as largely restricted and the Catholic religion in Toggenburg as endangered.

His successor, Joseph von Rudolphi, negotiated the Peace of Baden in 1718.

== Reading list ==
- Dierauer, Johannes: Leodegar Bürgisser. in: Allgemeine Deutsche Biographie (ADB), Vol 3. Duncker & Humblot, Leipzig 1876, p. 606-7.
- Vogler, Werner: Kurzbiographien der Äbte. in: Johannes Duft, Anton Gössi, and Werner Vogler (eds.): Die Abtei St. Gallen. St. Gallen 1986, p. 168-89.
