= German trawler V 408 Haltenbank =

German fishing trawler

History
- Name: Haltenbank
- Owner: Norddeutsche Hochseefischerei AG. (1934–39); Kriegsmarine (1939–43)
- Port of registry: (Nazi Germany) Wesermünde, Germany (1934–39); Kriegsmarine (1939–43)
- Builder: Deschimag Seebeckwerft
- Yard number: 522
- Launched: September 1934
- Completed: 24 October 1934
- Commissioned: 20 September 1939
- Identification: Fishing boat registration PG 501 (1934–39); Code Letters DEZJ; Pennant number V 408 (1939–43)
- Fate: Sunk in the Bay of Biscay, 19 February 1943

General characteristics
- Type: Fishing trawler (1934–39); Vorpostenboot (1939–43)
- Tonnage: 444 GRT, 166 NRT
- Length: 51.35 m (168 ft 6 in)
- Beam: 8.00 m (26 ft 3 in)
- Draught: 4.65 m (15 ft 3 in)
- Depth: 3.74 m (12 ft 3 in)
- Installed power: Triple expansion steam engine, 128 nhp
- Propulsion: Single screw propeller
- Speed: 12 knots (22 km/h)

Haltenbank was a German fishing trawler that was requisitioned by the Kriegsmarine in the Second World War for use as a Vorpostenboot. She served as V 408 Haltenbank. She was torpedoed and sunk in the Bay of Biscay in February 1943.

== Description ==
The ship was 51.35 metres (168 ft 6 in) long, with a beam of 8.00 metres (26 ft 3 in). She had a depth of 3.74 metres (12 ft 3 in) and a draught of 4.5 metres (14 ft 9 in). She was assessed at 444 GRT, 166 NRT. She was powered by a triple expansion steam engine, which had cylinders of 35 centimetres (13 3/4 in), 55 centimetres (21 5/8 in) and 90 centimetres (35 7/16 in) diameter by 65 centimetres (25 9/16 in) stroke. The engine was made by Deschimag Seebeckwerft, Wesermünde, Germany. It was rated at 128nhp. The engine powered a single screw propeller driven via a low pressure turbine, double reduction gearing and a hydraulic coupling. It could propel the ship at 12 knots (22 km/h).

== History ==
The ship was built as yard number 522 by Deschimag Seekbeckwerft, Wesermünde for the Deutsche Hochseefischerei AG., Wesermünde. She was launched in September 1934 and completed on 24 October. The fishing boat registration PG 501 was allocated. She was allocated the Code Letters DEZJ.

Haltenbank was requisitioned by the Kriegsmarine on 20 September 1939 for use as a vorpostenboot. She was allocated to 4 Vorpostenflotille as V 408 Haltenbank. On 19 February 1943, she was torpedoed and sunk in the Bay of Biscay off Bilbao, Spain (43°29′00″N 2°57′30″W) by the United States Navy submarine USS Blackfish, which V 404 Baden counterattacked and damaged.

== Sources ==
- Gröner, Erich (1993). Die deutschen Kriegsschiffe 1815-1945 (in German). Vol. 8/I: Flußfahrzeuge, Ujäger, Vorpostenboote, Hilfsminensucher, Küstenschutzverbände (Teil 1). Koblenz: Bernard & Graefe. ISBN 3-7637-4807-5.
