= Celestino Sfondrati =

Italian Benedictine theologian

His Eminence Celestino Sfondrati O.S.B.
- Prince-Abbot of Saint Gall
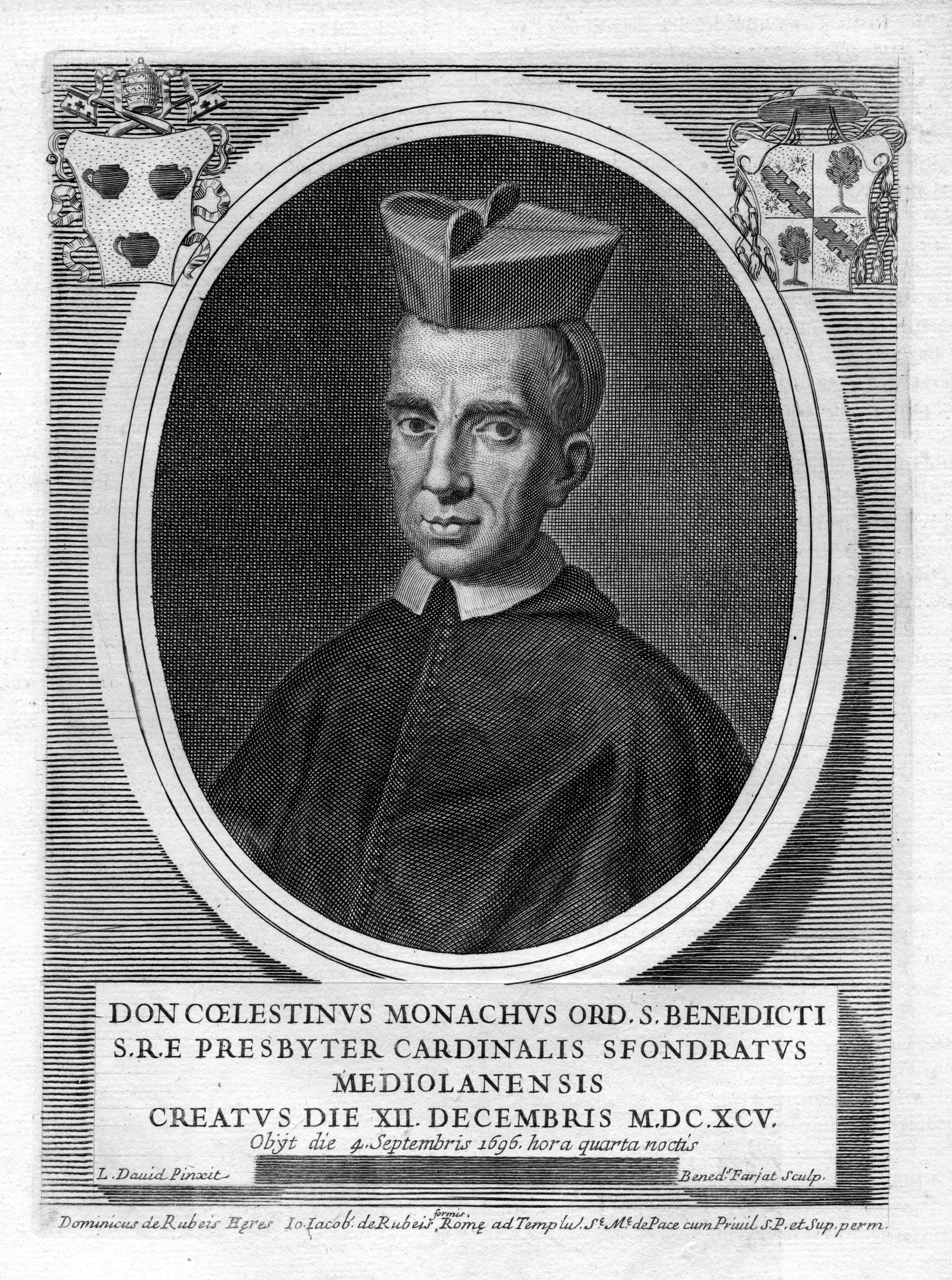
- Church: Catholic Church
- Appointed: 17 April 1687
- Term ended: 4 September 1696
- Predecessor: Gallus Alt
- Successor: Leodegar Bürgisser
- Other posts: Cardinal-Priest (1696)

Orders
- Created cardinal: 12 December 1695 by Pope Innocent XII
- Rank: Cardinal-Priest

Personal details
- Born: 10 January 1644 Milan, Italy
- Died: 4 September 1696 (aged 52) Rome, Papal States
- Buried: Santa Cecilia in Trastevere
- Coat of arms

Celestino Sfondrati (10 January 1644 – 4 September 1696) was an Italian Benedictine theologian, Prince-abbot of St. Gall and Cardinal.

== Life ==
Sfondrati was born in Milan. At the age of twelve, he was placed in the school at Rorschach, on the Bodensee, which was conducted by the Benedictines of St Gall, and on 26 April 1660, he took the Benedictine habit at St. Gall. When twenty-two years old, he already taught philosophy and theology at Kempten, and, after his elevation to the priesthood (26 April 1668), he became professor and master of novices at his monastery.

From 1679 to 1682, he taught canon law at the Benedictine University of Salzburg. In 1682, he returned to St. Gall to take charge of a small country church near Rorschach for a short time, whereupon Abbot Gallus appointed him his vicar-general.

In 1686 Pope Innocent XI created him Bishop of Novara, a dignity which he accepted only with reluctance. He was, however, prevented from taking possession of his see by being elected Prince-abbot of St. Gall on 17 April 1687.

His learning and piety, as well as his literary works in defence of the papal authority against the principles of Gallicanism, induced Pope Innocent XII to create him cardinal-priest on 12 December 1695, with the titular church of Santa Cecilia in Trastevere. But he had scarcely reached Rome when his health began to fail. He died at Rome, nine months after receiving the purple and was buried in his titular church.

== Works ==
His chief works are:

- "Cursus theologicus in gratiam et utilitatem Fratrum Religiosorum" (10 vols., St. Gall, 1670), published anonymously;
- "Disputatio juridica de lege in praesumptione fundata" (Salzburg, 1681; 2nd ed., Salem, 1718), a moral treatise against Probabilism;
- "Regale sacerdotium Romano Pontifici assertum" (St. Gall, 1684; 1693; 1749), published under the pseudonym of Eugenius Lombardus, a defence of the papal authority and privileges against the Four Articles of the Declaration of the French Clergy (1682);
- "Cursus philosophicus monasterii S. Galli" (3vols., St. Gall, 1686; 1695);
- "Gallia vindicata" (2 vols., St. Gall, 1688; 2nd ed., 1702), another treatise against Gallicanism, in particular against Maimbourg;
- "Legatio Marchionis Lavardini ejusque cum Innocentio XI dissidium" (1688), a short treatise concerning the right of asylum (les franchises) of the French ambassadors at Rome;
- "Nepotismus theologice expensus" (St. Gall, 1692);
- "Innocentia vindicata" (St. Gall, 1695; Graz, 1708), an attempt to prove that Thomas Aquinas held the doctrine of the Immaculate Conception;
- "Nodus praedestinationis ex sac. litteris doctrinaque SS. Augustini et Thomae, quantum homini licet, dissolutus" (Rome, 1697; Cologne, 1705), a posthumous work against the Jansenists, in which the author expounds the question of grace and predestination in the sense of Molina and the Jesuits. It called forth numerous rejoinders but found also many defenders (see Dunand in "Revue du Clergé Français", III (Paris, 1895), 316-26).

== Family ==
He belonged to the noble Milanese family of the Sfondrati, of which Cardinals Francesco Sfondrati and Paolo Sfondrati, and Pope Gregory XIV, were members.
