= The Bath =

The Bath may refer to:

- The Bath (play), a 1701 comedy play by Thomas d'Urfey
- The Bath (EP), by electronica duo Lemon Jelly
- The Child's Bath, a painting by Mary Cassatt (also known as The Bath)
- The Bath (short story), a short story by Raymond Carver
- "The Bath" (King Rollo), a 1980 TV episode
- Le Déjeuner sur l’herbe, originally titled Le Bain ("The Bath"), a painting by Édouard Manet

== See also ==
- Bath (disambiguation)
