= USS Blackfish =

Submarine of the United States

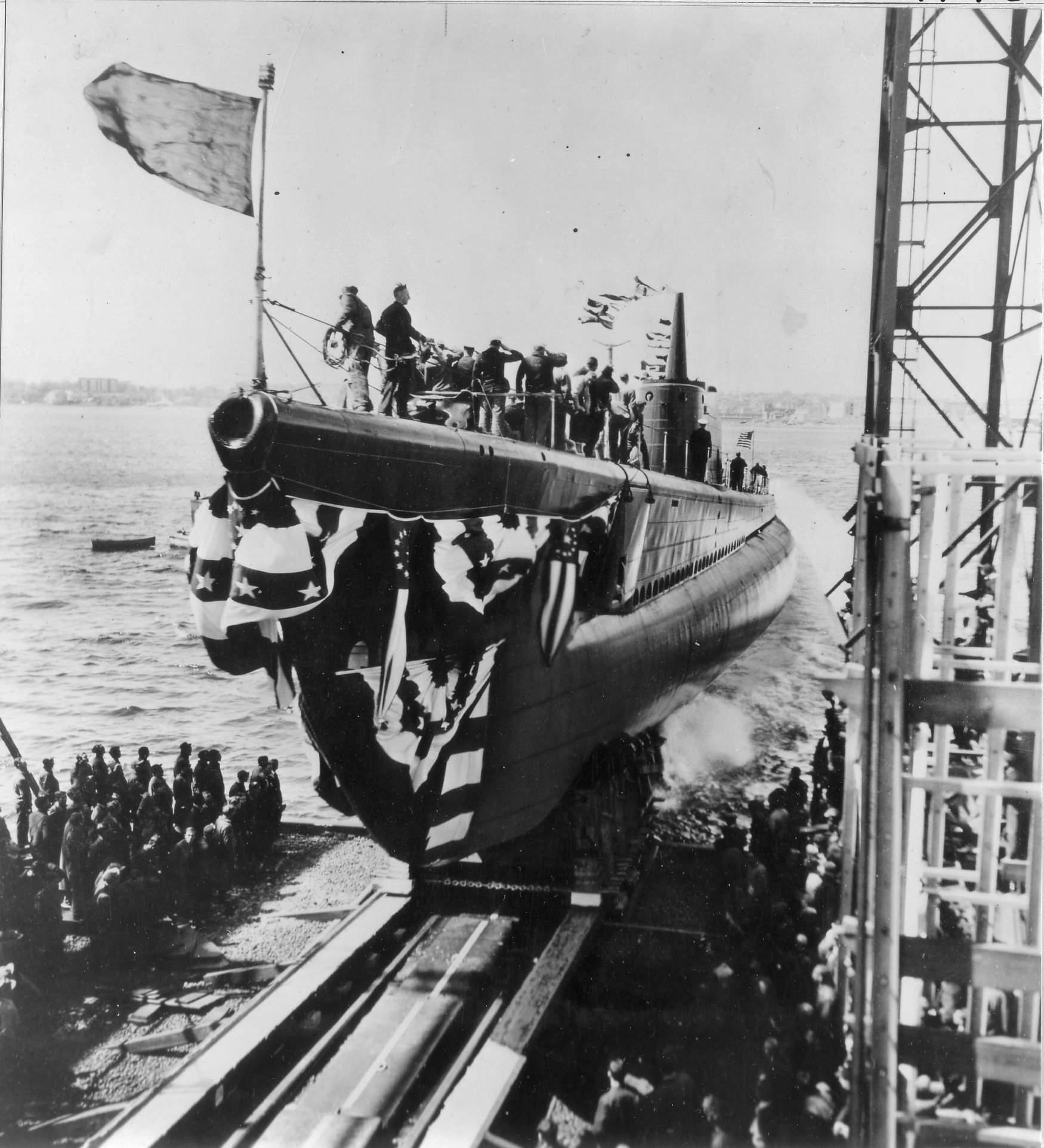
- The launch of USS Blackfish (SS-221) on 18 April 1942.

History

United States
- Builder: General Dynamics Electric Boat, Groton, Connecticut
- Laid down: 1 July 1941
- Launched: 18 April 1942
- Sponsored by: Mrs. Henry de F. Mel
- Commissioned: 22 July 1942
- Decommissioned: 11 May 1946
- In service: 5 May 1949 (non-commissioned)
- Out of service: 19 May 1955 (non-commissioned)
- Stricken: 1 September 1958
- Fate: Sold for scrap 4 May 1959

General characteristics
- Class & type: Gato-class diesel-electric submarine
- Displacement: 1,525 long tons (1,549 t) surfaced, 2,424 long tons (2,463 t) submerged
- Length: 311 ft 9 in (95.02 m)
- Beam: 27 ft 3 in (8.31 m)
- Draft: 17 ft (5.2 m) maximum
- Propulsion: 4 × General Motors Model 16-248 V16 Diesel engines driving electric generators; 2 × 126-cell Sargo batteries; 4 × high-speed General Electric electric motors with reduction gears; two propellers; 5,400 shp (4.0 MW) surfaced; 2,740 shp (2.0 MW) submerged
- Speed: 21 kn (39 km/h) surfaced, 9 kn (17 km/h) submerged
- Range: 11,000 nmi (20,000 km) surfaced @ 10 kn (19 km/h)
- Endurance: 48 hours @ 2 kn (3.7 km/h) submerged, 75 days on patrol
- Test depth: 300 ft (91 m)
- Complement: 6 officers, 54 enlisted
- Armament: 10 × 21-inch (533 mm) torpedo tubes; 6 forward, 4 aft; 24 torpedoes; 1 × 3-inch (76 mm) / 50 caliber deck gun; Bofors 40 mm and Oerlikon 20 mm cannon

USS Blackfish (SS-221), a Gato-class submarine in commission from 1942 to 1946, was the only ship of the United States Navy to be named for the blackfish. During World War II, she completed five war patrols in the Atlantic Ocean between October 1942 and July 1943 in waters extending from Dakar, Senegal, to the north of Iceland. She supported the Allied invasion of French North Africa in Operation Torch in November 1942, and is credited with sinking the German Vorpostenboot V 408 Haltenbank off the north coast of Spain in February 1943.

Later in 1943, Blackfish proceeded to the Southwest Pacific. Between 19 October 1943 and 14 August 1945, she completed seven war patrols in an area including the Solomon Islands, New Guinea, the South China Sea, the East China Sea, and the Yellow Sea. She sank one Japanese cargo ship of 2,087 gross register tons during her Pacific patrols. She completed her twelfth and final war patrol on 14 August 1945.

Decommissioned in 1946, Blackfish later served as a non-commissioned training ship for United States Naval Reserve personnel from 1949 to 1955. She was sold for scrapping in 1959.

== Construction and commissioning ==
Blackfish was laid down on 1 July 1941 at Groton, Connecticut, by the Electric Boat Company. She was launched on 18 April 1942, sponsored by Mrs. Ida H. Mel, wife of Captain Henry F. Mel, head of the Navy Purchasing Office in New York City. She was commissioned on 22 July 1942 with Commander Raymond W. Johnson in command.

== Service history ==
=== World War II ===
==== July–October 1942 ====
Following her commissioning Blackfish spent three months outfitting and training. She completed it in October 1942.

==== Atlantic operations ====
===== First war patrol =====
Assigned to Submarine Squadron 50 for operations under Commander, Naval Forces, Europe, Blackfish — now under the command of Lieutenant Commander J. F. Davidson — departed New England on 19 October 1942 to begin her first war patrol, shaping a course for French West Africa, where she was to conduct reconnaissance patrols off Dakar, Senegal, in support of Operation Torch, the Allied invasion of French North Africa. During her voyage across the Atlantic Ocean, she mostly ran submerged during daylight hours. On 5 November 1942, after 17 days in transit, she arrived at her assigned patrol station off Dakar.

Blackfish conducted her first full day of reconnaissance on 6 November 1942. During the morning hours, a heavy mist prevented her crew from making any good observations, but by the early afternoon, as visibility improved, the crew managed to take some photographs of the area. On 7 November 1942, Blackfish reconnoitered Dakar Point and Gorée Island, noting that at Point Manuel several buildings believed to be part of a naval base were under construction on reclaimed land in the area.

On 8 November 1942, Operation Torch began in earnest with Allied amphibious landings in French Morocco and Algeria. Blackfish continued her patrol of the Senegalese coast, on the lookout for Vichy French forces heading for French Morocco. Surface traffic in the area was light and Blackfish′s log reported some "doubt" as to whether it was “the best patrol area,” given that “A position south to southwest of Point Manuel offers the best opportunities for observing the harbor but very little chance of successful attack in case ships hug the coast.” The day concluded without Blackfish making contact with enemy forces.

Blackfish′s patrol proved significantly more eventful on 9 November 1942. While patrolling submerged 5 nautical miles (9.3 km; 5.8 mi) north of Pointe des Almadies, Blackfish sighted a Vichy French convoy of three cargo ships escorted by a destroyer. Once in range, she fired two torpedoes at each cargo ship and then prepared for a potential counterattack by the destroyer. Her torpedoes missed the first cargo ship, which Blackfish attributed to her torpedoes suffering a "loss of depth control." However, her second torpedo struck the second cargo ship, a 7,110-gross register ton vessel, abaft her stack and Blackfish′s sound operator reported that the ship's screw stopped. Meanwhile, the destroyer sped up and dropped a series of eight depth charges. Blackfish dove to 300 feet (91 m) and cleared the area to the northwest, running silently.

Following the action on 9 November 1942, Blackfish encountered few other particularly exciting events. On 12 November, her crew sighted a small trawler deemed too small for a torpedo attack. On the night of 12 November, she observed a peculiar flashing searchlight on Cape Verde Point that appeared to be making some type of signal. Nothing developed that evening, but on 13 November 1942, Blackfish patrolled the area again in case the light was signalling incoming convoys. Unfortunately for Blackfish, bad weather developed and visibility became severely limited, and in consequence she nearly collided with a previously undetected ship, which ultimately she did not identify. She dove prior to making contact and narrowly avoided a collision.

On 14 November 1942, Blackfish received word that her duty with Task Force 34 had concluded, and she headed for her primary patrol sector in the vicinity of Dakar. She continued her patrol with nothing of import occurring for the remainder of her time there. She eventually headed north, and on 26 November 1942 she rendezvoused with the Royal Navy Hunt-class destroyer HMS Lauderdale off The Lizard on the southwest coast of England and then steered toward Scotland. She moored to the dock at Rosneath, Scotland, on 27 November 1942 and began a refit. During her first war patrol, she traveled 7,673 nautical miles (14,210 km; 8,830 mi) and expended 74,258 US gallons (61,833 imp gal; 281,097 L) of fuel oil.

===== Second war patrol =====
Following her refit, Blackfish put back to sea, arriving in her patrol area in the Atlantic Ocean north of Spain off Punta de Estaca de Bares for her second war patrol on 27 December 1942. Over the course of about three weeks, she scoured the area in search of enemy activity. She encountered British forces, numerous fishing trawlers, and an occasional Spanish merchant ship, but no enemy forces in the course of her patrol. She returned to Rosneath, mooring there on 18 January 1943, thus ending her second war patrol with little to show for it other an account of a minor episode of laryngitis among her crew, a few photographs, and some intelligence on merchant ships and fishing vessels.

Blackfish remained at Rosneath in upkeep status for the rest of January 1943. She underwent minor repairs and established two shore leave periods, which afforded her crew at least five days of leave.

===== Third war patrol =====
On 1 February 1943, Blackfish got underway for her third war patrol, bound for a patrol area in the Bay of Biscay near Bilbao, Spain. She departed Rosneath in company with the Royal Navy destroyer HMS Shikari and the U.S. submarine USS Barb (SS-220). Shikari and Barb parted company with Blackfish on the morning of the 2 February. Over the course of the next several weeks while patrolling in her assigned area, she encountered a daily flurry of Spanish fishing and cargo vessels. On several occasions, she received notification of the passage of the Vichy French ships Winnetou, Livadia, and Nordfels steaming from Bilbao to Bordeaux, France. She was unable to engage any of them owing to an apparent effort by those ships to travel on days of low visibility and exceptionally bad weather conditions.

At 10:50 on 18 February 1943, Blackfish happened upon approximately 30 small fishing boats headed for Bermeo, Spain, and her log noted that the boats appeared to have sighted her. It may have very well been that sighting which prompted the events of the next day. At 17:40 on 19 February 1943, Blackfish observed two small vessels that appeared to be large fishing trawlers traveling in a column which did not display any Spanish colors. Blackfish′s commanding officer called the crew to general quarters and initiated an attack approach. The first ship's small bow made her difficult to make out, and several suspenseful minutes passed. At last, at 17:49, Blackfish clearly observed German colors and identified both ships as converted trawler-type submarine tender vessels with guns mounted fore and aft.

Blackfish fired two torpedoes from her bow torpedo tubes at the lead ship, and another two at the second. The second of the vessels, the disguised Vorpostenboot (patrol boat) V 408 Haltenbank, suffered a fatal hit by one of Blackfish′s torpedoes. Blackfish immediately was subjected to a depth-charge attack, as well as, according to her log, “something, which sounded like a bomb, but that did not produce much shock.” As she dove, five bombs and four depth charges exploded, the third of which reportedly detonated very close aboard and “jarred the ship considerably.” The blast had in fact cracked the conning tower door frame, which caused some minor flooding. Blackfish bottomed out in 368 feet (112 m) of water, then maintained total silence for a full hour. At 19:18, she cleared the area. Blackfish surfaced at 22:20, and her crew made some minor repairs while inspecting her for additional damage. Having taken an account of herself, Blackfish sent word of her damage and then continued her patrol.

Early on the morning of 20 February 1943, Blackfish received orders to return from patrol. She sped back to port and arrived safely in Falmouth, England, on 22 February 1943. In addition to the action that took place on 19 February, the patrol resulted in Blackfish′s keen observation that, according to her patrol report, “the traffic of Spanish ships east of Bilbao appears excessive considering that Pasajes is the only Spanish port. Although the ships are covered with Spanish flags and cruise very close inshore, it is almost certain that some are enemy ships, and that all of them are not going to Pasajes but are bound for some French port.”

Shortly after her return to England, Blackfish proceeded to the Royal Naval Dockyard at Devonport, England. She underwent repairs and testing there from 5 March to 4 April 1943.

===== Fourth war patrol =====
At 09:00 on 5 April 1943, Blackfish got underway for her fourth war patrol and headed for the waters of Inchmarnock at the northern end of the Sound of Bute in the Firth of Clyde on the coast of Scotland to perform practice approaches with the British patrol yacht HMS Breda. Gale-force winds, rain, and poor visibility hindered all training efforts, and by 15:00 Blackfish had shaped a new course, proceeding in company with the former French Navy minesweeper HMS La Capricieuse to Muckle Flugga in the Shetland Islands. On 7 April 1943 she parted company with La Capricieuse and made for the waters of Norway and Iceland.

Overall, the patrol was uneventful with the exception of some environmental challenges. With air temperatures remaining between 18 and 28 °F (−8 and −2 °C), a buildup of ice on Blackfish′s hull presented one of the more significant challenges of the voyage. In one instance the ice slowed her diving time by approximately two minutes while she tried to avoid an unidentified airplane.

On 14 April 1943, Blackfish believed she sighted a periscope roughly 1,500 yards (1,400 m) off her port bow, but a subsequent search revealed nothing. It was the first of several sightings that likely were false as, according to Blackfish′s log, "a certain amount of wreckage has been sighted from time to time and a piece of this may have been mistaken for a periscope." The crew also spotted some mines and observed a few airplanes, most of which were friendly, but ultimately, encountered no enemy ships.

Due to Blackfish′s position so far to the north and given the season, the consequent continual daylight made it possible Blackfish to conduct much of the patrol on the surface, and her crew believed that access to fresh air while surfaced made for better living conditions. In his reflections on the patrol Lieutenant Commander Davidson observed that "the excessive smoking and steaming of the main engines in cold weather is a very serious military hazard and an immediate remedy is considered vital." On 11 May 1943, Blackfish anchored at Lerwick, Scotland, and at 10:00 on 12 May again got underway. In short order she joined Barb and La Capricieuse, and the three vessels headed for Rosneath in company. Blackfish anchored at Rosneath on 14 May 1943, concluding her fourth war patrol.

===== May–June 1943 =====
From 14 May to 8 June 1943, Blackfish remained at Rosneath undergoing upkeep. During that time her crew received nine days of shore leave. On 2 June, she carried out local training, during which she conducted gunnery exercises and approaches with a British S-class submarine. On 3 June 1943, Blackfish returned to Rosneath.

===== Fifth war patrol =====
Blackfish′s fifth war patrol began on 8 June 1943 with her departure from Rosneath in company with Barb and the British patrol vessel HMS Cutty Sark. During the patrol, Blackfish spent long hours submerged with no exercise and limited food selection for her crew, which contributed to some illness among the crewmen. She sighted some merchant ships on 4 July 1943. On 5 July she received orders to return to the United States. She moored to Pier 15 at Naval Submarine Base New London in Groton, Connecticut, on 26 July 1943, concluding her fifth war patrol.

==== July–October 1943 ====
Upon her arrival at Groton, Blackfish underwent repairs, during which she replenished her supplies and her crew conducted training for their upcoming deployment to the Pacific for the war with Japan. With her repairs concluded, she set out for Brisbane, Australia. Upon reaching the Panama Canal Zone, she transited the Panama Canal and briefly conducted training in Panama Bay before continuing her journey. She arrived at Brisbane in September 1943 and spent three weeks undergoing a refit there.

==== Pacific operations ====
===== Sixth war patrol =====
On 19 October 1943, Blackfish set out on her first war patrol in the Pacific and sixth overall, headed for the waters around New Guinea, the Solomon Islands, and the Bismarck Islands. En route to her patrol area, she conducted multiple night radar training exercises on 20 October with her escort, the submarine rescue vessel USS Coucal (ASR-8). The two parted company on 24 October. At 05:13 on 26 October Blackfish arrived at Tulagi in the Solomon Islands and moored to an oil barge for fueling. On 27 October 1943, she rejoined her escort and got underway again at 06:00.

While assigned to a scouting line on 3 November 1943, Blackfish was on the surface when she encountered a Japanese convoy of two merchant ships, which her crew estimated at approximately 4,000 to 6,500 gross register tons, escorted by one patrol boat. Because Blackfish was patrolling along a scouting line, there was some question as to whether or not she should attack and give away the scouting line′s position to the Japanese. Davidson noted that "after reading and re-reading my orders, I decided I had no choice but to let them go by in order not to disclose the position of the scouting line." Blackfish dove and the convoy passed unharmed. In Davidson′s words, the incident was "pretty hard to take, after five patrols without a legitimate target."

On 4 November 1943, Blackfish suddenly sighted a large Japanese convoy escorted by several planes. Upon sighting the aircraft, she dove and a depth charge exploded nearby, but she escaped unscathed. On 6 November, she moved to a new patrol line north of Mussau Island in the St Matthias Islands. On 7 November at 11:05, an Imperial Japanese Navy floatplane attacked her and forced her to dive, Blackfish′s log noting that the floatplane apparently was "trying to get in a rain squall to work on us at his leisure." She remained submerged for several hours, over the course of which she heard 14 aircraft bombs and depth charges explode overhead. Davidson later received information that a large Japanese convoy had been moving through the area at the time.

On 11 November 1943, Blackfish stalked a Japanese destroyer, but the submarine USS Drum (SS-228) attacked first. Each missed opportunity to strike the enemy hit hard at the heart of the crew. After another frustrated attack opportunity on 14 November 1943, Davidson lamented that "a submariner's dream almost came true. I guess I don't live right."

Blackfish′s luck turned when she sighted a Japanese convoy on 22 November 1943. She trailed the column of ships and patiently waited to assume a proper attack position. At 11:21, she dove in preparation for an attack. Twenty minutes passed before she suddenly heard several explosions, which her crew believed to be depth charges, and the Japanese convoy changed course and disappeared. The convoy's escorts had been attacking Drum, which was nearby.

Blackfish regained contact with the convoy and continued following it into the evening of 22 November 1943. While on the surface at 00:06 on 23 November 1943, she fired a spread of six torpedoes at the 4,500-gross register ton cargo ship No. 2 Yamato Maru at 02°27′N 140°06′E. Davidson felt certain that at least three of the torpedoes hit their mark. The attack instantly alerted the escorting submarine chasers, which converged on Blackfish. She quickly dove. The convoy's escorts pursued Blackfish for nearly 40 minutes, but in the end she outran them.

Blackfish resumed her pursuit of the convoy and sighted its smoke at approximately 11:11 on 23 November 1943. Davidson observed that there was one less ship present in the convoy, which led him to believe that Blackfish had in fact sunk one of the cargo ships in the previous attack. Blackfish began an attack approach but the escorts detected her some 4,000 yards (3,700 m) off and forced her to withdraw.

Blackfish continued to track the convoy well into 24 November 1943. She reached an attack position at 23:08 on 24 November and launched a spread of six torpedoes at the stern of an unidentified cargo ship in the Japanese column located at 00°56′N 144°52′E. Blackfish′s crew heard five explosions between three and four minutes after firing, but could make no observation of the resulting damage because the convoy's escorts quickly closed in. They pursued Blackfish for a full 30 minutes, but at length she escaped unharmed.

Blackfish sighted a Japanese convoy on 26 November 1943 and then shortly thereafter lost track of it in a rain squall. She reacquired the convoy a few hours later, but as she assumed an attack position on the surface, one of the convoy's submarine chasers attempted to engage her, forcing her to dive. Over the course of several hours Blackfish endured a sonar-guided attack by more than 20 depth charges. Davidson observed that Blackfish′s rudder was exceedingly loud, and he believed that the Japanese ability to locate Blackfish was directly related to her inability to keep quiet. Following a prolonged siege, the Japanese broke off their attack and Blackfish resumed her patrol.

Blackfish left her patrol area on 28 November 1943. She stopped off at Tulagi for fuel on 1 December 1943, and on 4 December she made contact with her escort aircraft. She then proceeded to Milne Bay on the eastern tip of New Guinea, where she completed her sixth war patrol after 46 days at sea, 32 of them in Japanese-controlled waters. With her crew in high spirits, she underwent a standard two-week refit at Milne Bay.

Blackfish′s patrol was deemed "successful" and her crew was authorized to wear the Submarine Combat Patrol Insignia. As Blackfish′s first war patrol in the Pacific Theater, it served as a learning experience for both her commanding officer and her crew. Although Blackfish had attempted both of her primary attacks on Japanese convoys at excessive range, her commanding officer and crew "benefited greatly from the experience and will undoubtedly inflict greater damage to the enemy on the next patrol," according to a post-patrol assessment of her performance.

During her refit, Blackfish had a 5-inch (127 mm) gun installed forward and her noisy rudder was fixed. Meanwhile, her crew spent two weeks at a military recreation camp on the beach for rest and relaxation, which included, among other things, horseshoes, volleyball, and swimming. During Blackfish′s third week at Milne Bay, her crew′s retreat ended, and she began an intensive training program under the supervision of Submarine Division 82.

===== Seventh war patrol =====
Esorted by Coucal and in company with the submarine USS Redfin (SS-272), Blackfish set out from Milne Bay on her seventh war patrol on the morning of 25 December 1943. Shortly after conducting some drills on 25 December, it became apparent that her radar needed repairs, which forced Blackfish to return to Milne Bay on 26 December. With repairs completed by 19:15 on 26 December, Blackfish put back to sea and hurried to rejoin Redfin and Coucal at Point Mast. On 27 December, Blackfish participated in training and drills with Coucal and Redfin, then at 13:59 the three vessels charted a course for Tulagi. They arrived at Tulagi on 28 December and awaited further orders. For the next several days Blackfish patrolled in the local area, occasionally docking at Tulagi. On two separate occasions several U.S. Navy officers came aboard to witness a series of what were called "special radio tests." On 31 December 1943, Blackfish escorted the submarine chaser USS SC-728 to Point White, a task she completed without incident.

While conducting regular patrols in her area of the Solomon Islands from 3 to 5 January 1944, Blackfish experienced a bout of extremely foul weather which made a noticeable impact on her operations, prompting Davidson to remark that the "swells were the biggest I have seen in this area." On 5 January, Blackfish sighted two Japanese cargo ships, but due to the weather she shortly thereafter lost contact with them. At 12:00 on 6 January, with the weather slightly improving, she detected a Japanese convoy and began tracking it. Approximately an hour later she received a radio call to help the submarine USS Balao (SS-285), but Balao was roughly 200 nautical miles (370 km; 230 mi) away, so Davidson opted to maintain contact with the convoy. Blackfish continued to track the convoy through the night, hoping to get a clear shot by daylight.

With the convoy′s smoke in sight, Blackfish dove at 08:40 on 7 January 1944 and prepared to attack. Unfortunately for Blackfish, the convoy′s low speed and zigzagging thwarted her attempts at getting a clear shot. As the opportunity faded, Davidson remarked "our last hope was one of the patrolling destroyers, which we managed to close to 3,000 yards (2,700 m) but without a very good set[-]up because of the constant changes of course and speed.” Given the circumstances, Blackfish pulled back. During the early morning hours of 8 January, one of the destroyers in the convoy came within sight again and Blackfish turned toward her on the surface and put all four of her diesel engines "on the line" to get into an attack position. A rain squall intervened and obscured the destroyer, however, and no attack developed. As the rain passed, the convoy — consisting of a small tanker of approximately 4,500 gross register tons, two cargo ships of about 4,500 gross register tons, and two destroyers — came into clearer view. Persistent rain caused further sight and sound issues which delayed any chances of an attack. Believing she had the leader of the column in sight and having finally gained a good position as the convoy emerged from the rain, Blackfish fired six torpedoes. Anticipating a quick reprisal, she dove to 300 feet (91 m). The Japanese began a depth-charge attack. Blackfish survived, but ultimately could not determine if she had made any successful hits against the convoy. After evading the escorts, Blackfish resumed her patroll.

Between 9 and 14 January 1944, Blackfish′s patrols proved relatively uneventful, but on the evening of 15 January she began tracking a Japanese convoy. Unfortunately for Blackfish, her radar went out and the ships disappeared. Nonetheless, Davidson moved to head them off the next day. At midday on 16 January, Blackfish sighted smoke and closed in. The convoy appeared to consist of a cargo ship of about 6,000 gross register tons, one small tanker of about 4,500 gross register tons, and an escorting destroyer. Blackfish launched an attack, but the convoy's low speed and zigzag forced Davidson to “fire down the throat" of the cargo ship and then fire "an angle shot from the stern." Blackfish fired all six of her bow tubes, and her second torpedo hit its target; her cfrew heard several explosions. Meanwhile, the Japanese destroyer approached Blackfish at high speed. Blackfish dove rapidly to escape from the area, but before she departed her crew observed the 2,087-gross register ton Kaika Maru rolling over on her starboard side; 27 of the 102 passengers aboard Kaika Maru perished in the sea. Davidson believed he sank the other merchant ship as well, but it was in fact only damaged. Blackfish weathered a barrage of depth charges that lasted from 16:56 until 20:13. In contemplating the lengthy Japanese counterattack, Davidson observed "I don′t know whether it was a coincidence or not, but every time we made any noise at all the destroyer would drop one or two more on us.” Blackfish and her crew endured 43 depth charges in total, but eventually she shook off the pursuing destroyer by heading into a heavy rain squall.

Blackfish patrolled from 17 to 23 January 1944 with little to report other than some bad weather. Late on the evening of 24 January she received orders to shape a course for Tulagi, where she arrived at around 05:45 on 28 January, moored, and fueled. That same day, Davidson proceeded to nearby Guadalcanal for a special duty assignment with Commander, Task Force 31. After he returned, a party of six officers and two enlisted men and their equipment embarked and Blackfish got underway to Point White. On 30 January, the radar went out again, and the persistent problems with the radar notably shook Davidson's confidence in the equipment.

While in her patrol zone in the early morning of 3 February 1944, Blackfish sighted smoke and subsequently discovered a Japanese convoy consisting of two medium-sized merchant ships, two Fubuki-class destroyers, and one other unidentified escort of approximately 1,000 displacement tons. Having assumed a good position around 09:49, Blackfish fired a spread of six torpedoes at a distance of 1,600 yards (1,500 m) and immediately "went deep." Two of the Japanese escorts began using sonar and dropped some 14 depth charges. Following the attack, Blackfish remained submerged throughout the night of 3–4 February 1944, due primarily to the proximity of nearby Japanese air bases.

Patrolling continued without any excitement through 7 February 1944. On 8 February, Blackfish arrived at Tulagi. She set out again on 9 February on the last leg of her patrol. On 13 February she sighted Cape Moreton Light, and shortly thereafter on the same day arrived at New Farm Wharf in Brisbane, Australia, ending her 49-day patrol, 31 days of which were spent in a combat area. Despite poor weather, a "groaning" rudder, and numerous leaks, Blackfish had managed to attack three Japanese convoys, as well as perform a special mission. The patrol was deemed "successful" and worthy of the Submarine Combat Patrol Insignia. At Brisbane, Blackfish underwent a two-week refit, during which she had a new SJ radar installed.

===== Eighth war patrol =====
On 22 February, Lieutenant Commander Robert F. Sellars assumed command of Blackfish, and on 1 March 1944 she put to sea, commencing her eighth war patrol. She stopped first at Milne Bay from 6 to 9 March, where she conducted training and took on fuel and provisions. Then on 10 March she headed for her patrol area in company with the submarine USS Bashaw (SS-241). She arrived in her patrol area on 17 March 1944.

On 30 March 1944, Blackfish encountered a Japanese convoy and her crew manned their battle stations in preparation for an attack. At 1,800 yards (1,600 m), she fired a salvo of torpedoes from her port track, intending to sink the 6,700-gross register ton merchant ship Ryuyo Maru. Unfortunately for Blackfish, the torpedoes passed under Ryuyo Maru′s keel. Blackfish dove, expecting a depth-charge attack, but the convoy′s escorts did not give chase. Due to a lack of fuel, Sellars decided to break off the attack.

Blackfish received orders on 6 April 1944 to proceed to Seeadler Harbor on Manus Island in the Admiralty Islands. She arrived there on the 8 April, moored to the port side of the tanker USS Mink (IX-123) and fueled. The turnaround proved quick, and she put back out to sea at 21:25 the same day. Once back in her patrol area she spotted numerous planes but few ships. Blackfish had a close call with her eponym on 12 April, when, according to her log, some “suspicious-looking objects were spotted 7,000 yards [6,400 meters] from the ship,” and a subsequent, investigation revealed that the objects in question were in fact “several large blackfish.”

As April 1944 continued, so did the patrol, with little excitement. On 15 April 1944, Blackfish conducted a reconnaissance of Merir in the Palau Islands. A brief investigation observed a Japanese transport plane making signals to the inhabitants of the island but nothing else came of it. Continued patrolling over the course of the next week revealed consistent plane activity but almost no ships in the area. In one briefly exciting moment on 21 April, a plane caught Blackfish somewhat off guard and dropped a small bomb on her, but she emerged unscathed. On 26 April 1944, Blackfish received orders to perform lifeguard duty for Allied airstrikes, then report to Pearl Harbor, Hawaii, for lifeguard duty. Accordingly, she departed her patrol area.

While en route to her lifeguard station on 27 April 1944, Blackfish encountered a Japanese convoy. The ensuing pursuit resulted in several hours of constant maneuvering. Sellars marveled that although the Japanese ships "can see fairly plainly through the mist," they did not take notice of Blackfish′s presence during the chase. He concluded that they did not have radar, and having gained an advantageous position he gave the order to fire four torpedoes at one of the ships ay an approximate distance of 3,170 yards (2,900 m). Following the launch, a large cloud of black smoke appeared over the target. The convoy's escort and the ship Blackfish had targeted then faded out of view. Blackfish scoured the waters for nearly an hour but did not locate any of the ships.

Numerous plane sightings over the next several days forced Blackfish to remain submerged for long periods of time. On 2 May 1944, she slightly shifted her patrol zone and began searching the waters between Yap and Palau for possible shipping. On 4 May she shifted over to her lifeguard duties, and her log noted with some surprise that "no planes have been sighted since the first day in this area." On 6 May, Blackfish departed the area to proceed to Pearl Harbor, arriving there on 19 May 1944, concluding her eighth war patrol.

Blackfish′s eighth patrol was one of the longest made by any submarine during World War II, having lasted a total of 80 days. Despite the prolonged time at sea, the patrol had also produced little damage to Japanese shipping, although Blackfish had conducted her lifeguard and reconnaissance missions, and the patrol was deemed "successful" and worthy of the Submarine Combat Patrol Insignia. In his patrol report, Sellars observed that "a submarine should not be left on patrol for too long a period. This was brought home to us by the fact that the efficiency of all hands decreases rapidly after the fifty-day period. The lookouts, particularly, involuntarily slacked up, as shown by the bombings from planes, which came from directly overhead," and furthermore that "the boys were very tired."

===== May–September 1944 =====
After taking on provisions at Pearl Harbor, Blackfish departed on 21 May 1944 and arrived at Bethlehem Steel Corporation's Submarine Repair Base at San Francisco, California, on 27 May. Her crew went ashore for leave while she underwent a three-month overhaul. After its completion, and with 24 new crew members embarked, she set out from San Francisco on 31 August 1944, shaping a course for Pearl Harbor. She arrived there on 7 September 1944 and spent several days conducting independent exercises.

===== Ninth war patrol =====
For her ninth war patrol, Blackfish operated as part of a submarine wolfpack designated Task Group 17.11. The wolfpack also included the submarines USS Seadragon (SS-194) and USS Shark (SS-314), with Shark′s commanding officer in overall command. Blackfish began the patrol on 23 September 1944, departing Pearl Harbor and heading for Saipan in the Mariana Islands in company with Seadragon and Shark. The three submarines entered the harbor at Saipan on 3 October 1944, and Blackfish moored alongside the submarine tender USS Holland (AS-3) there. Early on the morning of 4 October, the wolfpack set out for its patrol area but quickly encountered several problems. First, a typhoon crossed the wolfpack′s track, then Shark began to experience electrical problems. On 5 October, the task group entered the eastern end of the Saipan safety lane, and where Shark resolved her electrical issues. The three submarines remained in the area during the night of 5–6 October 1944 to wait out the storm.

The three submarines departed the Saipan safety lane on 6 October 1944 amid force 8 winds and seas. Several times, green water broke over her bridge, causing seawater to flood through her conning tower hatch. Her crew at first bailed out the conning tower with buckets, then rigged a canvas water scoop which directed the water from the lower conning tower hatch into the large drain in the control room deck. Blackfish also experienced several 50-degree rolls and a great deal of sea sickness among her crew. The typhoon continued on 7 October, Sellars commenting that the waves “are still mountainous, 50 to 60 feet [15 to 18 meters] with gale winds of 60 to 70 knots [111 to 130 km/h; 69 to 81 mph]." Blackfish pressed on and reached her patrol area on the morning of 8 October 1944, at last finding calm seas there.

Blackfish′s patrol was quiet until 12 October 1944, when she made contact with a Japanese Minekaze-class destroyer. At 22:39, when dead ahead of the destroyer, Blackfish fired four torpedoes from her stern tubes. To Sellars’ astonishment, all four missed. Oddly, the attack also did not result in any retaliation from the destroyer. Blackfish continued to stalk the destroyer, and just after midnight on 13 October fired at it again. This attack also failed, and moments later Blackfish secured from battle stations. Both disgusted and mystified by the misses, Sellars decided it prudent to refrain from "wasting" more torpedoes on the destroyer and Blackfish returned to her patrol area empty handed.

On 14 October 1944, about half of Blackfish′s crew became seriously ill when she surfaced, and this problem began to repeat itself every day. Otherwise, five uneventful days followed the failed attack on the destroyer, and on 19 October 1944 Blackfish shifted her patrol area, reaching her new area on 20 October. The daily sickening of the crew upon surfacing persisted, and no cause for the condition could be determined; some crewmen speculated that it was from the air, a test of which indicated the presence of only one percent carbon dioxide, well within safety limits. On 21 October 1944, Shark and Seadragon reported a significant engagement with Japanese ships. Blackfish was trailing the action, but upon surfacing more of the crew became sick and Sellars remarked that the "situation is assuming major proportions." On 22 October, it was determined that 90% of the crew had been sickened, with a number of the cases being quite serious. In addition to the sickened crew, an inordinate amount of radio traffic coming across the frequency — a result of Task Groups 17.11, 17.14, and 17.15 operating in the same area — impaired Blackfish′s communications.

By 25 October 1944, a majority of Blackfish′s crew had regained their health, with only a few lingering cases, and Shark and Seadragon reported that they were out of torpedoes due to the numerous attacks they had executed in the preceding weeks. In Shark′s absence, Blackfish took temporary command of the task group. Early in the morning of 27 October 1944, she sighted three Japanese destroyers, but unspecified extenuating circumstances prevented her from attacking them. At 18:23 that day, she spotted several other Japanese ships, but poor positioning prevented the contact from developing into an attack, much to the disappointment of Sellars and his crew.

Blackfish shifted her patrol area again, heading to an area in the Philippine Sea east of the Batan Islands and northeast of Luzon in the Philippine Islands, where she arrived on 29 October 1944. She spotted a small ship on 30 October, but had no other contacts. On 1 November 1944, she again changed her patrol area, to an area in the South China Sea west of Cape Bojeador, the northwestern tip of Luzon. She sighted Cape Bojeador Lighthouse on 2 November and moved to the east, scouring the coast, but located nothing of interest. On 3 November, the sea was flat and calm and there was a cloudless sky, but still Blackfish sighted no ships. Desperate not to "go home empty handed, Sellars requested a five-day extension to the patrol.

Blackfish passed between Calayan Island and Dalupiri Island in the Babuyan Islands on 6 November 1944, and while she sighted no ships, she did spot some "campfires and lights in the island hills." She patrolled without further developments for several more days and a typhoon ravaged the area on 10 November, effectively ended the crew's hopes of making any attacks before the end of the patrol. With the seas calming on 11 November, Blackfish departed her patrol area. She arrived at Saipan on 17 November, took on fuel and supplies there, and then headed for Midway Atoll in the Northwestern Hawaiian Islands, where she arrived on 24 November 1944 after suffering from flooding en route.

Upon Blackfish′s arrival at Midway Atoll, two empty one-US-gallon (0.83 imp gal; 3.8 L) cans of carbon tetrachloride with loose lids were found on board, which indicated that the sickness that afflicted her crew during her patrol likely resulted from lead poisoning caused by exposure to carbon tetrachloride fumes. Sellars noted in his final report on the patrol that "this again emphasizes the fact that carbon-tetrachloride should not be carried on board submarines."

As a whole, Blackfish′s ninth war patrol was judged ineligible for the award of the Submarine Combat Patrol Insignia. Due to the flooding which occurred during her return from patrol, she required a refit at Midway Atoll. After it was completed on 23 December 1944, she conducted training until 29 December 1944.

===== Tenth war patrol =====
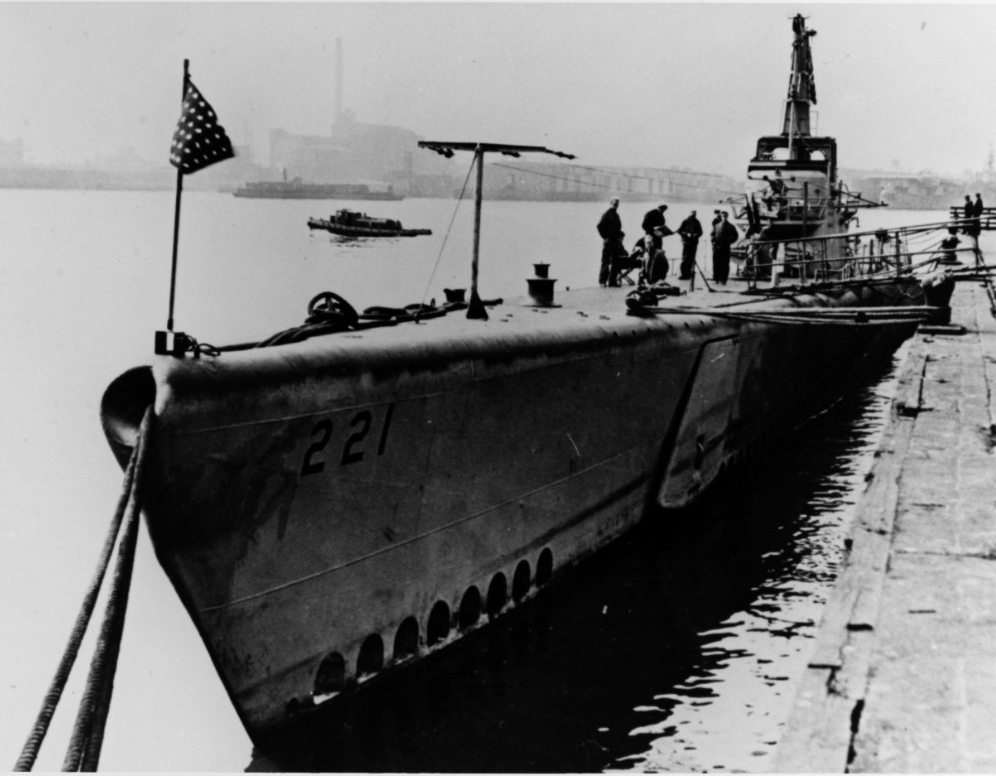
USS Blackfish (SS-221) in 1945.

Blackfish departed Midway Atoll on 1 January 1945 to begin her tenth war patrol, bound for a patrol area in the Luzon-Formosa area in the South China Sea. She undertook the patrol as a unit of Task Group 17.16, a wolfpack nicknamed "Joe's Jugheads" which also included the submarines USS Archerfish (SS-311) and USS Batfish (SS-310), with Archerfish′s commanding officer designated as the wolfpack commander. On 7 January, Blackfish made contact with Batfish, and the two of them shaped a course for Guam in the Mariana Islands. On 9 January they arrived at Guam, and Blackfish moored there to the port side of the submarine tender USS Sperry (AS-12). On 10 January 1945, with Blackfish′s voyage repairs complete and Archerfish having joined the group, the three submarines departed Guam for their patrol area. Blackfish made landfall at Batan Island in the Philippine Islands north of Luzon on 16 January 1945 amid rough seas and low viability.

On 17 January 1945, a large wave struck Blackfish, causing a significant amount of water to pour through her conning tower hatch into her conning tower, but she carried on despite the flooding. On 18 January, she conducted lifeguard duties in the area in support of U.S. airstrikes. In the late afternoon that day, she spotted a Japanese sampan. Sellars considered firing two torpedoes at the sampan, but ultimately decided against it because of the improbability of getting an accurate shot and because he did not want to give away Blackfish′s position in the area. While searching for downed aviators on 19 January 1945, Blackfish sighted several other small Japanese sailing ships, but Sellars again decided not to attack them because of similar considerations, and because bad weather made a successful attack unlikely.

While Blackfish moved through calm seas on 23 January 1945, she sighted a small Japanese vessel. She attempted to open fire on it with her 4-inch (102 mm) guns at a range of 600 yards (550 m), but the guns misfired. Blackfish brought her 20-millimeter guns and .50-caliber machine guns to bear and scored several damaging hits before leaving the area at high speed. During her high-speed withdrawal, her main electric motor burned out, and rough seas over the next several days prevented its repair until 25 January 1945.

Blackfish cruised near Hong Kong on 28 January 1945 and spotted numerous junks and small fishing trawlers. Sellars noted that he believed "many of these trawlers and junks may be Chinese in this particular area," but "the actions of these vessels do not indicate peaceful fishing. They patrol in pairs...fishing seems to be their secondary occupation. Undisputedly they are fishing for the Jap[anese], if fishing at all. We will shoot them all if we can.” During the early morning hours of 30 January 1945, Blackfish made an approach on two large sampan-type vessels. At 02:18, she launched two torpedoes, both of which appeared to hit, but no explosions resulted. Blackfish′s crew manned her guns, and at 04:35 trained all of them on the nearest sampan. Although the 4-inch (102 mm) guns again failed to fire, the 20-millimeter gun and .50-caliber machine guns riddled the sampan, causing its sails to collapse and its masts to fall. Blackfish left the sampan in a sinking condition with its decks awash, then shifted her attention to the second sampan, which opened all her sails in the hope of escaping. Blackfish closed to 600 yards (550 m) and opened fire while circling the sampan, which in desperation attempted to ram Blackfish. After 10 minutes of firing the 50-caliber machine guns overheated and the 20-millimeter gun jammed, so Blackfish retired from the battle to work on her guns.

On 1 February 1945 Blackfish again engaged a group of similar ships. The skirmish began just after moonrise when she approached several sampans and trawlers traveling in pairs. In the ensuing firefight, she sank at least three ships and damaged eight others with 4-inch (102 mm), 20-millimeter, and 50-caliber fire. The sampans retaliated with small arms fire, which had little to no effect on Blackfish. During the firefight, Blackfish′s radar picked up three large surface vessels approaching, so she quickly vacated the area.

On 2 February 1945, Blackfish reported the previous day's action, then received orders to join another wolfpack also consisting of the submarines USS Plaice (SS-390) and USS Scabbardfish (SS-397). As of 3 February she was headed for the Luzon Strait. On 4 February, she received word that the sampan she attacked might have been Chinese, to which Sellars responded that he "considered that possibility each time before shooting but with return fire, attempts to ram, regular patrol in pairs, and non-junk-like hulls, the enemy indications overruled."

Blackfish spent the remainder of her time on station patrolling and conducting lifeguard duties. She departed her patrol area in company with Batfish on 17 February 1945 and shaped a course for Apra Harbor on Guam. She arrived there on 21 February 1945 and moored to the port side of the submarine tender USS Proteus (AS-19), ending her patrol. She received credit for sinking the sampans she engaged by gunfire, but the Submarine Combat Patrol Insignia was not granted for the patrol. The ship′s final report also congratulated Sellars on his personal completion of 12 war patrols.

Blackfish underwent a refit that lasted until 10 March 1945, during which her crew recuperated at Camp Dealey. The crew commenced training on 17 March, and Blackfish again was ready for sea by 20 March 1945 with a new air exhaust blower that dramatically improved the air quality aboard her.

===== Eleventh war patrol =====
On 21 March 1945, Blackfish stood out of Apra Harbor and shaped a course for the Luzon Strait-Formosa area and the general area of the South China Sea to conduct her eleventh war patrol. She again operated as part of a wolfpack, which also included the submarines USS Bullhead (SS-332), USS Seahorse (SS-304), and USS Tigrone (SS-419). Tigrone′s commanding officer served as overall wolfpack commander.

The wolfpack arrived in its patrol area on 26 March 1945. Believing that there was little chance Blackfish would encounter targets, Sellars wrote that day that he assumed that the wolfpack would patrol off Batan Island for a few days "looking for a good bombardment spot" and Japanese submarines, since there is nothing else for us to do." On 27 March, Blackfish reconnoitered Batan Island and took photographs. While she was doing so, her galley went up in flames as a result of a deep fryer fire, but her crew contained the fire.

Blackfish identified a suitable bombardment target — a Japanese radio tower — on Batan Island on 29 March 1945. She surfaced at 18:04, and just as the sun was setting she closed the shoreline at full speed and opened gunfire from 2,500 yards (2,300 m). Her crew observed several direct hits, which threw up earth and debris around the radio tower. Following the attack, Blackfish heard and saw nothing of the Japanese on shore, but her sound operator picked up screw noises at a distance and she disengaged.

After another day of uneventful patrolling, Blackfish′s crew on 31 March 1945 observed two Japanese towers with gun emplacements on Pratas Island and decided to bombard them. Her 4-inch (102 mm), 20-millimeter, and 50-caliber machine-gun fire devastated the Japanese emplacements. As with the previous attack, the Japanese did not respond. Blackfish made a speedy withdrawal after detecting nearby aircraft.

On 2 April 1945, Blackfish was patrolling and conducting lifeguard duty near Pratas Reef. Just before 12:00 she sighted several junks. Her crew manned their battle stations, but the small ships were determined to be "friendly." Blackfish moved alongside one of the junks and a hospitable interaction took place with its Chinese crew. The fishermen did not speak English, but Blackfish′s crew exchanged grins with them, and traded bread and canned food to them for a string of squid.

While patrolling in her lifeguard area, Blackfish came across several naval mines and attempted to detonate them with .45-caliber (11.43 mm) Thompson submachine gun fire, which proved ineffective. Eventually, she used her 20-millimeter gun to destroy the mines. She also encountered an oil slick accompanied by a smell of diesel fuel, leading Sellars to contemplate the possibility that another submarine was in the area. On 3 April 1945, Blackfish encountered more mines in need of disposal, although she later identified one of the supposed mines as an old oil drum.

April 1945 continued with Blackfish engaged in routine patrolling and lifeguard duty and little more than sightings of occasional mines, numerous junks, and a few aircraft. She requested permission to venture to different sectors of her patrol area to try to find targets, but these requests were denied. On 22 April, she received orders to end her patrol the next day. Early on the morning of the 24 April, she surfaced near Pratas Reef and shelled a Japanese radio tower on Pratas Island to use up the remainder of her 4-inch (102 mm) ammunition, scoring at least twenty hits, and leaving the tower in a brown pall of smoke. She then shaped a course for Saipan.

Blackfish arrived in Tanapag Harbor on Saipan on 27 April 1945 and took on 70,000 US gallons (58,000 imp gal; 260,000 L) of fuel. She got back underway by 10:00 the same day. On 1 May, she set course for Pearl Harbor, which she reached on 10 May, bringing her patrol to an end. The patrol was not deemed worthy of the Submarine Combat Insignia, prompting Sellars to suggest that Blackfish′s repeated assignments to an operating area known to U.S. submariners as "Convoy College" was denying her an opportunity to find targets, and that her next patrol should be in what U.S. submariners called the "Empire Area", closer to the Japanese Home Islands, where targets were more plentiful and Blackfish′s crew would have a chance to earn the insignia.

===== Twelfth war patrol =====
On 14 June 1945, Blackfish put to sea from Pearl Harbor to begin her twelfth war patrol, headed for the Nanpō Islands, East China Sea, and Yellow Sea. Once again, her primary mission was lifeguard duty in support of airstrikes. She arrived at Guam on 30 June 1945, and after completing voyage repairs, got back underway for her patrol area on 3 July 1945. She arrived in her patrol zone on 7 July 1945.

Blackfish executed her lifeguard duties, exploded naval mines, and conducted occasional reconnaissance, but for the most part July 1945 faded away with little to report. On 3 August 1945, a major storm front moved in and broke with full fury, prompting Blackfish to dive to 150 feet (46 m), Sellars noting that he doubted "if we could ride this one out on the surface." Later that night, the storm′s 60-to-80-knot (110 to 150 km/h; 69 to 92 mph) winds and 40-foot (12 m) waves dissipated just as quickly as they had arrived.

A few days after the storm, what Sellars described as "swarms of American planes" headed toward Kogoshima Kaiwan, and Blackfish was called upon to rescue several downed aviators. Blackfish headed toward the aviators' position at flank speed. At 16:04 on 5 August 1945, she located and recovered six United States Army Air Forces aviators from the sea, all whom were in good spirits and good health. Word reached Blackfish on 6 August 1945 of another downed aviator in a life raft near southeastern Yaku Shima. She searched the area on 7 August, but located only an empty boat. On 8 August, she received a report of a downed plane 60 nautical miles (110 km; 69 mi) south of Tsurikaki Light, but she initially received the wrong coordinates, which resulted in a fruitless search, and Sellars remarked that Blackfish′s crew very well could have "saved the pilot if they had been given a correct position."

On 8 August, Blackfish bombarded Japanese shore installations on Kasagaki-Shima. On 9 August, she rendezvoused with the submarine USS Whale (SS-239) and commenced a personnel transfer, taking aboard 17 U.S. Navy and U.S. Army Air Forces personnel who remained aboard Blackfish for the duration of her patrol. Shortly after Blackfish took aboard the additional personnel, her evaporators failed, resulting in a prohibition of bathing. Several more cramped days at sea passed, but at last Blackfish arrived at Guam on 14 August 1945 and moored to the starboard side of the submarine tender USS Fulton (AS-11), ending the patrol. On 15 August 1945, hostilities with Japan ceased, bringing World War II to an end.

In total Blackfish′s twelfth and final war patrol had lasted 60 days, with 33 of them spent on station, 15 devoted to lifeguard duties, and 18 spent conducting offensive patrols. Although she made no attacks on Japanese shipping, she had rescued six U.S. Army Air Forces personnel, and her crew was authorized to wear the Submarine Combat Patrol Insignia.

=== Post-World War II ===
With a new commanding officer, Blackfish departed Guam on 27 August 1945, bound for the United States East Coast. After transiting the Panama Canal and making brief stops at New York City and Camden, New Jersey, she arrived at Naval Submarine Base New London in Groton, Connecticut, in September 1945. She underwent a pre-inactivation overhaul and was placed in an inactive status at Groton. On 11 May 1946, while still moored there, she was decommissioned and placed in reserve.

In January 1949, Blackfish was towed from Groton to the Portsmouth Naval Shipyard in Kittery, Maine, for renovation. On 5 May 1949, she reported for duty at the Naval Reserve Training Center at St. Petersburg, Florida, and began non-commissioned service as a training submarine for United States Naval Reserve personnel. On 2 February 1954, she returned to Naval Submarine Base New London and underwent another inactivation overhaul there. On 19 May 1955, she was placed out of service and berthed with the reserve fleet at New London.

== Disposal ==
In July 1955 Blackfish was deactivated, and on 1 September 1958 she was stricken from the Naval Vessel Register. On 4 May 1959 she was sold to Luria Brothers & Company Inc. of Philadelphia, Pennsylvania, for US$53,670.21. She subsequently was scrapped.

== Honors and awards ==
- European–African–Middle Eastern Campaign Medal with one battle star for World War II service
- Asiatic-Pacific Campaign Medal with seven battle stars for World War II service
- World War II Victory Medal
