= Bath County =

Bath County may refer to:

- Bath County, Kentucky, United States
- Bath County, Virginia, United States
- Bath County, North Carolina, United States, an extinct county
