= Baath =

Baath, Ba'ath or Ba'th may refer to:

== Politics ==
- Ba'athism
- Ba'ath Party
- Ba'ath Party (Iraqi-dominated faction)
  - Arab Socialist Ba'ath Party – Iraq Region
  - Arab Socialist Ba'ath Party – Egypt Region
  - Arab Socialist Ba'ath Party – Region of Sudan
  - Arab Socialist Ba'ath Party of Algeria
  - National Arab Socialist Ba'ath Party – Yemen Region
  - Tunisian Ba'ath Movement
  - Jordanian Arab Socialist Ba'ath Party
  - Libyan Arab Socialist Ba'ath Party
- Ba'ath Party (Syrian-dominated faction)
  - Arab Socialist Ba'ath Party – Syria Region
  - Arab Socialist Ba'ath Party – Organization of Sudan
  - Arab Socialist Ba'ath Party – Lebanon Region
  - Arab Socialist Ba'ath Party – Yemen Region
- Sudanese Ba'ath Party
- Arab Democratic Socialist Ba'ath Party
- Arab Socialist Revolutionary Ba'ath Party
- Ba'athist Iraq
- Ba'athist Syria
- De-Ba'athification
- February 1963 Iraqi coup d'état
- 1963 Syrian coup d'état

== Places ==
- Baath Dam, former name of Mansoura Dam during Ba'athist Syria
- Al-Baath Stadium, former name of Jableh Stadium
- Al-Baath University, name of Homs University during Ba'athist Syria

== Other ==
- Albert Ulrik Bååth
- Anders Bååth
- A Flood in Baath Country, a Syrian documentary film
