= Bath Mountain =

Mountain in the American state of California

- Location within California

Highest point
- Elevation: 10,532 ft (3,210 m)
- Prominence: 600 ft (180 m)
- Coordinates: 38°3′29″N 119°27′53″W

Geography
- Location: Yosemite National Park, Tuolumne County, California, United States
- Parent range: Sierra Nevada
- Topo map: USGS Matterhorn Peak

Bath Mountain is a summit in Yosemite National Park, United States. With an elevation of 10,482 feet (3,195 m), Bath Mountain is the 517th highest summit in the state of California.

Bath Mountain was so named when a USGS topographer took a bath in a lake at its base in 1905.
