= Joy Berry =

American writer

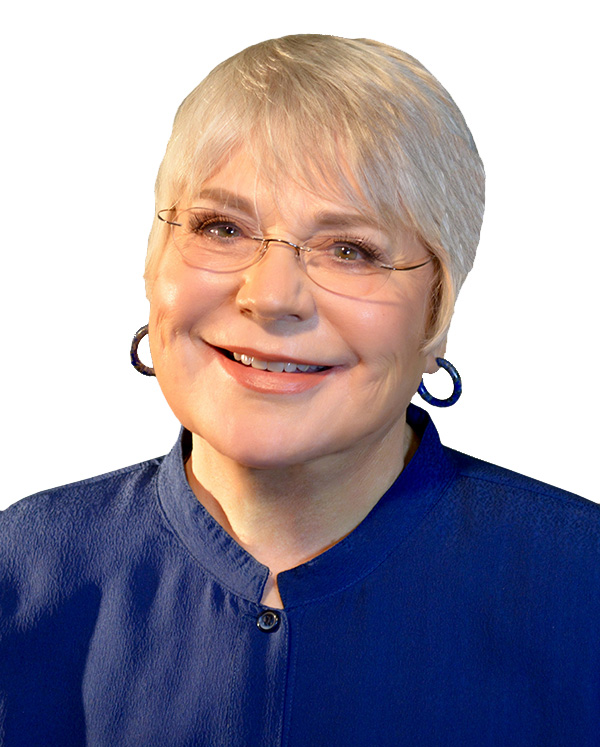
- Author Joy Berry
- Born: April 15, 1944 (age 82)
- Occupations: Author, educator, parenting expert and character development specialist
- Writing career
- Genres: Children's literature, child development, moral character development
- Website: joyberryenterprises.com

Joy Berry (born April 15, 1944) is an American writer and child development specialist.

== Biography ==
Berry has written over 250 self-help books for kids that have sold over 85 million copies, and is known in the juvenile publishing and media industries as the "Inventor of Self-Help Books for Kids".

According to Berry, “I began writing self-help books for kids in order to fill a void in both educational institutions as well as the marketplace. My goal was to provide step-by-step, easy to understand information that could help kids become responsible for themselves, responsible in their relationship with others, and responsible in the way in which they relate to their environment.”

In 2004, Amnesty International and the United Nations recruited Berry to translate the Convention on the Rights of the Child into a self-help book for kids with related educational materials called Mine and Yours. Soon after, the American Red Cross recruited Berry to write two self-help books for kids with related educational materials that addressed the subjects of Human Dignity as put forth in International Humanitarian Law and Peaceful Conflict Resolution as put forth in the Geneva Conventions.

In 2013, the materials developed for Amnesty International, the United Nations, and the American Red Cross were updated and incorporated into a single edutainment program called Kids for Global Peace. The program features animated characters called The Junkroom Band and includes an interactive website, 36 two-minute music and dance television interstitials (that combine live action with animation), three electronic comic books, and three teachers guides that teach kids about human rights, human dignity, and peaceful conflict resolution.

== The Human race club series ==
The Lean Mean Machines: A Story about Handling Feelings

The Letter on Light Blue Stationery: A Story about Self-Esteem

What Happened to A.J.?: A Story about Human Rights

A Fair Weather Friend: A Story about Friendship

A High Price to Pay: A Story about Managing Money

Casey's Revenge: A Story about Fighting Between Brothers and Sisters

The Battle at the McGoverns': A Story about Family Arguments

The Saturday Night Stalker: A Story about Nightmares

The Unforgettable Pen Pal: A Story about Prejudice and Discrimination

== Book series ==
The Joy Berry Classics collection of books is divided into seven series which are designed to address childhood issues at every age.

All books feature free downloads, which include (but are not limited to): Tips for Parents, Read Along Soundtracks, and Original Music.

=== Teach me about (TMA) ===
These teach the first steps toward responsibility to children up to three years old.

Very young children often develop irresponsible behavior when they are not encouraged to assume responsibility for their actions and reactions. Parents often foster irresponsible behavior by perceiving children as helpless and incapable of assuming responsibility for their lives.

The purpose of the TMA books is to help parents begin the process of shifting the responsibility for a child's behavior from the parent to the child. These books accomplish this by helping children understand and handle appropriately the people and experiences that they encounter in their everyday lives.

(Books in the TMA series include: Mealtime, Bathtime, Getting Dressed, Bedtime, Travel, Potty Training, Illness, Danger, Boredom, Feelings, Crying, Security Objects, Mommies & Daddies, Brothers & Sisters, Grandparents, Relatives, Different Families, Pets, Friends, The Babysitter, The Doctor, The Dentist, Looking, Listening, Tasting, Smelling, Touching, My Body, Pretending, Day Care, School).

=== Let's talk about (LTA) ===
These suggest handling emotions in positive ways to children three to five.

Raw emotions as well as emotionally charged situations are the source of a child's first inner conflicts and discomfort. This inner turmoil can manifest in unacceptable behavior that can be troublesome to parents as well as children.

The purpose of the LTA books is to educate young children regarding their emotions as well as the emotionally charged situations they encounter so that they can understand and handle these emotions and situations in positive instead of negative ways.

(Books in the LTA series include: Disobeying, Feeling Afraid, Feeling Worried, Feeling Frustrated, Feeling Defeated, Feeling Guilty, Feeling Sad, Feeling Lonely, Feeling Angry, Feeling Embarrassed, Feeling Inferior, Feeling Jealous, Feeling Disappointed, Feeling Cheated, Feeling Rejected, Being Away, Being Shy, New Situations, Getting Hurt, Getting Lost, Being Afraid to Fail, Being Patient, Being Good, Needing Attention, Saying "No", Accepting "No", Being Cooperative, Being Fair, Playing with Others, Being Helpful, Making Others Angry).

=== Help me be good (HMBG) ===
These help replace misbehavior with good behavior in children five to seven.

The normal egocentricity of young children often leads to misbehavior that evokes unwanted responses from others. These unwanted responses can lead to a destructive cycle of negative action and reaction.

The purpose of the HMBG books is to help break the cycle of negative action and reaction. This is accomplished by each book defining a misbehavior; explaining the cause of the misbehavior; discussing the negative effects of the misbehavior; and offering suggestions for replacing the misbehavior with acceptable behavior.

(Books in the HMBG series include: Being Lazy, Being Forgetful, Being Careless, Being Messy, Being Wasteful, Overdoing It, Showing Off, Being a Bad Sport, Being Selfish, Being Greedy, Breaking Promises, Disobeying, Interrupting, Whining, Complaining, Throwing Tantrums, Teasing, Tattling, Gossiping, Being Rude, Snooping, Lying, Cheating, Stealing, Being Bullied, Being Bossy, Being Destructive, Fighting, Being Mean).

=== Living skills (LS) ===
Seven to nine-year-olds learn to live.

Children are often ill-equipped to assume responsibility. Failure to function responsibly can result in a lack of meaning and productivity that can lead to dissatisfaction and regret.

The purpose of the LS books is to teach children the information and skills they need to live intelligent, responsible lives. This is accomplished by teaching children the personal skills they need to take care of themselves, the social skills they need to develop and maintain positive relationships, and the coping skills they need to relate to things in positive rather than negative ways.

(Books is the LS series include: Self Esteem, Human Sexuality, Health & Nutrition, Emotions, Rights & Responsibilities, Prejudice & Discrimination, Thinking & Learning, Decisions & Problems, Personal Goals, Manners, Communication, Disagreements, Friendships, Parent/Child Relationships, Sibling Relationships, Family Rules & Responsibilities, Family Arguments, Nightmares, Illness, Danger, Trauma, Time Management, Money Management, Consumerism, Family Law, School Law, Community Law, The Juvenile Justice System).

=== Survival skills (SS) ===
Children nine to eleven years of age should strive to survive.

Some children are often not prepared to fulfill the expectations society has of them, resulting in failure, frustration and disappointment for themselves and others.

The purpose of the SS books is to provide the information and skills that let children follow through with expectations, like cleaning their rooms, getting good grades, caring for their pets, and choosing the right peer groups.

(Books is the SS series include: Good Grooming, Getting Dressed, Good Posture, Sleep and Rest, Cooking for Yourself, Being Prepared, Being Careful, Handling Emergencies, Table Etiquette, Telephone Etiquette, Writing Etiquette, Public Etiquette, Entertaining, Visiting, Peer Groups, Rules and Regulations, Boredom, Using Television, Using the Computer, Using the Internet, Playing Electronic Games, Homework & Schoolwork, Good Grades, Cleaning Your Room, Caring For Your Clothes, Doing Yard Work, Caring For Your Pet, Babysitting, Conservation, Earning an Allowance, Family Finances).

=== Winning skills (WS) ===
Self-actualization begins at eleven.

Preadolescent misbehavior is often a direct result of low self-esteem, lack of purpose or direction, pressure to succeed, traumatic experiences, unresolved problems, and/or boredom. Peer pressure is often the catalyst that turns these factors into misbehavior.

Dealing with preadolescent misbehavior via the shape-up-or-ship-out approach can be ineffectual because it deals with the symptoms rather than the problems. In order to make a substantial impact on preadolescent misbehavior it is imperative to resolve the issues that cause it.

The purpose of the WS books is to help young people overcome obstacles that prevent genuine happiness and success, get in control of their lives, and excel in every way possible.

(Books in the WS series include: You Can Overcome Fear, You Can Overcome Stress, You Can Handle Criticism & Rejection, You Can Handle Rude People, You Can Handle Tough Situations, You Can Get Rid of Bad Habits, You Can Be Smart, You Can Be Creative, You Can Be Assertive, You Can Be In Control, You Can Get Organized, You Can Achieve Goals, You Can Be Beautiful, You Can Be Liked, You Can Be Happy, You Can Be a Star, You Can Be a Winner, You Can Have a Great Future).

=== Good answers to tough questions (GATQ) ===
Addressing challenging subjects for children of all ages

All children encounter, either directly or indirectly, difficult subjects and situations that can, if not handled properly, have a negative. Many adults are not equipped to help children handle appropriately the difficulties they experience.

The purpose of the GATQ books is to provide honest, unbiased answers to hard questions that can help children as well as adults turn negative experiences into positive ones. The books can also help parents, teachers, and counselors initiate therapeutic dialogues and provide insights that can lead to healing and growth.

(Books in the GATQ series include: Dependence and Separation, First Time Experiences, Separation, Pregnancy and Birth, Adoption, Divorce, Stepfamilies, Moving, Eating Disorders, Substance Abuse, Physical Disabilities, Blindness, Deafness, Learning Disabilities, Mental Illness, Serious Illness, Abuse and Neglect, Sexual Abuse, Kidnapping, Trauma, Disasters, War, Loss, Death).

== Single books ==
In addition to the Joy Berry Classics, Joy has also written the following books:

Mine and Yours (Human Rights for Kids)

So What's Wrong With Playing Video Games?

ACTIVITY BOOKS

- Can Make and Do (12 activity books)
- Relationship Builders (2 books about non-competitive games and activities)
- Sensational Seasons and Holidays (12 activity books)
- Dozens of Dynamite Things (12 activity books)
- Every Kids Guide to Saving the Earth (instructional and activity book)

PARENTING BOOKS

- Happily Everafter
- Helping Them Tame the Big Bad Wolves
- The Uncomplicated Guide to Becoming a Superparent
- Loving Your Child toward Spiritual and Emotional Maturity
- Keep Your Child Safe from Kidnapping
- Keep Your Child Safe from Sexual Abuse
- Keep Your Child Safe from Abuse and Neglect
- Raising Responsible Kids

In 1986, Berry also published the book Looking, a children's book about vision.

== Joy Berry in the media ==
- Crains New York: Starting a business at an age when most folks are thinking retirement
- Sacramento Bee: Parents are not the only ones affected...
- Parenting.com: Time to Give Up On Santa?
- Univision: Potty Training (in Spanish)
