= Treaty of Baden (1718) =

Swiss peace treaty

The Treaty or Peace of Baden, signed on 16 June 1718, ended the Toggenburg War among the members of the Old Swiss Confederacy.
