= Bath, Georgia =

Unincorporated community in Georgia, U.S.

Coordinates: 33°20′20″N 82°10′35″W

Bath is an unincorporated community in Richmond County, in the U.S. state of Georgia.

== History ==
The community was so named on account of a mineral spa near the original town site. An early variant name was "Richmond Baths". A post office called Bath was established in 1854, and remained in operation until 1907. In 1900, the community had 100 inhabitants.
