= Coliseu dos Recreios de Lisboa – October 30th, 2001 =

Live album by Tindersticks
- Released: 2003
- Recorded: October 30, 2001

Coliseu dos Recreios de Lisboa – October 30th, 2001 is a live album by Tindersticks. The album was the second in a series of 'official bootlegs', and was limited to 2500 copies.

== Track listing ==
1. "My Autumn’s Done Come"
2. "Dying Slowly"
3. "Kathleen"
4. "Buried Bones"
5. "Desperate Man"
6. "Her"
7. "She’s Gone"
8. "Bathtime"
9. "Running Wild"
10. "Sleepy Song"
11. "El Diablo en el Ojo"
12. "Drunk Tank"
13. "Raindrops"
14. "Cherry Blossoms"
