= Bath Spa =

Bath Spa may refer to:

- Bath Spa railway station, Bath, Somerset
- Bath Spa University, one of two universities in Bath
- Roman Baths (Bath), a Roman spa complex constructed on hot springs, now a museum
- Thermae Bath Spa, a 2006 spa supplied by the hot springs

== See also ==
- Bath, Somerset, a city in England
