= Bath Township =

Bath Township may refer to:

- Bath Township, Mason County, Illinois
- Bath Township, Franklin County, Indiana
- Bath Township, Cerro Gordo County, Iowa
- Bath Township, Michigan
- Bath Township, Minnesota
- Bath Township, Allen County, Ohio
- Bath Township, Greene County, Ohio
- Bath Township, Summit County, Ohio
- Bath Township, Brown County, South Dakota
