= Notkersegg Convent =

Convent of Capuchin nuns in St. Gallen

- Kloster Notkersegg
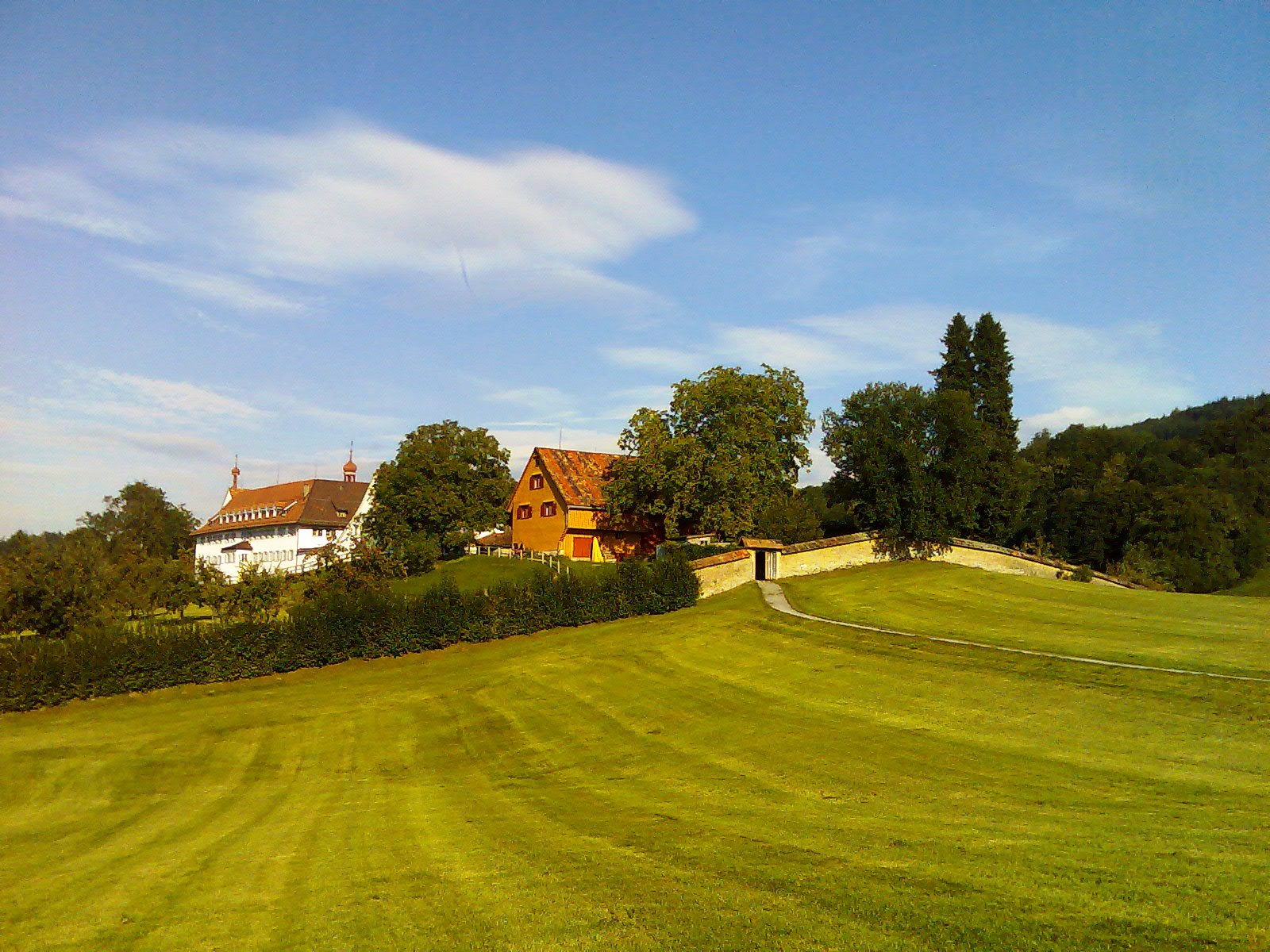
- The convent seen from the west
- Interactive map of Notkersegg Convent

Monastery information
- Order: Capuchin nuns (since 1602)
- Established: 1381
- Dedication: Our Lady of Good Counsel
- Diocese: St. Gallen (since 1847)

Site
- Location: Notkersegg, St. Gallen, Switzerland
- Coordinates: 47.425°N 9.39972°E

Notkersegg Convent (German: Kloster Notkersegg) is a convent of Capuchin nuns near St. Gallen, Switzerland, dedicated to Our Lady of Good Counsel. It goes back to a house of sisters founded in 1381 by three farmers, whose members are attested as Franciscan tertiaries from 1479. In 1602 it joined the reform of Pfanneregg, and it has been a community of Capuchin nuns since then. It belonged to the Diocese of Constance until 1814 and has belonged to the Diocese of St. Gallen since 1847.

== History ==
In 1396 the abbot of St. Gallen, Kuno von Stoffeln, confirmed the sisters' house "im Tann" near Notkersegg in Tablat, which three farmers had founded in 1381. The sisters are attested as Franciscan tertiaries from 1479. The right of visitation lay at first with Upper German Conventual Franciscans and from 1596 with the apostolic nuncio, and in 1614 it passed to the Prince-Abbey of St. Gallen. In 1602 Notkersegg joined the reform of Pfanneregg, and since then it has been a convent of Capuchin nuns.

In 1669 the sisters moved into the new convent at its present site in Wiesen. It burned down in 1718 and was rebuilt by 1720. From 1776 the sisters practiced perpetual adoration. In 1798–1799 they fled to Vorarlberg from the French invasion and the War of the Second Coalition. The convent was restored in 1803, and it was rebuilt and renovated several times in the 19th and 20th centuries.

Notkersegg belonged to the Diocese of Constance until 1814, was under various apostolic administrations from 1814 to 1847, and has belonged to the Diocese of St. Gallen since 1847. The community numbered 40 sisters in 1953 and 16 sisters and one novice in 2009, who then earned their living mainly by doing the church laundry for the surrounding parishes.

== Bibliography ==
- Helvetia Sacra, V/2, pp. 1050–1056; IX/2, pp. 597–606
- H. Bauer et al., Kloster Notkersegg, 1381–1981, 1981
- B. Schubiger, Kapuzinerinnenkloster Notkersegg bei St. Gallen, 1990
