= Bath Island =

Neighbourhood in Karachi

Coordinates: 24°50′N 67°02′E

Bath Island (Urdu: باتھ آئی لینڈ) is a neighbourhood in Clifton, Karachi, Sindh, Pakistan.

There are several ethnic groups including, Sindhis, Muhajirs, Punjabis, Kashmiris, Seraikis, Pakhtuns, Balochis, Memons, Bohras and Ismailis.
