= Gies College of Business =

Business school of the University of Illinois (Urbana-Champaign)

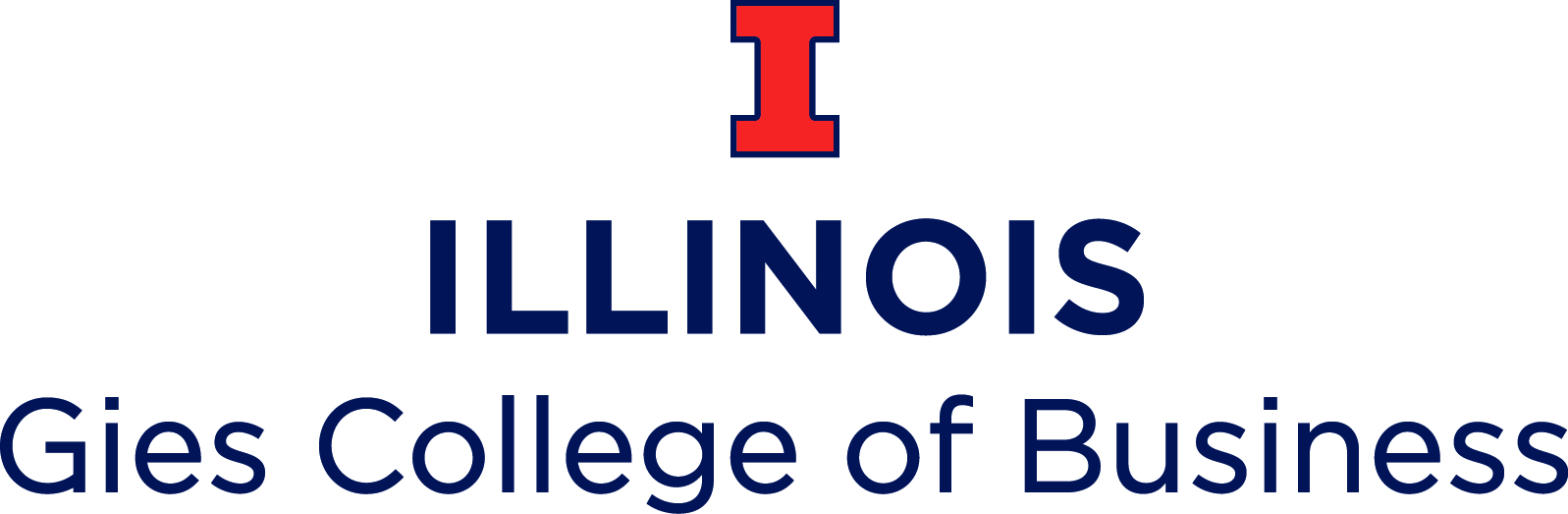
- Former names: College of Commerce and Business Administration; University of Illinois College of Business
- Type: Public business school
- Established: 1925; 101 years ago
- Parent institution: University of Illinois Urbana-Champaign
- Endowment: $87.4 million (2007)
- Dean: W. Brooke Elliott
- Undergraduates: 3,000 students
- Postgraduates: 3,074 students
- Location: Champaign, Illinois, United States; 40.1038°N 88.2309°W
- Website: giesbusiness.illinois.edu

The Gies College of Business, is the business school of the University of Illinois Urbana-Champaign, a public research university in Champaign, Illinois. The college offers undergraduate programs, masters programs, and a PhD program. The college and its Department of Accountancy are separately accredited by AACSB International.

As of 2025, Gies College of Business has over 3,000 undergraduate students and more than 3,000 postgraduate students currently enrolled. Additionally, as of 2024, there are more than 84,000 Gies Business alumni worldwide, including several Fulbright scholars.

== History ==
The university senate approved the College of Commerce and Business Administration on June 9, 1914 at the request of David Kinley, a university vice president who would later serve as president of the University of Illinois. The college was officially formed on April 27, 1915, through a vote of the University of Illinois Board of Trustees. The college began with three departments: Economics, Business Organization and Operation, and Transportation.

Since 2015, the college has partnered with Coursera to offer online MBA (iMBA) program, with additional options for online graduate certificates, an online MSM (iMSM), and an online MSA (iMSA). The school started with 113 students in the beginning for the online programs and later grew to more than 3,200 degree-seeking students from 46 states in United States and more than 90 countries in the world. The selectivity and acceptance rate to the program initially was 20.9% and is currently at 78%.

In 2017, alumni Larry and Beth Gies donated US $150M to the school, which was named the Gies College of Business in their honor. The gift transformed the school's growth by funding faculty expansion, online education, and scholarships. It remains one of the largest philanthropic gifts ever given to a business school.

In 2019, the school announced that it was suspending its on-campus full-time MBA, part-time MBA, and executive MBA.

In 2020, alumnus Don Edwards donated US$10 million and the business school also further received a pledge in 2020 for $2.5 million for construction of shared instructional facility.

In 2025, Gies pledged $100 million to the university's Division of Intercollegiate Athletics in honor of his father. The football stadium was subsequently renamed Gies Memorial Stadium.

In October 2026, Gies pledged to match up to $100 million in qualifying donations to the college. If fully matched, the commitment would provide $200 million for scholarships, student experiences, and faculty support. With the new pledge, Gies’s giving and commitments to the university totaled $350 million, including $250 million in gifts and commitments to the business school. News reports described him as the university’s largest individual donor and among the three largest lifetime donors to a U.S. business school.

== Campus ==
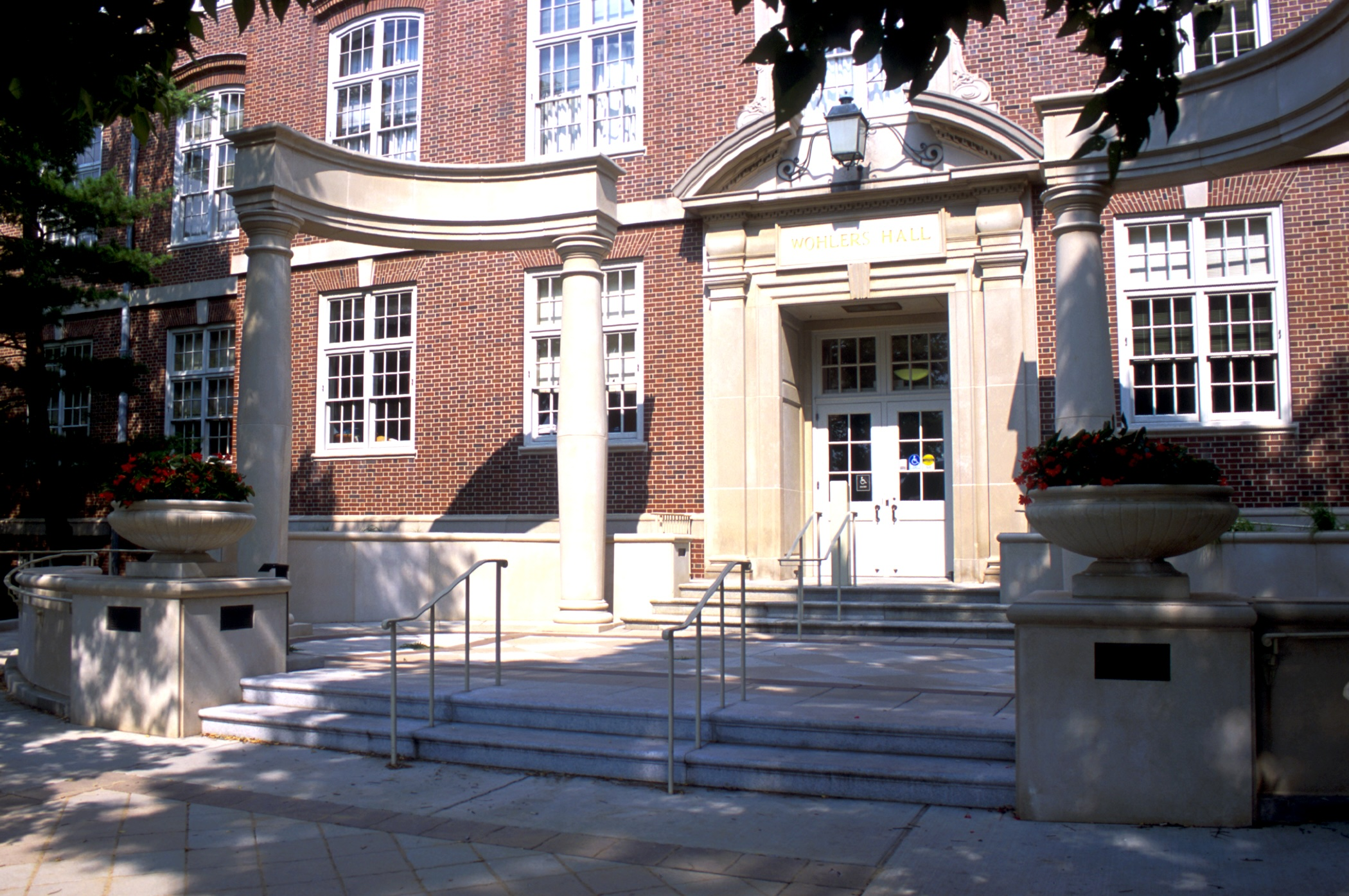
Wohlers Hall, 2024

Gies College of Business is located in Champaign, Illinois. The campus is located around the intersection of Gregory Street and Sixth Street. When the college was first formed, however, it occupied the Commerce Building, now the East half of the Administration Building on the Main Quad.

The college currently occupies four buildings: Wohlers Hall, Business Instructional Facility (BIF), Wymer Hall, and the Irwin Doctoral Study Hall. This area is known as the Business Quad and is considered part of the South Campus.

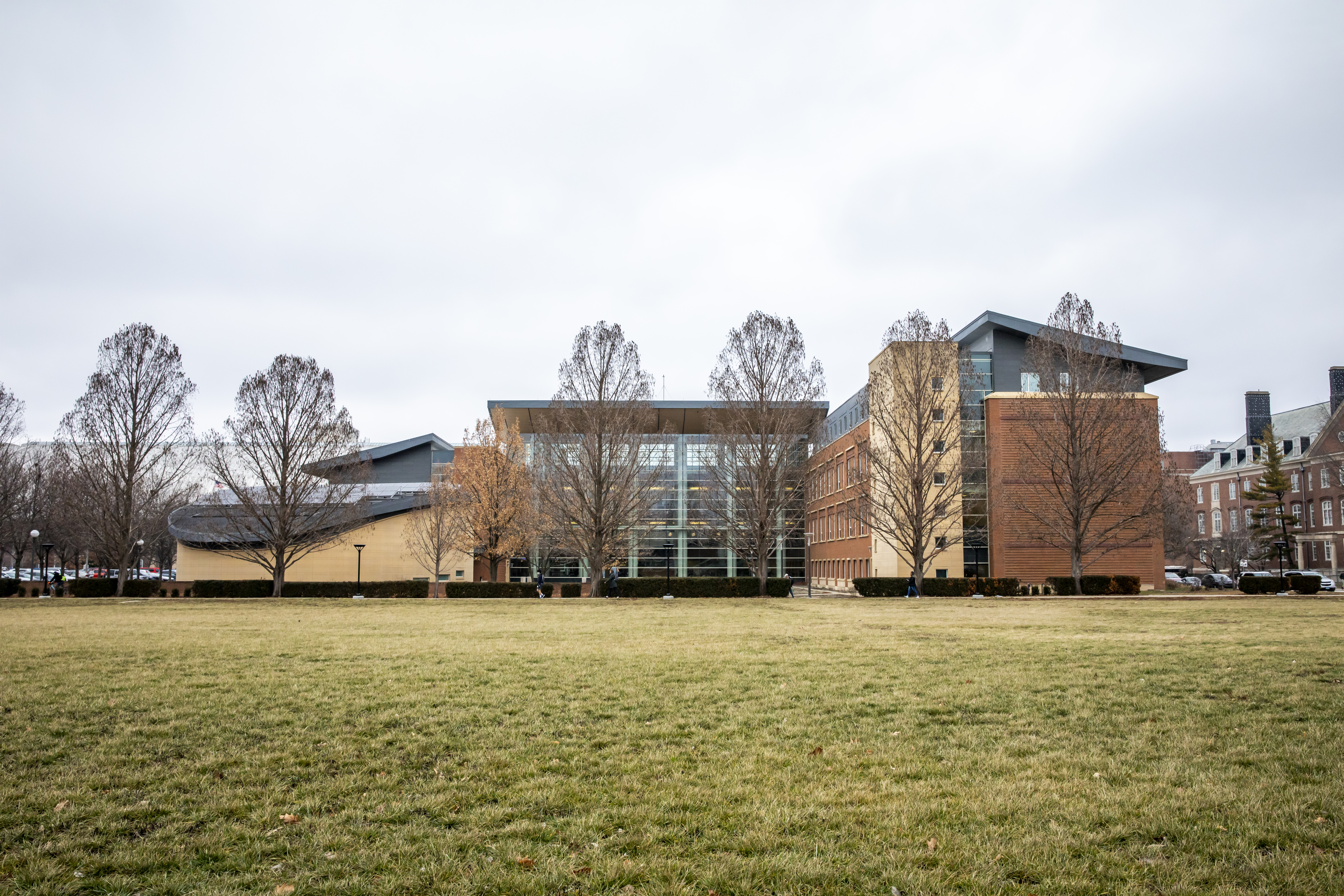
Business Instructional Facility, 2024

Wohlers Hall, formerly known as Commerce West, was built in 1963. Albert H. and Jane Wohlers provided a $6 million naming gift in 2000 for renovations.

The Business Instructional Facility (commonly referred to as "BIF"), passed by the UI Board of Trustees on July 14, 2004, stands opposite of Wohlers Hall across Sixth Street. The $62 million project, designed by architect Cesar Pelli, is LEED-certified because of its "green", environmentally friendly elements.

Steven S. Wymer Hall opened for the start of the Fall 2025 semester. The nearly 100,000-square-foot facility features flexible hybrid classrooms, informal collaboration spaces, and student focused lounges. Wymer Hall was made possible by a $25 million lead gift from alumnus Steven Wymer.

== Academic departments ==
Gies College of Business houses three departments: Accountancy, Business Administration, and Finance.

=== Accountancy ===
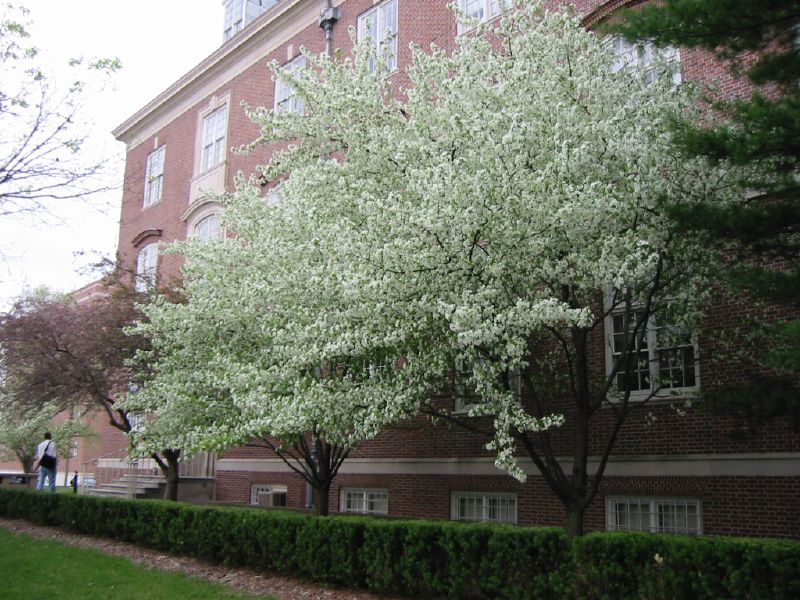
Wohlers Hall during the spring of 2004

The origin of the department of accountancy can be tracked back to 1915.

The University offered courses in accounting before the creation of the University of Illinois Urbana-Champaign College of Business. The courses in the university were offered through the Department of Economics from 1902 to 1915. The college began the first PhD program in 1939 and has graduated more accountancy PhD candidates than any other accountancy department in the United States. After the formation of the college, the accountancy program was moved into the Department of Business Organization until the Department's reorganization in the 1950s.

In 1919, H.T. Scovill helped establish the Beta Alpha Psi accounting honor society.

=== Business Administration ===
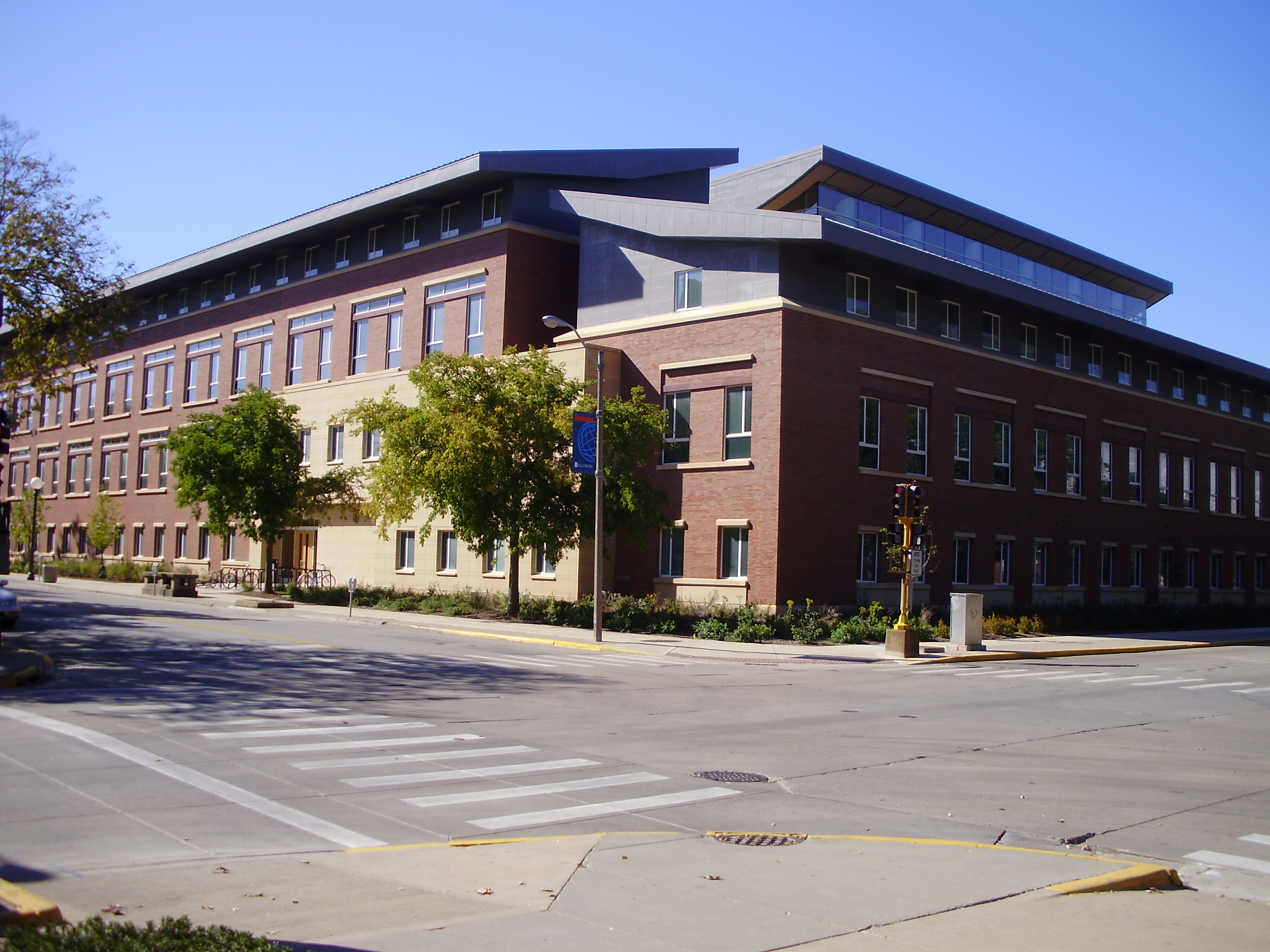
The Business Instructional Facility during the fall of 2008

The Department of Business Administration was founded in 1968 through the mergers of the Department of Industrial Administration and Marketing and the Graduate School of Business Administration. The department offers an iMBA program in collaboration with Coursera.

Each iMBA course has self-directed, asynchronous pre-recorded video courses. Classes typically have individual assignments, group assignments, and may include midterm and final exams.

Degree programs are flexible with completion time ranging from 24-60 months. Courses are 4-8 weeks long and students may register for 1-4 courses per 16 week semester; if approved, students can take additional courses each semester and complete the iMBA in as little as 15 months.

Students can select from 5 focus areas and 18+ electives. Core specializations include Strategic Leadership and Management, Managerial Economics and Business Analysis, Value Chain Management, and Financial Management. Focus area specializations include Digital Marketing, Entrepreneurship and Strategic Innovation, Global Challenges in Business, Business Analytics, and Mergers and Acquisitions.

=== Finance ===
In 1957, the UI Board of Trustees approved the Dean's proposal to create a Department of Finance. The MSF program began the following year.

== Academies and centers ==
=== University of Illinois-Deloitte Foundation Center for Business Analytics ===
The University of Illinois-Deloitte Foundation Center for Business Analytics was established on October 25, 2016 by Deloitte Foundation thanks to a $5 million gift from the Deloitte Foundation and Deloitte's retired and current partners, principals, managing directors and employees.

=== Illinois MakerLab ===
The Illinois MakerLab is the world's first business school 3D printing lab located on the third floor of the Business Instructional Facility. After opening in spring of 2013, the MakerLab has provided printing, custom designing and prototyping, educational, and other related services for both the Urbana-Champaign and University of Illinois community. The lab is equipped with over 20 Ultimaker 3D printers and is run by undergraduate and graduate students. The lab was co-founded by Aric Rindfleisch and Vishal Sachdev.

=== Origin Ventures Academy for Entrepreneurial Leadership ===
The Origin Ventures Academy for Entrepreneurial Leadership, established in 2004, is responsible for cross-campus and multidisciplinary programs for entrepreneurial students from all backgrounds including the award-winning iVenture Accelerator and Illinois Social Innovation.

== Rankings ==
As of 2024, Gies College of Business is ranked #2 in Accounting by U.S. News & World Report.

== Notable people ==
=== Alumni ===
Gies College of Business has many notable alumni. Alumni are denoted by their area of study: accountancy (ACCY), business administration (BADM), finance (FIN), or general/unassigned (GEN) or MBA.

==== Academia ====
- Michael Mikhail (MAS '88) - Dean, College of Business Administration at the University of Illinois at Chicago
- Robert J. Swieringa (ACCY '69) – Dean of Samuel Curtis Johnson Graduate School of Management.
- Nicholas Dopuch (ACCY '61) – Former Head of Accounting, Washington University in St. Louis.
- A.C. Littleton (ACCY '12, '18, '31) – Professor and accounting historian University of Illinois, editor-in-chief The Accounting Review, Accounting Hall of Fame inductee
- Sybil C. Mobley (ACCY '64) – Dean and Head of Accounting, Florida A&M.
- Clyde Summers (ACCY '39), labor lawyer and law professor at the Yale Law School and University of Pennsylvania Law School, subject of In re Summers
- Geeta Menon (PhD), Professor at New York University Stern School of Business

==== Business ====
- Thomas Siebel (MBA) - Billionaire and Founder of Siebel Systems, C3.ai
- Michael Krasny (FIN '75) - Billionaire and Founder of CDW Corporation
- Sunil Benimadhu (MBA) - CEO of Stock Exchange of Mauritius
- Ravin Gandhi (FIN '1994) - Founder of Coatings and Chemicals Corporation
- Jim Cantalupo (ACCY '66) – Former Chairman and CEO of McDonald's (1991–2004)
- Richard H. Frank (BADM '64) – Former President, Walt Disney Studios
- George Henry Lesch (GEN '31) – Chairman of the Board, Colgate-Palmolive Company
- Thomas Murphy (ACCY '38) – Former CEO and chairman, General Motors
- John D. Zeglis (FIN '69) – Former President, AT&T; Former Chairman and CEO of AT&T Wireless

==== Government and politics ====
- Kelly Loeffler - United States Senator for Georgia
- Charles Bowsher (ACCY '53) – Comptroller General of the United States, Government Accountability Office
- George Evan Howell (GEN '27), U.S. Congressman
- Samuel K. Skinner (ACCY '60) – Secretary of Transportation (1989–1991); White House Chief of Staff during the George H. W. Bush Administration (1992)

==== Armed forces ====
- Alex Fink (MBA) - Major General, Chief of Enterprise Marketing at United States Army
- Wilma L. Vaught (BADM '52) – Retired Brigadier General, United States Air Force

==== Sports ====
- Mike Small ('88) - Professional golfer and Head Coach for Illinois Fighting Illini men's golf
- Josh Whitman (FIN '01) – Athletic director at the University of Illinois, former NFL player

=== Faculty ===
- Heitor Almeida - Stanley C. and Joan J. Golder Chair in Corporate Finance
- Dan Bernhardt - IBE Distinguished Professor
- Jeffrey Brown - Josef and Margot Lakonishok Professor of Business
- Richard Engelbrecht-Wiggans - IBE Distinguished Professor Emeritus of Business Administration
- Jack A. Goncalo - Professor of Business Administration
- John Kindt - Professor Emeritus of Business Administration
- Kent Monroe - John M. Jones Distinguished Professor of Marketing
- Aric Rindfleisch - John M. Jones Professor of Marketing
- Daniel Simons - Professor of Business Administration
- Theodore Sougiannis - KPMG Distinguished Professor of Accountancy
- Scott Weisbenner - William G. Karnes Professor in Mergers and Acquisitions
- Jagdish Sheth - Former Distinguished Professor of Marketing (1969 to 1983)
- Shahbaz Gill - Assistant Professor

== See also ==
- List of United States business school rankings
- List of business schools in the United States
