= Hibur =

- Company type: Non Profit Organization - Voluntary
- Founded: 2005
- Headquarters: Haifa, Israel; Boston, Massachusetts, United States
- Website: http://hibur.technion.ac.il

HiBuR ("connection" in Hebrew) is a voluntary student program. HiBuR's main purpose is to forge connections between students of the Israel Institute of Technology (Technion) and Massachusetts Institute of Technology (MIT) by offering joint educational activities and practical experiences at both universities.

== Academic Exchange ==
Student Exchange – One of Hibur's current endeavors is to establish a program that provides students the opportunity to study abroad. This experience will enable students to:

- Globalize their educational experience
- Enhance academic opportunities that may otherwise be limited or unavailable
- Establish professional and career opportunities through networking
- Improve language skills and cultural understanding
- Experience personal growth

== Internships ==
Hibur’s internship program offers students the chance to live, study and work in a foreign country. Internship departments in Boston and Haifa place students in corporate and academic environments in Israel and the United States.

As a result of faculty and student interest MISTI decided to create MISTI Israel in the Summer of 2008.

The Haifa Department, with the collaboration of MISTI Israel, helped find internships for MIT students in Haifa-based high-tech companies and Technion campus laboratories,

== Technion-MIT activities ==
Hibur’s joint educational activities including video lectures, workshops, delegations, and various enrichment and higher learning opportunities, form an integral part of the program.

Video Lecture – Throughout the academic year, Technion and MIT researchers give online, dynamic lectures in real-time about the latest research in their fields of expertise. The video lectures are available to the greater student body and do not require prior background knowledge.

Teaching Assistant Workshops – Every year, MIT conducts a workshop focusing on improving the quality of academic classes. These workshops are geared to teaching assistants and professors alike. In the past, Hibur organized online workshops in which Technion teaching assistants and professors exchanged ideas and information with their MIT counterparts.

Delegations – Every year Hibur sends an Academic delegation of approximately eight to fifteen students to the Technion and MIT to exchange ideas, knowledge, and perspectives with students at the visited campus. This delegation provides an opportunity for students to swap information regarding their universities, native countries and ongoing research projects.

BizTEC & 100K – The Technion holds a yearly entrepreneur competition called BizTEC. The ten finalists of BizTEC then have the opportunity to compete in the equivalent entrepreneur competition at MIT, The MIT 100K.Entrepreneureship Competition. In order to compete, participating groups must have at least one representative from the university that holds the competition. Hibur’s programs offer students from the Technion and MIT the opportunity to connect and form groups that can work well and participate together in competitions at both universities.

Joint Academic Projects – Hibur’s online platform unites students from the Technion and MIT who would like to collaborate on final projects within similar disciplines. Students can perform research, write, and exchange information through Hibur’s website. Hibur also assists with the logistics involved in connecting researchers with students from each university and building joint intercontinental projects.

MathWorks – Hibur has implemented a preparation course, which has helped hundreds of students, in Matlab for the Technion pre-university refresher program. Matlab, developed by MathWorks Inc., is a technical computing software program used by engineers and scientists.
