= Engelbrecht =

Engelbrecht (or Englebrecht, Engelbrekt) is a common family name (surname) of Germanic origin. The name Engelbrecht has multiple translations, including "Angel Glorious" and "Bright Angel". The Surname Database says the name is a Dutch variant of an Old High German given name sometimes spelled Ingelbert or Engelbert. Engel can translate as "Angle" (the name of a German folk hero), a person from Angeln, or "angel". Brecht can translate as "bright" or "famous". The name was popular in Middle Age France because it was the name of a son-in-law of Charlemagne.

The first spelling variant of this name recorded in a survey was the Latinized given name Engelbricus in the Domesday Book of 1089. Engelbricht de Stanlega was recorded in the Pipe rolls of Somerset of 1176. Robert Ingleberd was the first record of a variant of "Engelbrecht" used as a family name, dated 1230 in the Pipe rolls of Yorkshire.

Some variations of the surname Engelbrecht such as Engelbert and Engelberdt are common. There was in the county of Flanders a family of Inghelbrechts whose name is recorded since the 13th century. Their offspring live mainly in actual Belgium, France, United Kingdom, Canada, United States and Australia.

== Given name ==
- Roald Engelbrecht Gravning Amundsen (1872–1928), Norwegian explorer of polar regions
- Engelbrekt Engelbrektsson or Engelbrecht Engelbrechtsson (1390s-1436), Swedish statesman and rebel
- Engelbert Kaempfer or Engelbrecht (1651–1716), German traveler and physician
- Engelbrecht Rodenburg, Dutch volleyball player

== Surname ==
- Adriaan Engelbrecht, South African rugby player
- Constanze Engelbrecht (1950–2000), German actress
- Daniel Engelbrecht, German football player
- Erwin Engelbrecht (1891–1964), German military officer, commander of Engelbrecht Division
- Grazjyna Engelbrecht, South African field hockey player
- H. C. Engelbrecht (1895–1939), American author
- Ian Engelbrecht, Zimbabwean cricketer
- Jacques Engelbrecht, South African rugby player
- JJ Engelbrecht, South African rugby player
- Joubert Engelbrecht, South African rugby player
- Julie Engelbrecht, French-born German actress
- Kim Engelbrecht, South African actress
- Morné Engelbrecht, Namibian cricketer
- Rabian Engelbrecht, South African cricketer
- Richard Engelbrecht-Wiggans, American economist
- Sybrand Engelbrecht (soldier) (1913–1994), South African Defence Force chief
- Sybrand Engelbrecht (cricketer) (born 1988), South African cricketer
- Willem Anthony Engelbrecht (1839–1921), Dutch jurist

== Fictional characters ==
- Engelbrecht, a "dwarf surrealist boxer" in short stories by Maurice Richardson

== See also ==
- Engelbrekt Rebellion
