= Angilbert (disambiguation) =

Angilbert (d. 814) was a Frankish nobleman, poet and saint.

Angilbert (also spelled Angelbert, Engilbert, etc.) may also refer to:

- Angelbert (bishop of Reims), flourished in the 640s
- Angilbert I, archbishop of Milan from 822 to 823
- Angilbert II, archbishop of Milan from 824 to 851
- Angelbert, Frankish soldier who wrote a poem about the battle of Fontenoy in 841
- Engilbert I of Saint Gall, abbot around 840
- Engilbert II of Saint Gall, abbot between 925 and 933

== See also ==
- Engelbert (name)
