= Engilbert of Saint Gall =

Engilbert of Saint Gall may refer to:

- Engilbert I of Saint Gall (abbot 840/841)
- Engilbert II of Saint Gall (abbot 925–933)
