= InformaCast =

InformaCast is a proprietary Voice over IP network protocol for live audio paging. The protocol allows endpoints (such as public address speakers) to autonomously announce their presence and capabilities (such as recording or GPIO) and configure themselves to play audio broadcasts. InformaCast was originally developed by Berbee and later spun off into a separate company as Singlewire Software.

The protocol is built largely on standard technologies including SLP for locating a configuration server, TFTP for obtaining configuration data, HTTP and XML for registering devices and transmitting commands, and multicast RTP for audio playback and recording.
