= Engelbert (name) =

Notable people with name Engelbert include:

== Given name ==
- Engelbert, Duke of Carinthia (died 1141)
- Engelbert III, Margrave of Istria (died 1173), son of Duke Engelbert
- Engelbert, 8th Duke of Arenberg (1824–1875)
- Engelbert I, Count of Berg (died 1189)
- Engelbert II of Berg (1185 or 1186–1225), saint and Archbishop of Cologne, also known as Engelbert I
- Engelbert II of the Mark (died 1328)
- Engelbert III of the Marck, Archbishop of Cologne (1304–1368), Prince-Bishop of Liège
- Engelbert II of Falkenburg, Archbishop-Elector of Cologne (1261–1274)
- Engelbert II of Nassau (1451–1504), Count of Nassau and Vianden
- Engelbert, Count of Nevers (1462–1506)
- Engelbert of Admont (ca. 1250–1331), abbot of the Benedictine monastery at Admont, Styria
- Engelbert Besednjak (1894–1968), Slovene politician, lawyer and journalist
- Engelbert Bockhoff (1913–2010), German soldier of World War II awarded the Knight's Cross of the Iron Cross
- Engelbert Brenner (ca. 1904–1986), soloist on oboe and then English horn with the New York Philharmonic Orchestra
- Engelbert Broda (1910–1983), Soviet KGB spy, physicist and chemist
- Engelbert Dollfuss (1892–1934), second to last Austrian chancellor before the Anschluss
- Engelbert Endrass (1911–1941), German World War II U-boat commander
- Engelbert Fuchs, Austrian luger in the 1970s
- Engelbert Humperdinck (composer) (1854–1921), a German composer, best known for his opera Hänsel und Gretel
- Engelbert Humperdinck (singer) (born 1936), British pop singer
- Engelbert Kaempfer (1651–1716), German naturalist and physician
- Engelbert Lulla (born 1925), Austrian sprint canoer
- Engelbert Mühlbacher (1843–1903), Austrian historian
- Engelbert Röntgen (1829–1897), German-Dutch violinist
- Engelbert Rugeje, Chief of Staff of the Zimbabwe National Army
- Engelbert Seibertz (disambiguation), multiple people
- Engelbert Sterckx (1792–1867), Archbishop of Mechelen, Belgium
- Engelbert Zaschka (1895–1955), German engineer, designer and inventor

== Surname ==
- Cathy Engelbert (born 1964), American business executive
- Giovanna Battaglia Engelbert (born 1979), Italian fashion editor
- Henry Engelbert (1826-1901), 19th century German-American architect
- John Engelbert (born 1982), Swedish musician
- Louis Engelbert, 6th Duke of Arenberg (1750–1820)

== See also ==
- Angilbert (disambiguation)
- Douglas Engelbart, inventor, early computer and Internet pioneer (1925–2013)
- Herr Engelbert Von Smallhausen, in the British sitcom 'Allo 'Allo!
- Engelbrecht which Engelbert is a variant spelling of
