= Singlewire Software =

Singlewire Software, LLC
- Predecessors: Berbee Information Networks Corporation, CDW
- Founded: April 1, 2009; 17 years ago in Madison, WI, United States
- Headquarters: Madison, WI
- Products: InformaCast Advanced, InformaCast Mobile, InformaCast Fusion

Singlewire Software, LLC develops and supports ip-based voice applications for emergency communication with mass notification capabilities. The company is located in Madison, Wisconsin in the United States of America.

== History ==
The Berbee Software IP Telephony engineering and sales team was originally formed under Berbee Information Networks Corporation in 1998. The mission of the group was to create software applications to enhance the capabilities of Voice Over IP networks which were rapidly being deployed in organizations. InformaCast, the group's flagship application, was developed as mass notification system for a federal government client in response to the September 11 terrorist attacks. Berbee was acquired by CDW Corporation on October 11, 2006. In April 2009, the group formed a company, Singlewire Software, which repurchased the assets it had developed. while all other portions of the former Berbee Information Networks Corporation remain with CDW and form the heart of CDW’s Advanced Technology Services offerings.

== Applications ==
Singlewire continues to enhance the InformaCast platform to include the integration of its notification technology into the physical security space. Its suite of applications is designed to detect incidents within an organization, notify people or systems of such incidents, and activate the necessary systems to resolve the situation. Product features include enterprise-wide paging, emergency mass notification, remote detection of incidents on an IP network (i.e. activating RFID tags and IP video cameras and sending audio and text messages to IP phones and desktop workstations), and remote control of IP phones for training and support. Singlewire Software applications are presently used by over 2,000 businesses in 47 countries.

== Organization ==
Paul Shain, former CEO of Berbee and former Senior VP at CDW, serves as President and Chief Executive Officer.
