= Scott Weisbenner =

American economist

- Died: September 29, 2022

Academic background
- Education: University of Wisconsin–Madison; Massachusetts Institute of Technology

Scott Weisbenner was an American economist, focusing on household portfolio decisions and the financial and operational decisions made by corporate executives and other institutional managers. He was the William G. Karnes Professor of Finance for the Gies College of Business at the University of Illinois and before that, the A.J. Pasant Professor of Finance at Michigan State University.

He received his BA in economics and mathematics from the University of Wisconsin-Madison in 1995, and received his PhD in economics from the Massachusetts Institute of Technology (MIT) in 1999. While at MIT, he was classmates with Jeffrey Brown, his future colleague and current dean of the Gies College of Business.

== Selected works ==
- Zoran Ivokovic, Clemens Sialm, Scott Weisbenner, "Portfolio Concentration and the Performance of Individual Investors", 43 Journal of Finance & Qualitative Analysis 613 (2008): The authors found that where individual investors had the means to diversify across many stocks, those that focused on a few outperformed those who diversified across many stocks.
- Dimmock, Stephen G.; Huang, Jiekun; Weisbenner, Scott J, "Give Me Your Tired, Your Poor, Your High-Skilled Labor: H-1B Lottery Outcomes and Entrepreneurial Success", Management Science vol: 68, issue 9, 2022
