= Michael Krasny =

Michael Krasny may refer to:

- Michael Krasny (talk show host) (born 1944), American journalist, host of the radio talk show Forum
- Michael Krasny (businessman), American businessman, founder of CDW
