= Melko =

Melko may refer to:

- Joshua Melko (fl. from 2014), American scientist and chemistry professor
- Paul Melko (born 1968), American science-fiction author
- Melko Čingrija (1873–1949), Yugoslav politician

== See also ==
- Morgoth, originally Melkor, a fictional character in J. R. R. Tolkien's Middle-earth legendarium
