= Dutch Ethical Policy =

Dutch East Indies colonial government policy

The Dutch Ethical Policy (Dutch: ethische politiek, Indonesian: politik etis) was the official policy of the colonial government of the Dutch East Indies (present-day Indonesia) during the four decades from 1901 (under the Kuyper cabinet) until the Japanese occupation of 1942. In 1901, Dutch Queen Wilhelmina announced that the Netherlands accepted an ethical responsibility for the welfare of their colonial subjects. The announcement was a sharp contrast with the former official doctrine that Indonesia was a win-gewest (region for making a profit) and also marked the start of modern development policy. Other colonial powers talked of a civilising mission, which mainly involved spreading their culture to the colonised peoples.

The policy emphasised improvement in material living conditions. It suffered, however, from severe underfunding, inflated expectations, and the lack of acceptance in the Dutch colonial establishment. The policy had mostly ceased to exist by 1930, during the Great Depression.

== Formulation ==
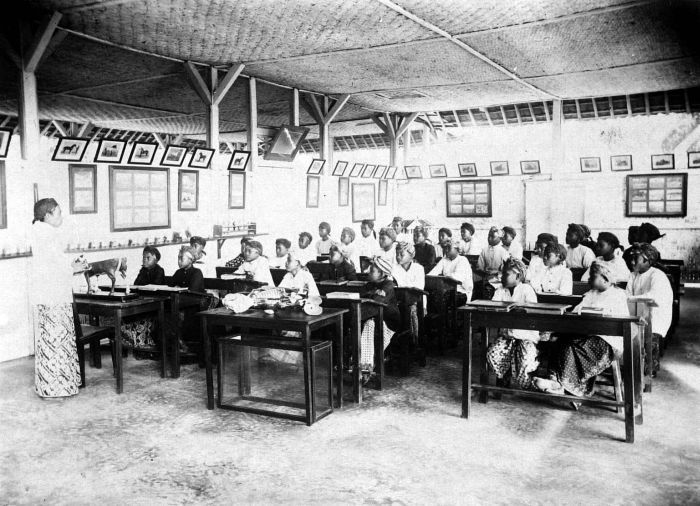
Students in an agricultural school for Indonesians in Java, built during the period

In 1899, the liberal Dutch lawyer Conrad Theodor van Deventer published an essay in the Dutch journal De Gids that claimed that the colonial Government had a moral responsibility to return the wealth that the Dutch had received from the East Indies to the indigenous population.

The journalist Pieter Brooshooft (1845–1921), wrote about the moral duty of the Dutch to provide more for the peoples of the East Indies. With the support of socialists and concerned middle-class Dutch, he campaigned against what he saw as the unjustness of the colonial surplus. He described the Indies indigenous peoples as "childlike" and in need of assistance, not oppression. Newspapers were one of the few media for the East Indies to communicate to the Dutch Parliament, and as editor of the De Locomotief, the largest Dutch-language newspaper in the East Indies, he published writing by Snouck Hurgronje on understanding Indonesians.

Brooshooft sent reporters across the archipelago to report on local developments; they reported on poverty, crop failure, famine, and epidemics in 1900. Lawyers and politicians supportive of Brooshooft's campaigning had an audience with Queen Wilhelmina and argued that the Netherlands owed the peoples of the Indies a 'debt of honour'.

In 1901, the Queen, under the advice of her prime minister of the Christian Anti-Revolutionary Party, Abraham Kuyper, formally declared a benevolent "Ethical Policy", which was aimed at bringing progress and prosperity to the East Indies. The Dutch conquest had brought them together as a single colonial entity by the early 20th century, which was fundamental to the policy's implementation.

Proponents of the policy argued that financial transfers should not be made to the Netherlands if the conditions of the indigenous people on the archipelago were poor.

== Aims ==
Supporters of the policy were concerned about the social and cultural conditions holding back the native population. They tried to raise awareness among the natives of the need to free themselves from the fetters of the feudal system and to develop themselves along Western lines.

On 17 September 1901, in her speech from the throne before the States-General, the newly crowned Queen Wilhelmina formally articulated the new policy that the Dutch government had a moral obligation to the native people of the Dutch East Indies. That could be summarised in the three policies of irrigation, transmigration, and education.

=== Irrigation ===
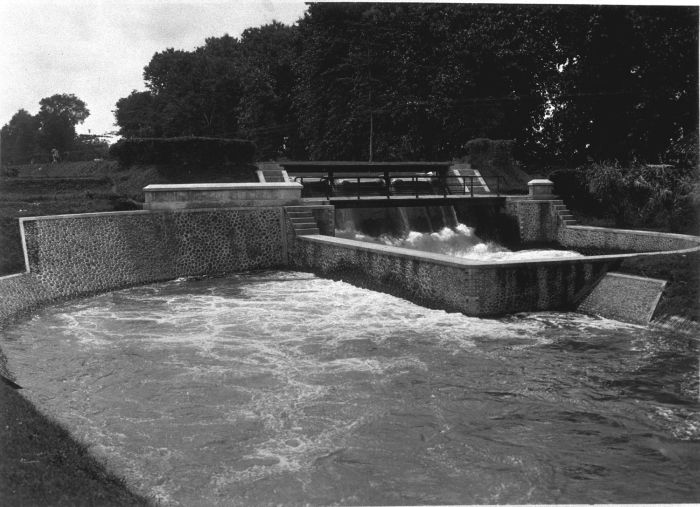
Irrigation waterworks in Jember, East Java, built c. 1927–1929.

The policy promoted efforts to improve a lot of the ordinary people through irrigation programmes, the introduction of banking services for the native population, and subsidies for native industries and handicrafts.

=== Transmigration ===
The policy first introduced the concept of transmigration from the overpopulated Java to the less densely populated areas of Sumatra and Kalimantan with government-sponsored schemes from 1905 onwards. However, the number of people moved during the period of the policy was a tiny fraction of the increase in population in Java during the same period.

=== Education ===
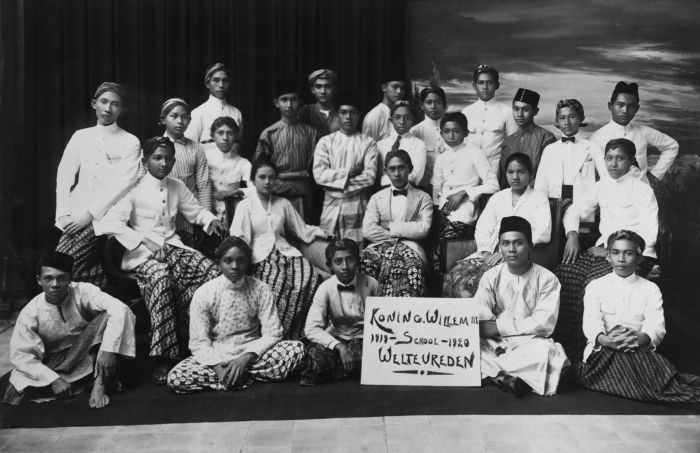
Group portrait of indigenous children attending the King Willem III School, Weltevreden, Batavia, 1919-1920

The opening of Western education to indigenous Indonesians began only in the early 20th century. In 1900, only 1,500 went to European schools compared to 13,000 Europeans. By 1928, 75,000 Indonesians had completed Western primary school and nearly 6,500 had completed secondary school, though this remained a small proportion of the population.

== Assessment ==
The policy was the first serious effort to create programmes for economic development in the tropics. It differed from the "civilising mission" of other colonial powers in emphasising material welfare, rather than a transfer of culture. The policy's educational component was mainly technical, as it did not aim at creating enlightened Dutch people of colour. The policy foundered on two problems. Firstly, the budgets allocated to the policy's programmes were never sufficient to achieve its aims, with the result that many colonial officials became disillusioned with the possibility of achieving lasting progress. The financial stringencies of the Great Depression put a definitive end to the policy. Secondly, the educational programmes of the policy contributed significantly to the Indonesian National Revival, which gave Indonesians the intellectual tools to organise and articulate their objections to colonial rule. As a result, many in the colonial establishment saw the policy as a mistake, which was counter to Dutch interests.

== Notable supporters ==
- Willem Anthony Engelbrecht

== See also ==
- Cultivation System
- Dutch East Indies
- Dutch Empire
- History of Indonesia
- Indonesian National Revolution
