= Theodore Sougiannis =

American economist

Theodore Sougiannis is an American economist. He is currently Professor Emeritus of Accountancy at Gies College of Business, University of Illinois, where he served as KPMG Distinguished Professor of Accountancy from 2006 until 2022.
