= Wiborada =

Swiss noblewoman and Catholic saint

Saint Wiborada
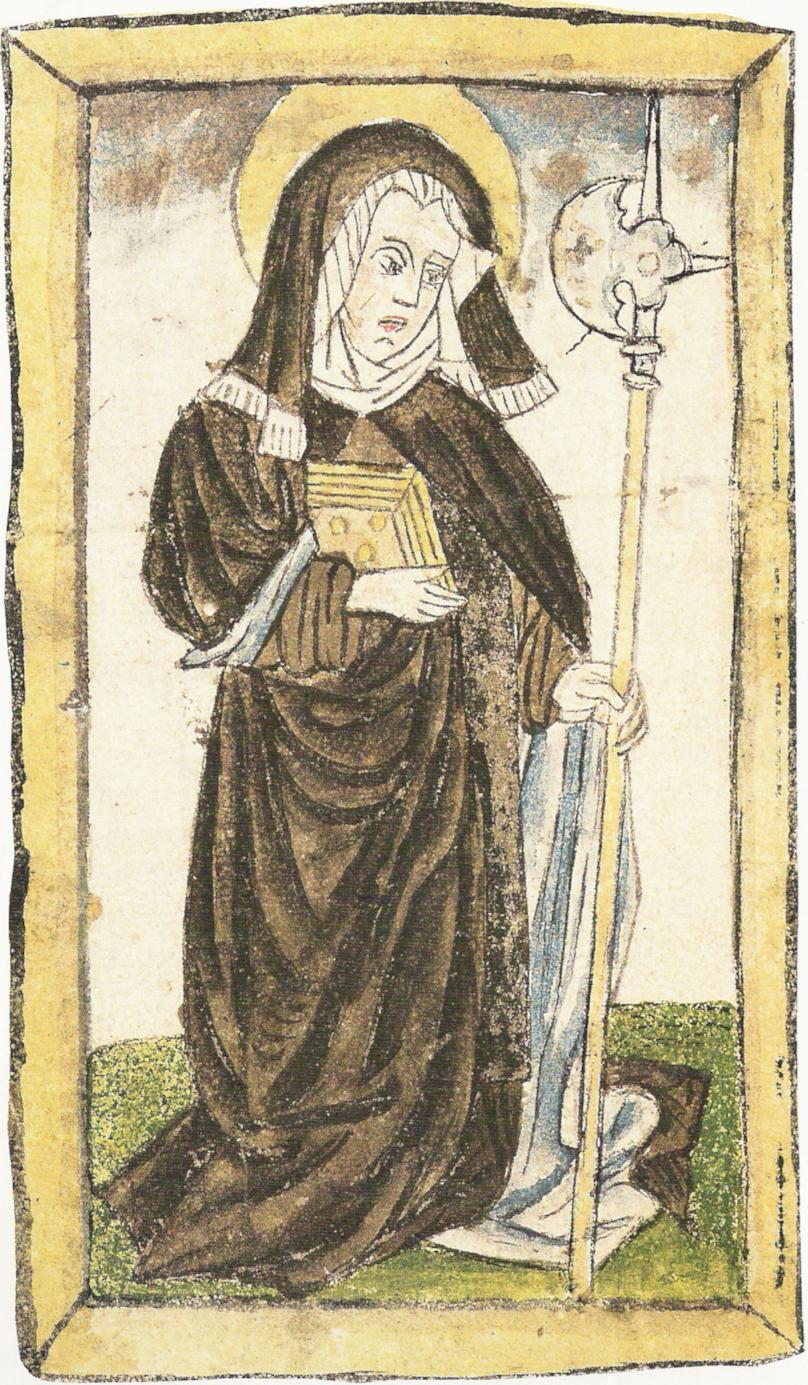
- Saint Wiborada from the Cimelia Sangallensia, c. 1430

Anchorite and Martyr
- Born: 9th century present-day Canton of Aargau, Switzerland
- Died: 926; Abbey of Saint Gall, St. Gallen, present-day Switzerland
- Venerated in: Catholic Church; Eastern Orthodox Church
- Canonized: 1047 by Pope Clement II
- Feast: 2 May
- Attributes: a Benedictine nun holding a book and axe
- Patronage: libraries, librarians (in Switzerland and Germany)

Wiborada of St. Gall (also Guiborat, Weibrath or Viborata; Alemannic: Wiberat) (died 926) was a member of the Swabian nobility in what is present-day Switzerland. She was an anchoress, Benedictine nun, and martyr.

== Biography ==
There are two biographies of Wiborada: one by Hartmann, a monk of St. Gall, written between 993 and 1047 (BHL 8866); and another written between 1072 and 1076 by the monk Herimannus (BHL 8867).

Recent research by Peter Erhart, head of the Abbey Archives of St. Gall, has provided new evidence concerning Wiborada's family background and suggests that she originated from Jonschwil or its immediate surroundings, in the medieval Thurgau (now in the canton of St. Gallen). Erhart identified her younger brother Hitto as the scribe of two charters dated 1 April 900 and 12 November 904, recording transfers of property to the Church of St. Martin in Jonschwil. Hitto also served as a priest at this church before entering the Abbey of Saint Gall as a monk in 906. Erhart argues that this close association with Jonschwil points to the siblings' origins in the area, since early medieval clerics frequently served in their home regions.

Erhart also identified an entry dating from around 900 in the confraternity book of Reichenau Abbey, containing the names Wiberat and Rachilt. On palaeographical grounds, he considers it likely that Wiborada wrote the entry herself. This provides early documentary evidence of her association with Rachilt, who later became her close companion and fellow anchoress, and suggests that Wiborada was able to write as well as read.

Wiborada was born to a wealthy noble family in Swabia. When they invited the sick and poor into their home, Wiborada proved a capable nurse. Her brother Hatto became a priest. A pilgrimage to Rome influenced Hatto to decide to become a monk at the Abbey of Saint Gall, a decision which Wiborada supported. After the death of their parents, Wiborada joined Hatto and became a Benedictine at the Abbey of Saint Gall. Wiborada became settled at the monastery and Hatto taught her Latin so that she could chant the Liturgy of the Hours. There, she occupied herself by making Hatto's clothes and helping to bind many of the books in the monastery library.

At this time, it appears that Wiborada was charged with some type of serious infraction or wrongdoing, and was subjected to the medieval practice of ordeal by fire to prove her innocence. Although she was exonerated, the embarrassment probably influenced her next decision: withdrawing from the world and becoming an ascetic.

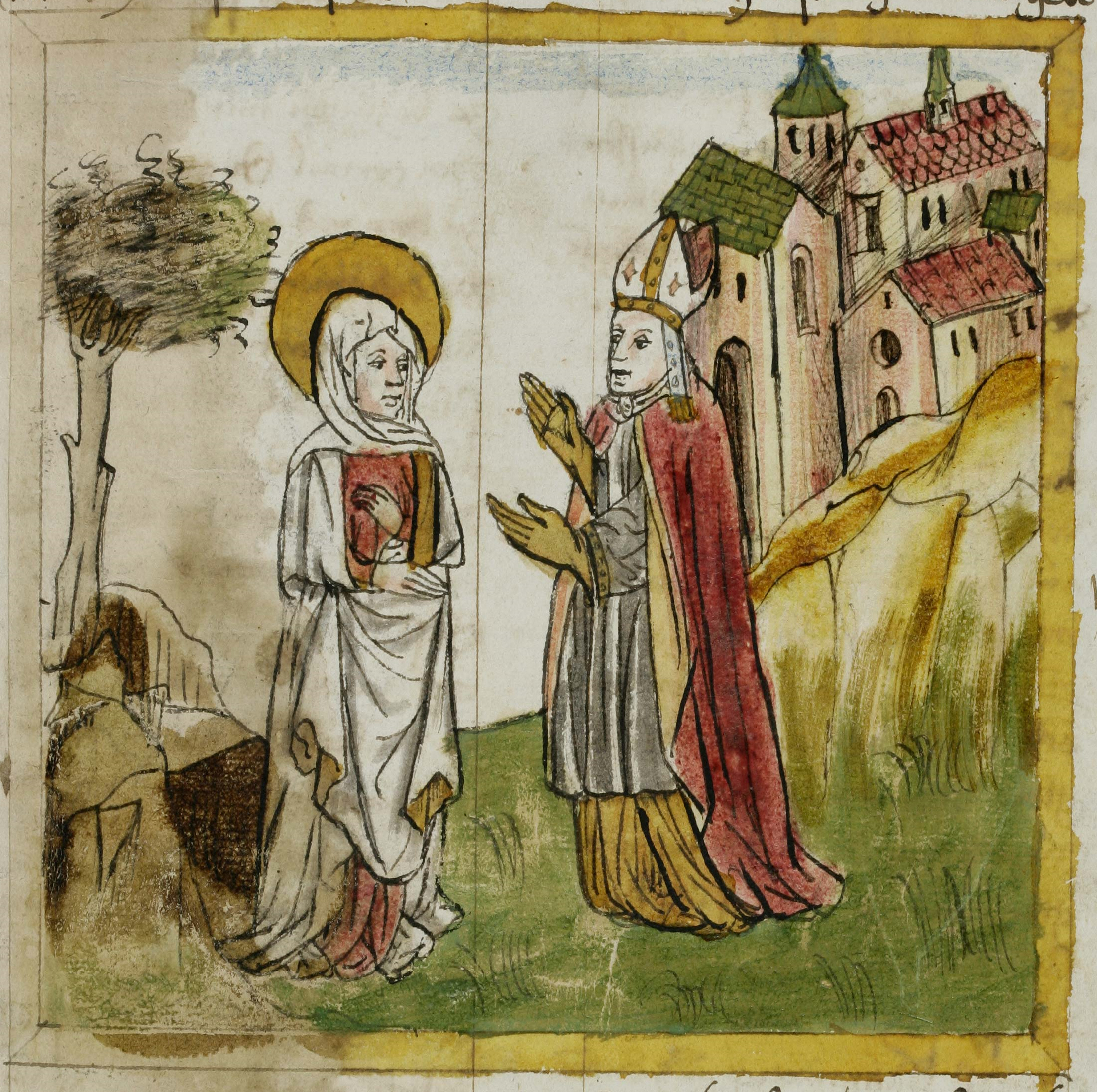
Wiborada with Solomon III, Bishop of Constance

When she petitioned to become an anchoress, Solomon III, Bishop of Konstanz, arranged for her to stay in a cell next to the church of Saint George near the monastery, where she remained for four years before relocating to a cell adjoining the church of Magnus of Füssen in 891.

She became renowned for her austerity, and was said to have a gift of prophecy, both of which drew admirers and hopeful students. One of these, a woman named Rachildis, whom Wiborada had cured of a disease, joined her as an anchoress. A young student at St. Gall, Ulrich, is said to have visited Wiborada often. She supposedly prophesied his elevation to the episcopate of Augsburg.

=== Martyrdom ===
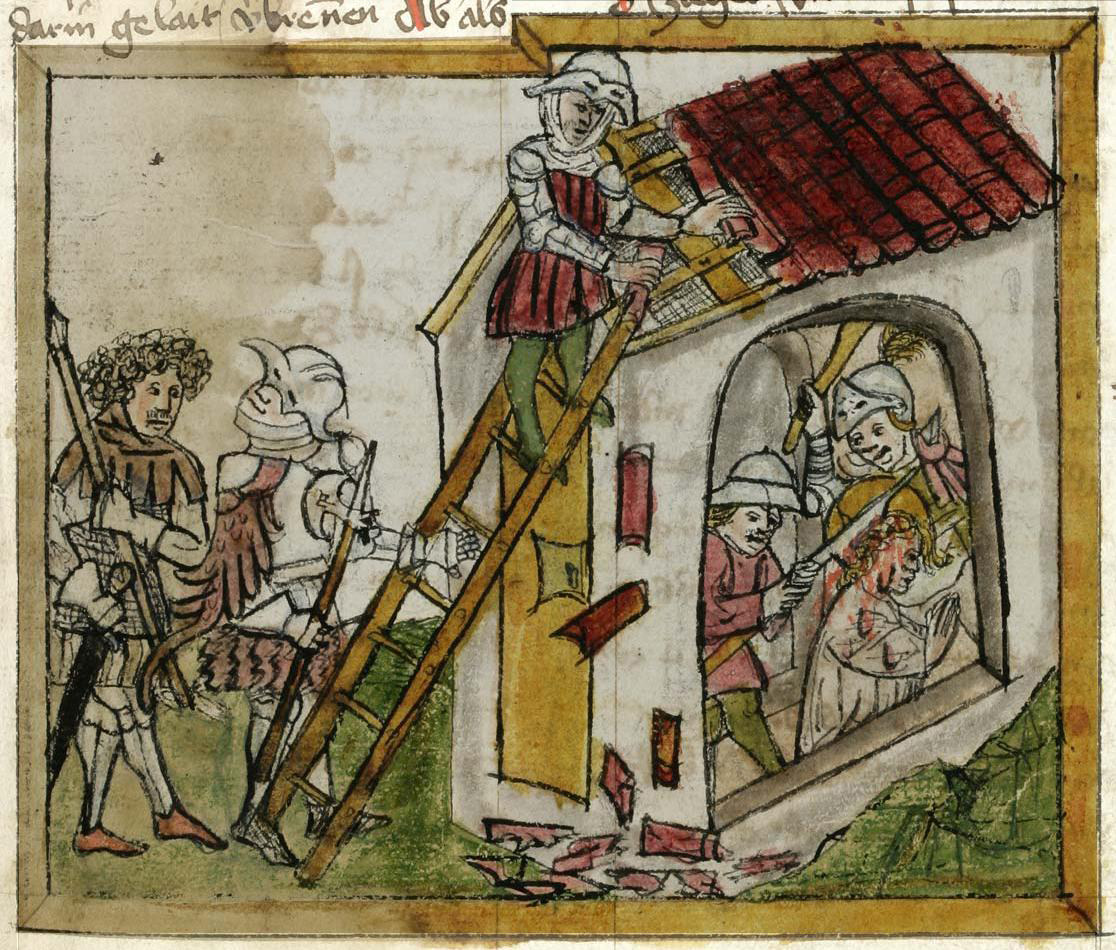
The Martyrdom of Saint Wiborada, c. 1451.

In 925, she predicted a Hungarian invasion of her region. Her warning allowed the priests and religious of St. Gall and St. Magnus to hide the books and wine and escape into caves in nearby hills. The most precious manuscripts were transferred to the monastery at Reichenau Island. However, the main refuge castle for the monks and the abbot was the Waldburg in the Sitterwood. Her abbot, Engilbert, urged Wiborada to escape to safety, but she refused to leave her cell.

In 926, the Magyar marauders reached St. Gall. They burned down St. Magnus and broke into the roof of Wiborada's cell. Upon finding her kneeling in prayer, they clove her skull with a fokos (shepherd's axe). Her companion Rachildis was not killed, and lived another 21 years, during which her disease returned. She spent the rest of her life learning patience through suffering. Wiborada's refusal to leave her cell and the part she played in saving the lives of the priests and religious of her convent have merited her the title of martyr.

== Veneration ==
Wiborada was formally canonized by the Holy See, by Pope Clement II in 1047. Her feast day is 2 May. In Switzerland, Wiborada is considered the patron saint of libraries and librarians. In art, she is commonly represented holding a book to signify the library she saved, and an axe, which signifies the manner of her martyrdom. The axe with which she is commonly depicted is in fact anachronistic, being a halberd, which did not come into existence until the 15th century.
