= Joshua Melko =

American scientist

- Born: Joshua Jennings Melko
- Education: Penn State University (PhD); University of Florida (BS)
- Known for: online teaching
- Scientific career
- Fields: Engineering; Chemistry; Physical Chemistry; kinetics; vacuum; catalysis; nanomaterials; atmospheric chemistry; higher education; STEM; Online learning
- Workplaces: University of North Florida; Boston College; Air Force Research Laboratory; Penn State University
- Thesis: Photoelectron Spectroscopy Investigations on the Stability, Energetics, and Dynamics of Gas-phase p-block Clusters (2011)
- Doctoral advisor: Albert Welford Castleman Jr.
- Website: melko.domains.unf.edu

Joshua Melko (/mɛlkoʊ/) is an American scientist and chemistry professor. Melko is an associate professor of physical chemistry in the Department of Chemistry at University of North Florida. His research focuses on studying gas phase chemical reactions that are relevant to the atmospheres of Earth and Mars which provides insights into reactions critical in global warming, ground-to-space communication, and habitability of other planets. Melko is best known for his innovative online teaching methods on the popular streaming platform Twitch.

== Education ==
Melko attended Florida Atlantic University for his chemistry studies during 2001 to 2003. He earned his B.S. degree in chemistry with a physics minor from The University of Florida in 2005 and his Ph.D. in physical chemistry from The Pennsylvania State University in 2011. In 2014, Melko completed his post-doctoral work in the Plasma Chemistry group of Air Force Research Laboratory, where he served as a National Research Council Postdoctoral Fellow.

== Teaching ==
Melko teaches Introduction to Chemistry, General Chemistry II, Physical Chemistry I (Thermodynamics), Physical Chemistry II (Quantum Mechanics), and associated laboratory courses at University of North Florida. Melko's teaching pedagogy is technology focused, exploring emerging platforms such as Twitch, Discord and incorporating new hardware/software approaches to increase student engagement. The method became increasingly effective and successful which was featured in The Spinnaker.

== Career and research ==
Melko's research expertise is in gas phase kinetics with applications in catalysis, fuels, and atmospheric processes. His research focuses on characterizing the energetics and reactivity of transition metal molecules. Specific areas of interest include quantifying the degree to which orbital hybridization, spin crossings, and charge locality play a role in reactivity and energetic stability.

Melko joined the University of North Florida (UNF) department of chemistry as a tenure-track assistant professor in August 2014. Through his graduate and post-doctoral work, he became proficient at building custom scientific instrumentation, using modern computational chemistry techniques, and making statistical models. At UNF, He combines these experiences to provide fundamental understanding of the atomic rearrangements, known as mechanisms, that take place during a chemical reaction. These mechanisms are usually difficult to study due to the presence of other molecules and the short timescales of atomic motion. To address this, he has built a custom gas phase mass spectrometer at UNF that can isolate an ion while exposing it to a neutral atom or molecule.

== Professional activities ==
Melko's service efforts involve work in science policy, science communication, and activities through his professional organizations.

Melko became a Twitch Affiliate Educational Streamer in an effort to make his office hours more accessible to his students. During which time, he streamed lectures, science news, politics and in-real-life content which attracted thousands of followers worldwide. It became one of his most successful endeavours on his quest of innovative teaching by exploring emerging modern technological platforms.

== Honours ==
Since 2021, Melko started serving as a Congressional Fellow of the American Chemical Society, where he works on Capitol Hill to provide high quality information and valuable advisory on science-related policy issues.

In 2018, Melko received UNF Outstanding Undergraduate Teaching Award and UNF Research Enhancement Plan Course Release Award.

In 2015, Melko received UNF Dean's Leadership Council Faculty Fellowship Award.

Melko is affiliated with American Association for the Advancement of Science, American Chemical Society and American Society for Mass Spectrometry.

== Publications ==
- Activation of Methane by FeO^{+}: Determining Reaction Pathways through Temperature-Dependent Kinetics and Statistical Modeling
- Further Insight into the Reaction FeO^{+} + H_{2} → Fe^{+} + H_{2}O: Temperature Dependent Kinetics, Isotope Effects, and Statistical Modeling
- Temperature Dependence of the OH^{–} + CH_{3}I Reaction Kinetics. Experimental and Simulation Studies and Atomic-Level Dynamics
- Al_{n}Bi Clusters: Transitions Between Aromatic and Jellium Stability
- Evaluation of the exothermicity of the chemi-ionization reaction Sm + O → SmO^{+} + e^{−}
- Effect of Charge and Composition on the Structural Fluxionality and Stability of Nine Atom Tin− Bismuth Zintl Analogues
- Iron cation catalyzed reduction of N 2 O by CO: gas-phase temperature dependent kinetics
- Spin-inversion and spin-selection in the reactions FeO++ H 2 and Fe++ N 2 O
- Photoelectron imaging of small aluminum clusters: quantifying s–p hybridization
- Combined Experimental and Theoretical Study of Al_{n}X (n = 1−6; X = As, Sb) Clusters: Evidence of Aromaticity and the Jellium Model

== See also ==
- Educational technology
- Digital media in education
- Distance education
- Online learning in higher education
- Online lecture
- Online tutoring
- E-mentoring
- Social media in education
- Online streamer
- Twitch (service)
- Discord (software)
- Stephen Wolfram
