= Wilma Vaught =

United States Air Force General

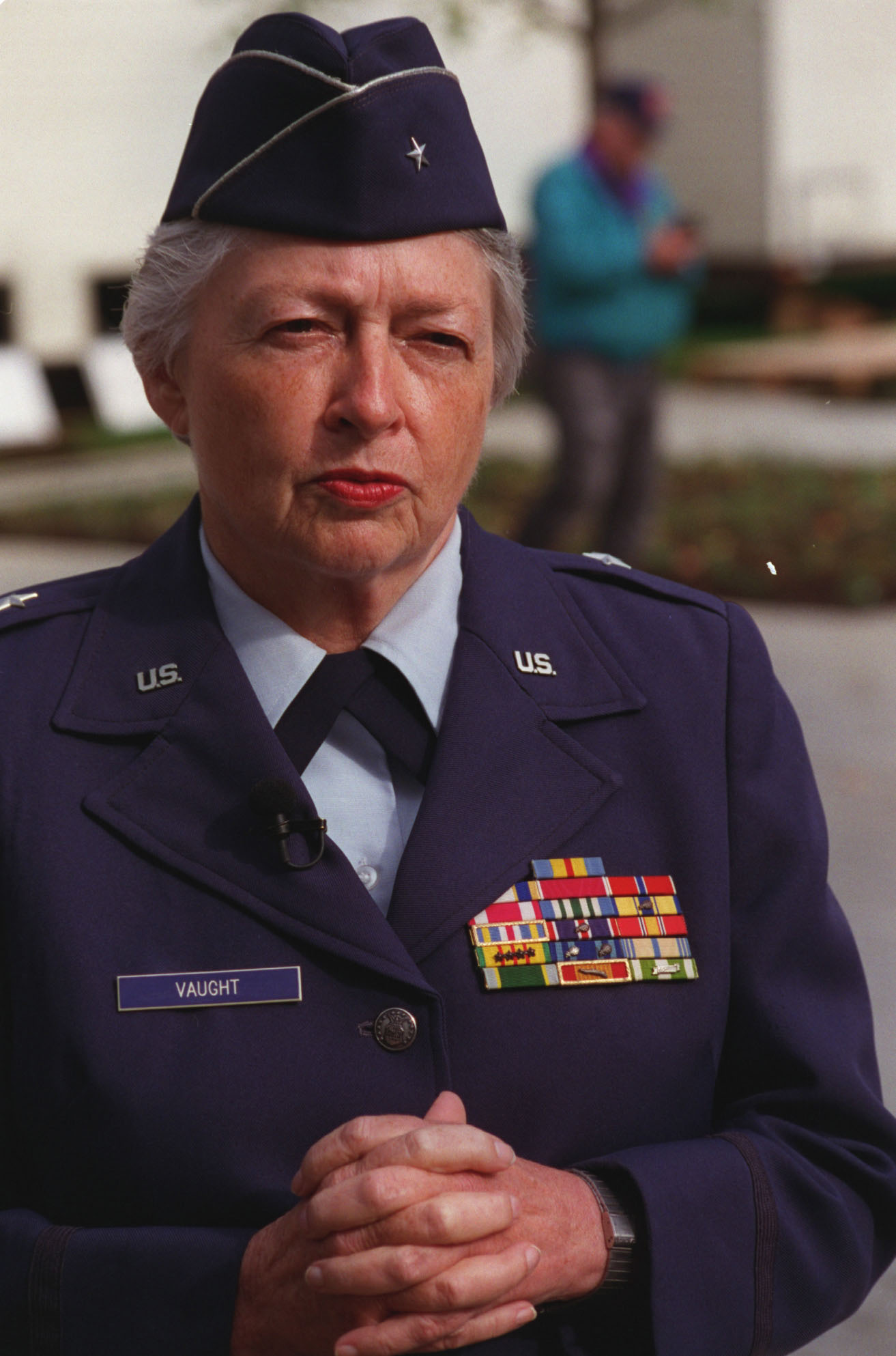
- Vaught in 1997
- Born: March 15, 1930 (age 96); Pontiac, Michigan, U.S.
- Military career
- Allegiance: United States
- Branch: United States Air Force
- Service years: 1957–1985
- Rank: Brigadier General
- Commands: United States Military Entrance Processing Command
- Conflicts: Vietnam War
- Awards: Presidential Medal of Freedom; Defense Distinguished Service Medal; Air Force Distinguished Service Medal; Legion of Merit; Bronze Star Medal; Meritorious Service Medal; Joint Service Commendation Medal; Air Force Commendation Medal (2)

Wilma L. Vaught (born March 15, 1930) is a retired U.S. Air Force brigadier general. She was the first woman to deploy with an Air Force bomber unit, and the first woman to reach the rank of brigadier general from the comptroller field.

== Education ==
Vaught graduated from the University of Illinois College of Business in 1952. She received her Master of Business Administration from the University of Alabama in Tuscaloosa in 1968. In August 1972, she became the first female Air Force officer to attend the Industrial College of the Armed Forces at Fort Lesley J. McNair.

== Military career ==
Vaught joined the military in the 1950s when there were strong restrictions on the number of women who could be in the military and the capacity in which they could serve. Some of these policies changed in 1967 due to an increased need for human resources caused by the Vietnam War. Vaught then became an officer and was deployed to Vietnam.

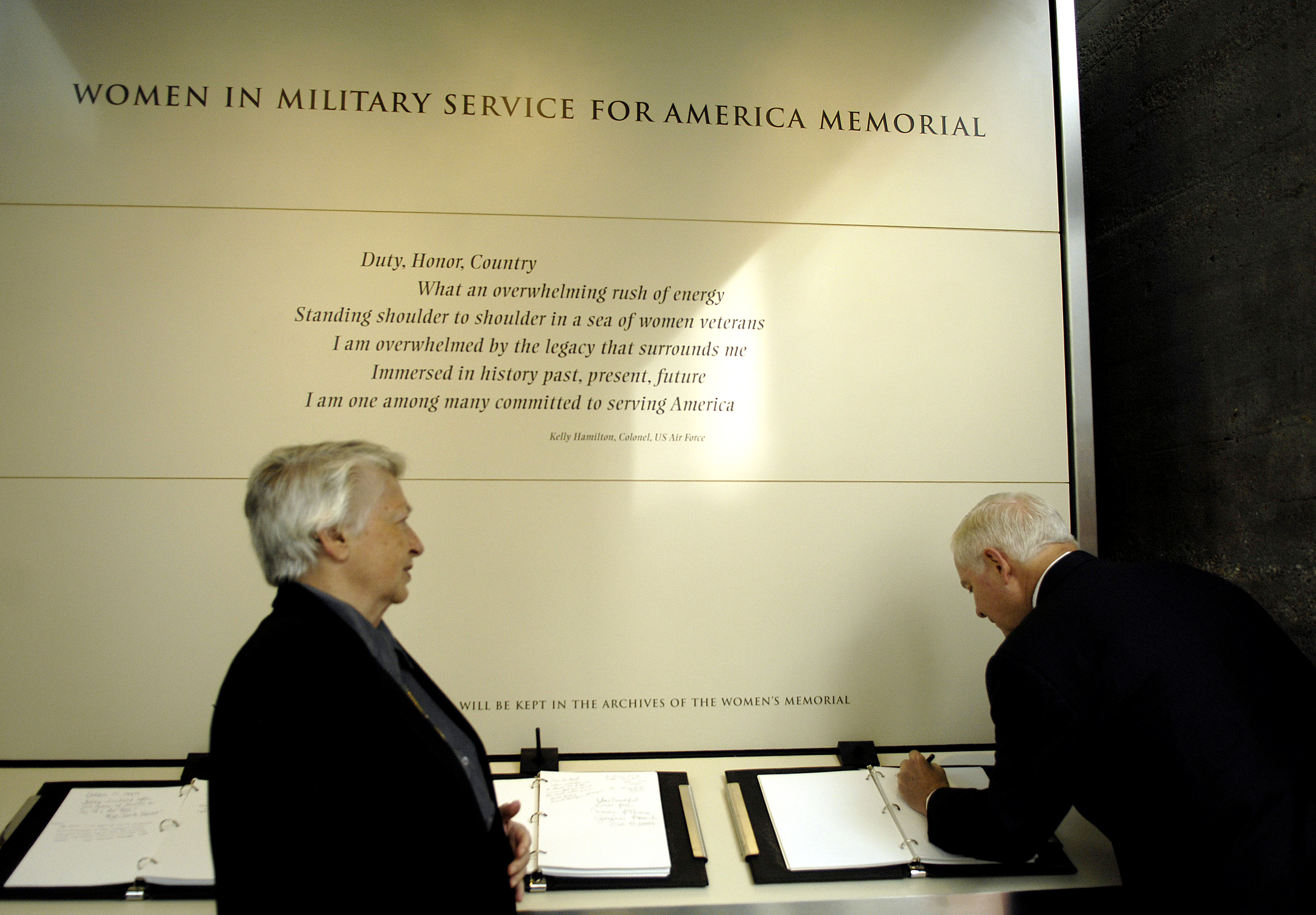
Vaught with Defense Secretary Robert Gates at Arlington National Cemetery in 2007

In January 1957, Vaught was commissioned a second lieutenant following her completion of Officer Training School at Lackland Air Force Base in San Antonio. She then spent three months as a student at the Statistical Services Officers' Course at Sheppard Air Force Base, Texas. In September 1957, she was assigned to the 805th Air Base Group, Barksdale Air Force Base, as chief of the Data Services Branch and, as an additional duty, commanded the Women's Air Force Squadron Section. Vaught served at Zaragoza Air Base, Spain, as chief of the Management Analysis Division, 3974th Combat Support Group, from April 1959 to April 1963.

Returning to the United States, she then was assigned to the 306th Combat Support Group at McCoy Air Force Base, Florida, as chief of the Data Services Division. She later became chief of the Management Analysis Division for the 306th Bombardment Wing (Heavy) at McCoy. During this period, the general became the first woman to deploy with a Strategic Air Command operational unit when she served a temporary duty tour as executive officer and chief of the Management Analysis Division, 4133rd Provisional Bombardment Wing at Andersen Air Force Base, Guam, during Operation Arc Light.

From June 1967 to September 1968, Vaught was a graduate student at the University of Alabama. Her next year was spent as a management analyst in the Office of the Deputy Chief of Staff, Comptroller, Military Assistance Command, Vietnam (MACV), in Saigon, Republic of Vietnam. Upon completion of her Southeast Asia tour of duty in November 1969, she was assigned to Headquarters Air Force Logistics Command, Wright-Patterson Air Force Base, Ohio, as chief of the Advanced Logistics Systems Plans and Management Group where she remained until July 1972. In August 1972, Vaught began attending the Industrial College of the Armed Forces.

From July 1973 until November 1977, Vaught was assigned to the Directorate of Management Analysis, Office of the Comptroller, Headquarters U.S. Air Force, Washington, D.C.

She was chief of the Cost Factors Branch and later became chief of the Security Assistance Division.

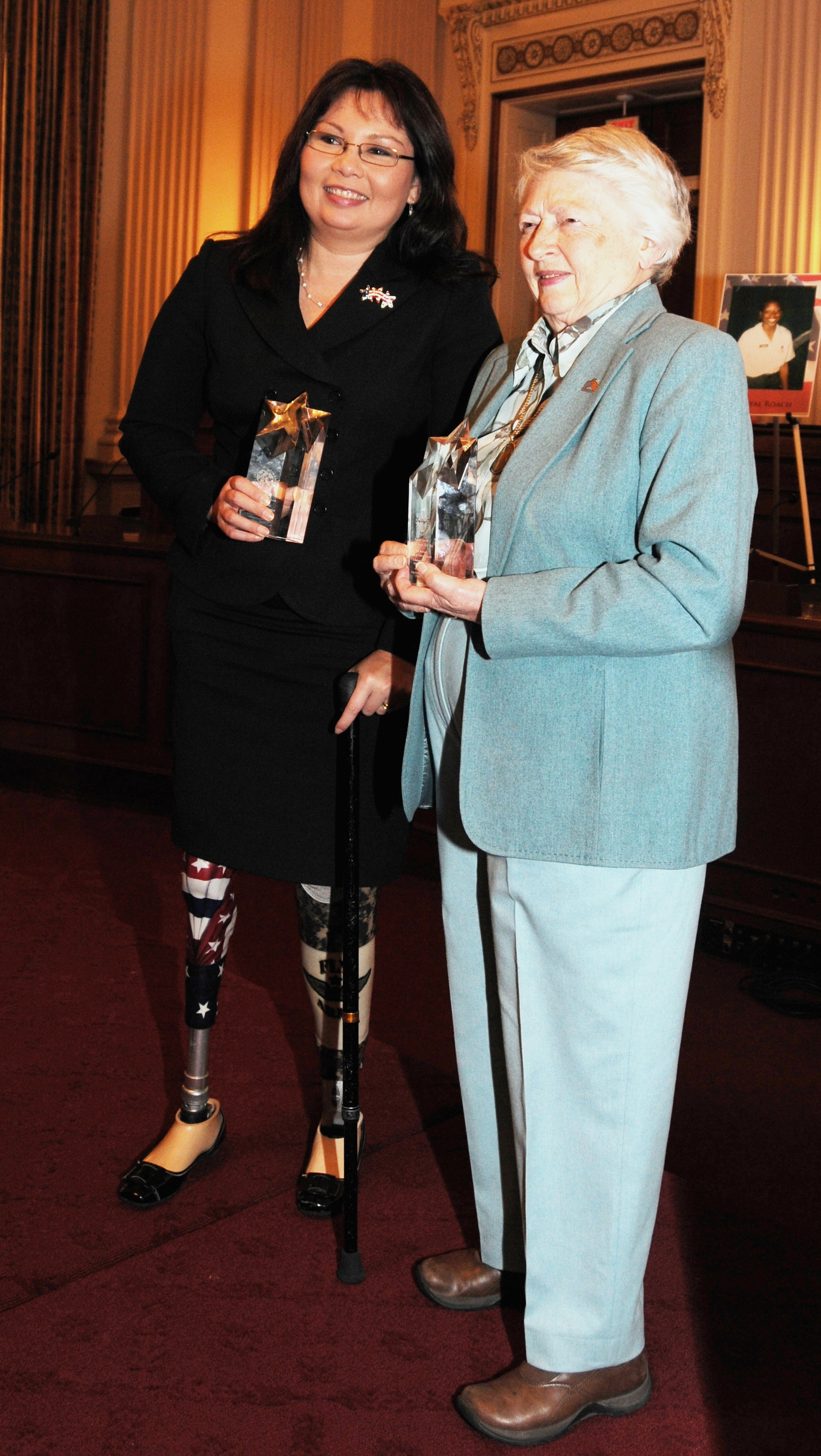
Tammy Duckworth and Vaught in 2010

Vaught was next assigned to Air Force Systems Command headquarters as director of programs and budget in the Office of the Deputy Chief of Staff, Comptroller. The general became the command's deputy chief of staff, comptroller, in March 1980. Vaught was promoted to brigadier general September 8, 1980, with date of rank September 6, 1980. She is the first woman selected for promotion to brigadier general in the comptroller career field. She assumed command of the U.S. Military Entrance Processing Command in June 1982.

The general served as the senior military representative to the Defense Advisory Committee on Women in the Services and was chairperson of the Committee of Women in the NATO Armed Forces. In 1983, General Vaught was given the Illini Achievement Award by the University of Illinois; an award given annually to recognize the accomplishments of distinguished graduates. She also served as president of the board of directors of the Pentagon Federal Credit Union from April 1976 to July 1982. She is the only woman in its history to hold this position.

Her military decorations and awards include the Defense Distinguished Service Medal, Air Force Distinguished Service Medal, Legion of Merit, Bronze Star Medal, Meritorious Service Medal, Joint Service Commendation Medal, Air Force Commendation Medal with oak leaf cluster, Air Force Outstanding Unit Award Ribbon with oak leaf cluster, National Defense Service Medal, Vietnam Service Medal with four service stars, Armed Forces Reserve Medal, Small Arms Expert Marksmanship Ribbon, Republic of Vietnam Gallantry Cross with palm, and Vietnam Campaign Medal.

== Activity after military career ==
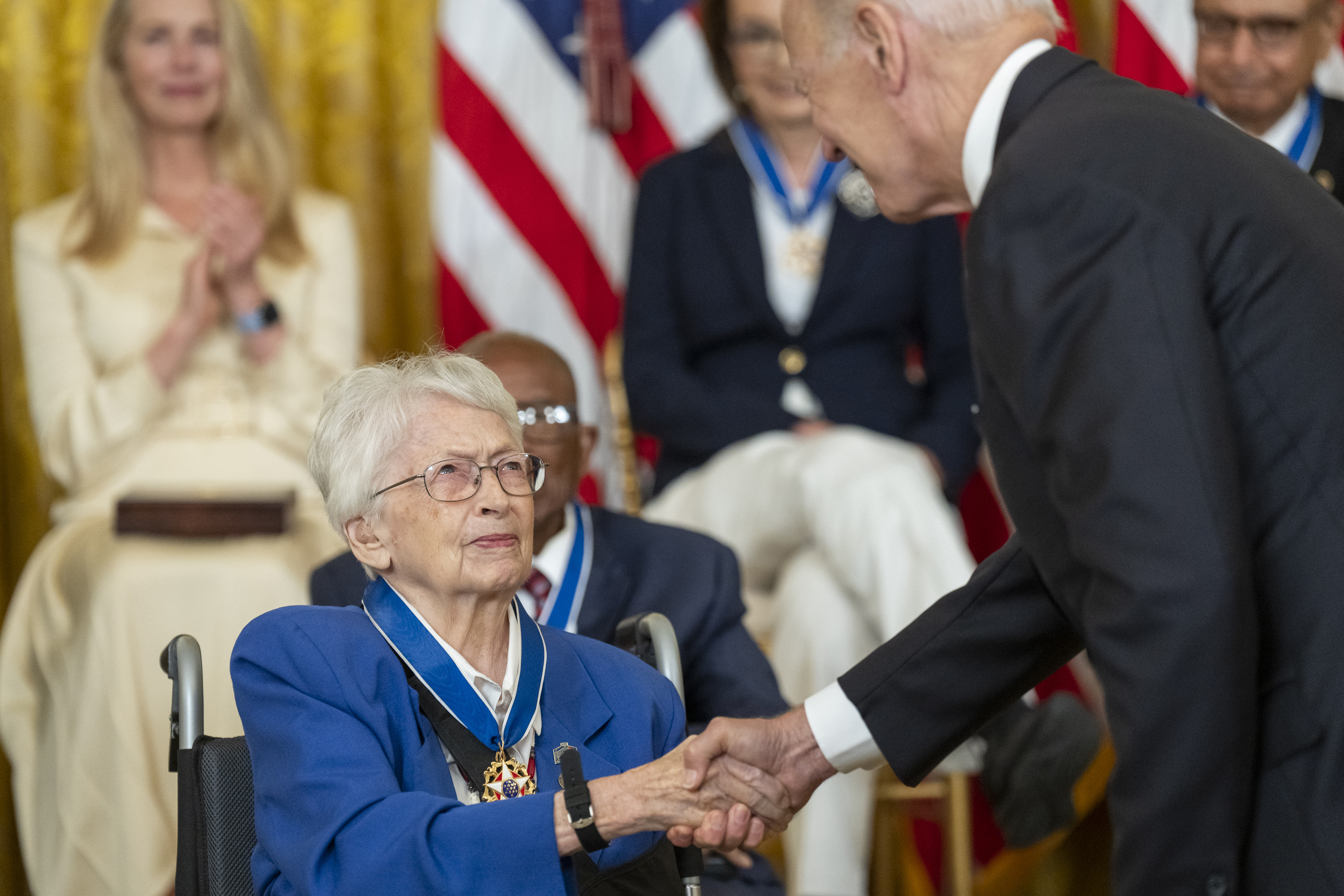
Vaught awarded the Presidential Medal of Freedom by President Joe Biden in July 2022

Vaught became concerned that the role of women in the military was going unnoticed, and pushed for a memorial as the leader of the Women in Military Service to America Memorial Foundation. This resulted in the Women in Military Service for America Memorial being built at the entrance to Arlington National Cemetery where there is also a painting of her displayed at the Women's Auxiliary created by artist Jared Seff.

Vaught received the Veterans of Foreign Wars' James E. Van Zandt Citizenship Award.

In 2000, Vaught was inducted into the National Women's Hall of Fame.

In 2010, Vaught was inducted into the U.S. Army Women's Foundation Hall of Fame.

On July 7, 2022, Vaught received the Presidential Medal of Freedom by President Joe Biden.

She is a member of the Daughters of the American Revolution.
