= Jack A. Goncalo =

Professor

Jack A. Goncalo is Professor of Business Administration and the Robert and Helen Seass Faculty Fellow at the Gies College of Business, University of Illinois, Urbana-Champaign.

Goncalo received his BS, MS and Ph.D. degrees from the University of California, Berkeley. He began his career at the School of Industrial and Labor Relations at Cornell University where he was the Proskauer Professor.

Professor Goncalo is known for his research on individual and team creativity which has been published in numerous academic journals and highlighted in Time Magazine, The New York Times, Forbes Magazine and CNN. Key findings from Professor Goncalo's research have shown that individualistic groups are more creative than collectivistic groups, the norm to be Politically Correct can boost the creativity of demographically diverse teams and that decision makers can be biased against creative ideas
