= Bernwig =

Abbot of Saint Gall, 837–c. 841

Bernwig was abbot of the Abbey of Saint Gall from 837 to 840/841. On 25 May 837, he was first documented as Abbot of Saint Gall. His date of birth is not known; he died on a 8 December of an unknown year.

Bernwig is often mentioned as registrar between 809 und 826. Before that, he is registered as witness. Between 827 and 831, he is mentioned as dean. An entry of the same name can be found in the confraternity book of Reichenau Abbey and in the book of vows (German Professbuch) of Saint Gall. According to Ratpert, Bernwig was elected abbot with the permission of Emperor Louis the Pious and by request of his predecessor Gozbert. Ratpert reports further that Bernwig sided with Lothar when Emperor Louis' sons found themselves in a dispute for succession. His partisanship with Lothar is said to have cost him the office of abbot. It can be assumed that Bernwig's dismissal between August 840 and April 841 occurred when Louis the German, after his victory over Lothar, became the ruler of Alemanni.
