= Academica =

Academica or Académica may refer to:

== Football clubs ==
- Académica de Coimbra (football), a Portuguese football club
  - Associação Académica de Coimbra (rugby union)
  - Associação Académica de Coimbra (volleyball)
  - Associação Académica de Coimbra (basketball)
- Académica da Brava, a football club in Cape Verde
- Académica da Calheta do Maio, a football club in Cape Verde
- Académica da Praia, a football club in Cape Verde
- Académica do Fogo, a football club in Cape Verde
- Académica do Mindelo, a football club in Cape Verde
- Académica do Porto Novo, a football club in Cape Verde
- Académica do Sal, a football club in Cape Verde
- Académica Operária, a football club in Cape Verde
- Académica Maputo, a sports club from Mozambique
- FC Academica Clinceni, a Romanian association football team
- AS Académica, a football club in East Timor
- Academica Futebol Club, an American soccer organization in Cheshire, Connecticut
- Academica SC, an American soccer team
- Académica Petróleos do Lobito, a football club in Angola

== Other uses ==
- Academica (charter school), in Florida, U.S.
- Academica (library), a Polish online interlibrary system
- Academica (Cicero), a 45 BCE philosophical work
- Academica Press, an American scholarly and trade publisher of non-fiction
- Academica, a subsidiary of Danish publishing house Gyldendal

== See also ==
- Coimbra Academic Association ('Associação Académica de Coimbra'), the students' union of the University of Coimbra
