= Willem Anthony Engelbrecht =

Dutch jurist and colonial administrator

Willem Engelbrecht
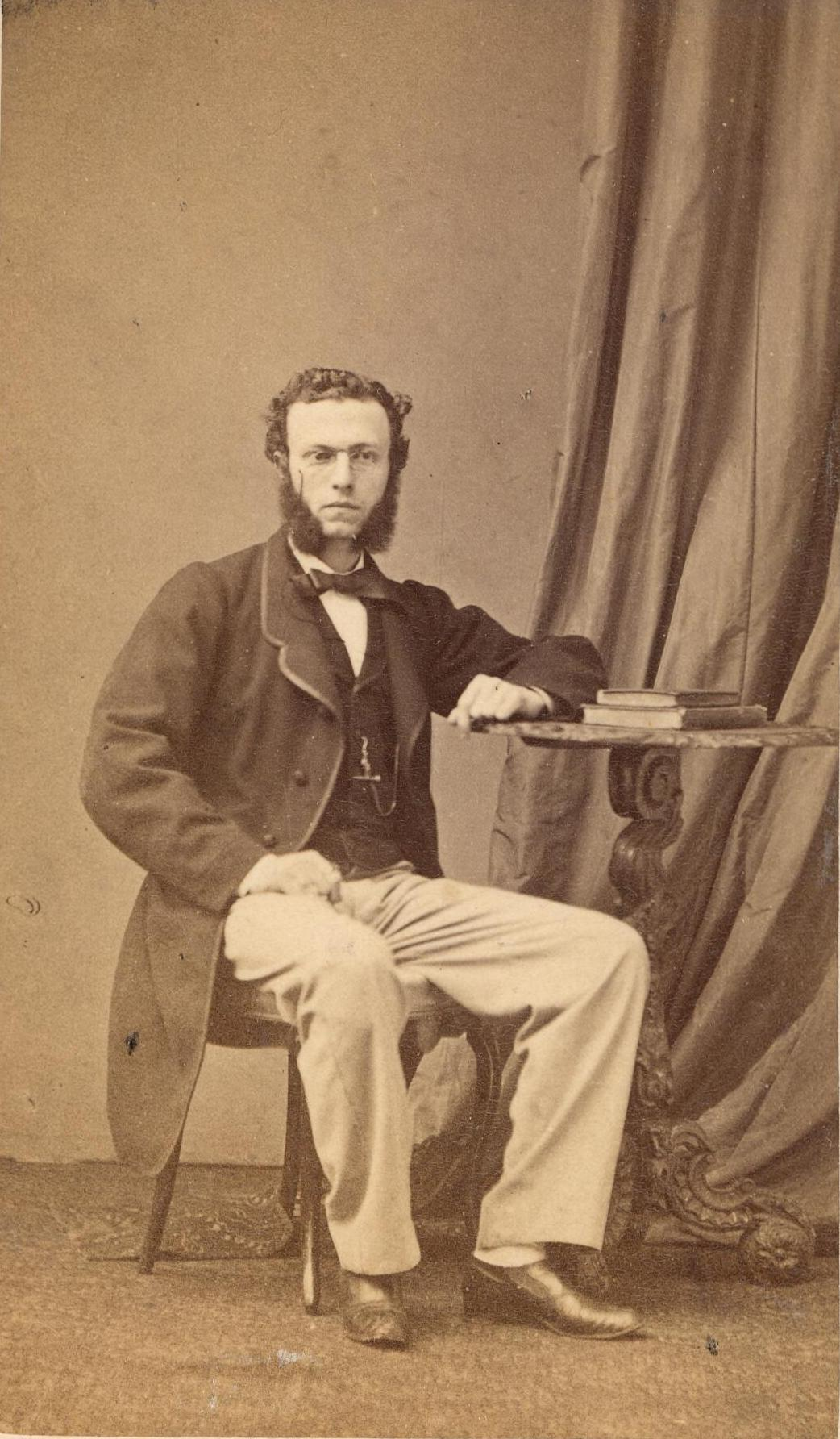
- Willem Anthony Engelbrecht (before 1874)
- Born: February 10, 1839; Batavia, Dutch East Indies
- Died: October 28, 1921 (aged 82); The Hague
- Occupation: Jurist
- Known for: Ethical politics (Ethical politics (Dutch East Indies))

Willem Anthony Engelbrecht, also known as Willem Anthonie Engelbrecht, (Batavia, now Jakarta, 10 February 1839 – The Hague, 28 October 1921) was a Dutch jurist and colonial administrator. He was one of the originators of the so-called "Dutch Ethical Policy" in the Dutch East Indies.

== Life ==
Engelbrecht was born in Batavia on 10 February 1839. He was the second son of Frederick Cornelis Engelbrecht (1804–1869), the main administrator of the Royal Netherlands Navy in the Dutch Indies (present Indonesia). His mother was Johanna Nons (1813–1894). The couple had five boys and four girls. All the Engelbrecht children either became or married administrators in the Dutch Indies.

Engelbrecht served as 2nd Lieutenant in the colonial army in the Southern and Eastern Department of Borneo. After his military service, Engelbrecht studied at Leiden University in the Netherlands. On 14 January 1862, he received his doctor utriusque juris with a thesis on colonial laws.

Engelbrecht married twice and had seven children. He retired in 1897 and returned to the Netherlands. He died at age 82 in The Hague on 28 October 1921.

== Career ==
Engelbrecht was one of the intellectual architects of the Dutch Ethical Policy, which eventually led to the independency of Indonesia. In his doctoral thesis (Leiden 1862), he stated that the Dutch should treat the Dutch indies as a state in its own right, but subordinated to the Netherlands. This opinion contradicted the general opinion, as expressed by the jurist H.A. Blume (1858), that the Dutch Indies were just a subordinated colony.

After completing his studies, Engelbrecht moved back to the Dutch East Indies to become a civil servant in the colonial administration. In 1862, he became a member of the Council of Justice at Semarang. He became the Council president in 1886, a function he occupied till 1891. In that year, Engelbrecht was appointed Director of the Department of Justice in the Dutch Indies. In this function he worked actively on the formation of the Dutch Indies as a state within the colonial empire of the Netherlands. In 1891, Governor-General Cornelis Pijnacker Hordijk assigned Engelbrecht with drafting a Governmental regulation on this issue.

In 1893 Engelbrecht became a member of the so-called Raad van Nederlandsch-Indië (Council of the Dutch East Indies), the de facto government of the colony. He served as Director of the Department of Justice.

In 1897 Engelbrecht retired from government service. However, he stayed active in the initiative of organising law in the Dutch Indies. His drafts led to an entire reorganisation of the Dutch Indies laws in 1900. In 1907, Engelbrecht published this codification in the Nederlandsch-Indisch Wetboek.

Over the years, Engelbrecht's code was re-edited several times and published in bigger and more complete editions. When Indonesia achieved independence in 1945, his work became the basis of its first legal code.

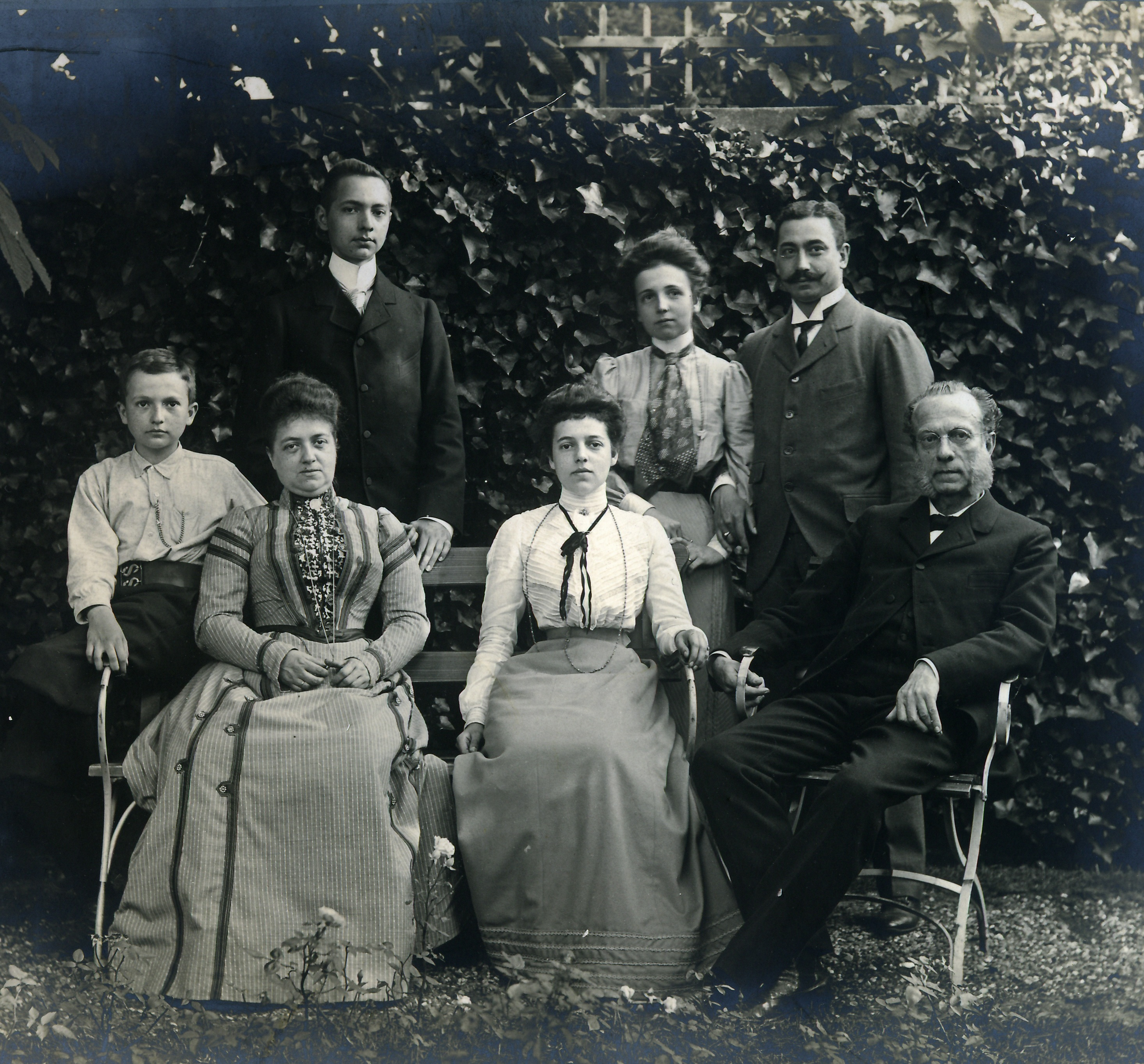
Willem A. Engelbrecht with his family, The Hague, 1905

== Family ==
Engelbrecht married Maria Annetta Emilie Canter Visscher (1839–1865) in The Hague in 1862. The couple had one son, Johannes Frederik Engelbrecht (1863–1911), who became a member of Supreme Court of the Dutch Indies.

Engelbrecht married Margaretha Pepfenhauser (1855–1946) in 1877. They had six children. Two of them died at an early age. The others were: Adolphine Henriette Engelbrecht (1878–1936), Willem Bernard Engelbrecht (1881–1955), Nisette Cornelie Engelbrecht (1882–1971) and Edwin Marie Louis Engelbrecht (1887–1960). Willem became a diplomat and Edwin a lawyer.

== Main publications ==
- W.A. Engelbrecht, Artikel 2 Reglement op het beleid der Regering van Nederlandsch-Indië, in verband met artikel 107, Regeringsreglement van Nederlandsch-Indië, en de Nederlandsche wetgeving op het Nederlanderschap. Leiden: Hazenberg 1862, 118p. (Diss. University of Leiden)
- W.A. Engelbrecht, De Nederlandsch-Indische Wetboeken: de Grondwet voor het Koningrijk der Nederlanden, het Reglement op het beleid der Regering van Nederlandsch-Indië en andere wetten, wettelijke verordeningen en besluiten, met verwijzing naar de op elk artikel betrekking hebbende Nederlandsch-Indische, Nederlandsche en Fransche wetsbepalingen, Semarang: A. Bisschop 1890 (over 20 editions, latest edition published in Bahasa Indonesian: Jakarta: Ichtiar Baru-Van Hoeve 1989)
