= Heitor Almeida =

Brazilian economist

Heitor Almeida is a Brazilian economist, focusing on mergers and acquisitions, financial constraints, international corporate finance, liquidity management, business groups, financial distress, corporate governance, and managerial decision-making. He is currently the Professor of Finance and Stanley C. and Joan J. Golder Chair in Corporate Finance at the University of Illinois.
