= Video lesson =

Video presenting educational material

A video lesson or lecture is a video which presents educational material for a topic which is to be learned.

The format may vary. It might be a video of a teacher speaking to the camera, photographs and text about the topic or some mixture of these. Animated video lessons, in particular, use engaging visuals and simplified explanations to help break down complex topics, making them especially effective in subjects like Science or Math. The Khan Academy has been successful in teaching mathematics using notes written using Yahoo!'s doodle pad with a voiceover by Salman Khan (educator). These were then loaded onto YouTube where they have been popular and influential. Such lectures are a key part of flip teaching in which the initial work of communicating the essentials of the topic is done by the video lesson.

A study shows that there is hardly any difference in correctly answered questions when students were divided into two groups that used either live lecture or video lecture. But there were some differences in subjective evaluation: 48% of students preferred live lessons, 27% preferred video lessons and 25% stated ‘neutral’. Another meta-study investigated more than 100 studies and find out that about 75% of the time, students learned better from the video. On average, the effects are small (about +2 marks) but consistently favour videos. Effects are much larger when videos replace books (+7 marks), or when videos are used to teach skills (+6 marks) instead of knowledge.

== See also ==
- Lecture
- Lesson
- Online lecture
