= Michael Mikhail =

American economist

Michael Mikhail is Dean Emeritus of the College of Business Administration at the University of Illinois at Chicago. Prior to assuming his role as dean in 2012, Mikhail was the KPMG Professor, and Director of the School of Accountancy at Arizona State University. At ASU, he was named a DC 100 Distinguished Scholar.

Mikhail received his BS and MAS (Accounting) degrees from the University of Illinois at Urbana-Champaign and an MBA and Ph.D. from the University of Chicago. He previously taught at the MIT Sloan School of Management where he was the inaugural holder of the Theodore T. Miller Chair and at Duke University's Fuqua School of Business where he received the Executive MBA Program's Excellence in Teaching Award.

Professor Mikhail's research interests are in the use of financial information by capital market participants, primarily securities analysts. His work examines the forecast accuracy of securities analysts and explores the determinants of analysts' forecasting ability, stock recommendation profitability, and the job consequences of poor performance. Mikhail has also studied the effects of earnings quality on market participants' reactions to other information provided by the firm and to the cost of capital. His research has appeared in the Journal of Accounting Research, The Accounting Review, the Journal of Accounting and Economics, the Journal of Financial Economics and the Journal of Accounting, Auditing and Finance.

Mikhail previously served as a member of The Accounting Review's editorial advisory and review board and has been an ad-hoc reviewer for several other academic journals. Before becoming an academic, he was a senior consultant with Arthur Andersen's Tax and Corporate Finance Practice in Chicago.
