= Online lecture =

An online lecture is an educational lecture designed to be posted online. Lectures are recorded to video, audio or both, then uploaded and made viewable on a designated site. Students may go to a certain designated site to view the lecture online at a time which is convenient for them. The lecture may also be available for live viewing online at the time it is recorded.

Traditionally, vocal education is possible only when the teacher and the pupil are together in the same room, where the teacher passes on the information in the same vicinity of the student. The development of the online lecture makes it possible so that the teacher and student no longer have to be in the same vicinity to teach and learn, respectively.

There are certain advantages to online lecturing. Students may access online lectures posted on their designated websites anywhere in the world, at any time they wish, as long as they have an internet connection. They can also be repeated for the sake of note taking. Studies have shown that students improve significantly in courses with online archived lectures. Studies have also noted that students' overall experience of a course has improved with the addition of online lectures. Online lecture may also one of the solutions in equalizing education for students. There are also disadvantages to online lecturing, namely the lack of face-to-face interaction, and the fact that students cannot easily contact their instructors unless a communications link is created. Additionally, attendance for in-class lectures may drop due to recorded lectures.

== Provider and lists ==
- Category:Tertiary educational websites

== See also ==
- Screencast
- Slidecast
- Video podcast
- Online video presentations
- MOOC
- Tertiary education
- Educational technology
- Video lesson
