= Kent Monroe =

American economist

Kent Bourdon Monroe was an American economist, focusing in information value of price to consumers.

Monroe earned a bachelor of arts in economics and mathematics from Kalamazoo College in 1960, master of business administration and marketing from Indiana University in 1961 and a doctorate in business administration in 1968 at the University of Illinois Urbana-Champaign. He taught at Glenville State College in West Virginia in 1963.

He was the Robert O. Goodykoontz Professor at Virginia Tech and Virginia State University, and was an Elected Fellow of Decision Sciences Institute.

Monroe joined the University of Illinois faculty in 1991 where he led the Marketing group for many years as the John M. Jones Distinguished Professor of Marketing and was Head of the Department of Business Administration from 1994 to 1999. He retired from Illinois in 2005.

In 2007, he was named a fellow of the Association for Consumer Research.

Monroe published the book Making Profitable Decisions in 1979, with the 3rd edition published in 2003, which has been translated into several languages. He was the editor of the Journal of Consumer Research from 1990-1993.

Kent Monroe died on February 23, 2025.
