= Engilbert I of Saint Gall =

Abbot of Saint Gall

Engilbert was for a short time (840/841) Abbot of Saint Gall. His dates of birth and death are unknown. Possibly, he died on a 22 January of an unknown year. An entry in the necrology of Saint Gall cannot definitely be assigned to this Engilbert.

== Term of office ==
Like his predecessor Bernwig, Engilbert supposedly decided on the wrong party to support in the battle of succession after Louis the Pious' death, taking Lothair's side. Lothair advanced but was finally defeated by his brother, Louis the German, at Fontenoy, Engilbert was removed from office in 841 by Louis, who had previously appointed him.
