= Michael Krasny (businessman) =

American businessman

- Born: 1952 or 1953 (age 72–73)
- Education: University of Illinois
- Occupation: Businessman
- Known for: Founder of CDW Corporation
- Spouse: Janet Krasny
- Children: 1

Michael Krasny (born 1952/1953) is an American billionaire businessman from Illinois. He is the founder and former chief executive officer of CDW Corporation, a direct seller of technical gadgets including computers and networking equipment.

== Early life ==
Krasny grew up in a Jewish family in Illinois. He graduated from the University of Illinois Gies College of Business in 1975. He worked as a Toyota car salesman at his father's auto dealership in Arlington Heights, Illinois. In 1981, he quit his job as a car salesman and took some classes in computer programming but being unsuccessful in finding steady work, Krasny was forced to sell his own computer for cash. He placed a $3 ad in the Chicago Tribune and ended up selling his computer for a $200 profit.

== Career and retirement ==
Seeing the great demand for computers, Krasny began buying computers to resell them eventually forming MPK Computers. A year later he changed the name to Computer Discount Warehouse (CDW) and steadily grew the business. In 1993, he took CDW public. Krasny retired in 2007 after selling the company to Madison Dearborn Partners for $7.3 billion. According to Forbes, his first caller from 1982 was still a customer as of 2000. Since 2009, as a hobby, Krasny has operated a woodworking shop in Northbrook, Illinois called Custom Woodworking Design, making plaques and awards.

== Personal life ==
Krasny is married, with one child. He lives with his family in Highland Park, Illinois.
