= John Warren Kindt =

John W. Kindt is an American business theorist who is a professor of business at the University of Illinois Urbana-Champaign. Since 1990, Kindt has probably been best known as one of the most well-published academics in issues relating to gambling. He has served as a senior editor, contributing author, and intermittent co-author of the United States International Gambling Report and United States International Gaming Report (also known as U.S. Int’l Gambling Report). Kindt's academic research and publications contributed to the enactment of the 1996 U.S. National Gambling Impact Study Commission, the U.S. Unlawful Internet Gambling Enforcement Act of 2006, and various other Federal and state statutes.

== Education and early careers ==
After receiving a B.A. in Business from the College of William and Mary in 1972, Kindt earned four graduate degrees in Law and Business; specifically, J.D. 1976, MBA 1977, from the University of Georgia; LL.M. 1978, SJD 1981, from the University of Virginia. During the 1970s, Kindt was employed in several state and Federal government positions. He also served as a Senior Fellow at the London School of Economics.

== Research contributions ==
Kindt's research has resulted in over 70 academic articles in the areas of legalized gambling's economic impacts, antitrust law, tax law, commercial law, environmental law, and public and private international law. He had also released multi-volume book, Marine Pollution and the Law of the Sea.
