= Engelbert Seibertz =

Engelbert Seibertz may refer to:

- Engelbert Seibertz (painter) (1813–1905), German portraitist and history painter
- Engelbert Seibertz (architect) (1856–1929), historicist German architect
