= Jeffrey Brown (professor) =

American economist (born 1968)

- Born: February 16, 1968 (age 58)

Academic background
- Education: Miami University (BA); Harvard University (MPP); Massachusetts Institute of Technology (PhD)
- Doctoral advisor: James M. Poterba

Academic work
- Institutions: University of Illinois at Urbana–Champaign; Harvard University

Jeffrey Robert Brown (born February 16, 1968) served as the dean of the Gies College of Business of the University of Illinois at Urbana-Champaign from 2015 until 2024. Previously he was the William G. Karnes Professor in the Department of Finance and the Director of the Center for Business and Public Policy. He serves as a research associate at the National Bureau of Economic Research and as associate director of the NBER Retirement Research Center. Since 2009 he has served as a Trustee for TIAA, the operating company of TIAA-CREF. From October 2006 through September 2008, he served as a member of the Social Security Advisory Board. He served as a Senior Economist with the President's Council of Economic Advisers from 2001 to 2002. He earned a Ph.D. in economics from MIT (where his advisor was Jim Poterba), a Masters in Public Policy from Harvard Kennedy School, and a B.A. from Miami University.

== Selected publications ==
- Brown, J., Dimmock, S., Kang, J., Weisbenner, S. Forthcoming. How University Endowments Respond to Financial Market Shocks: Evidence and Implications. American Economic Review
- Brown, J., Weisbenner, S. Forthcoming. The Distributional Effects of the Social Security Windfall Elimination Provision. Journal of Pension Economics and Finance
- Brown, J., Kapteyn, A., Mitchell, O. Forthcoming. Framing and Claiming: How Information-Framing Affects Expected Social Security Claiming Behavior.. Journal of Risk and Insurance
- Brown, J., Goda, G., McGarry, K. 2012. Long-Term Care Insurance Demand Limited by Beliefs about Needs, Concerns about Insurers, and Care Available from Family.. Health Affairs, 31: 1294–1302
- Brown, J., Nijman, T. 2012. Options to Improve the Decumulation of Pension Wealth in the Netherlands. In The Future of Multi-Pillar Pensions. Netspar
