= BizTech =

American quarterly magazine

- Editor In Chief: Ryan Petersen
- Editorial Director: Ricky Ribeiro
- Managing Editor: Bob Keaveney
- Senior Editor: Brad Sowell
- Senior Web Editor: Keara Dowd
- Categories: Online magazine
- Frequency: Quarterly
- First issue: March 19, 2005; 20 years ago
- Company: CDW
- Country: USA
- Language: English

BizTech is an American based online quarterly magazine that focuses on advanced technology inside U.S. businesses and nonprofit organizations.

== Content ==
BizTech explores the nexus of business and technology, with a focus on technologies that U.S. businesses commonly deploy to drive growth and efficiency. The magazine frequently covers topics such as data center deployments, cybersecurity, advanced collaboration and digital workspace technologies, cloud technologies, networking technologies and other topics surrounding the digital transformation of businesses.

== Publishing ==
BizTech is published by CDW, a multibrand technology provider headquartered in Vernon Hills, IL. The inaugural issue was released in March 2005. The magazine is published quarterly with a circulation of approximately 85,000 in the United States.
