= Alex Fink =

United States general

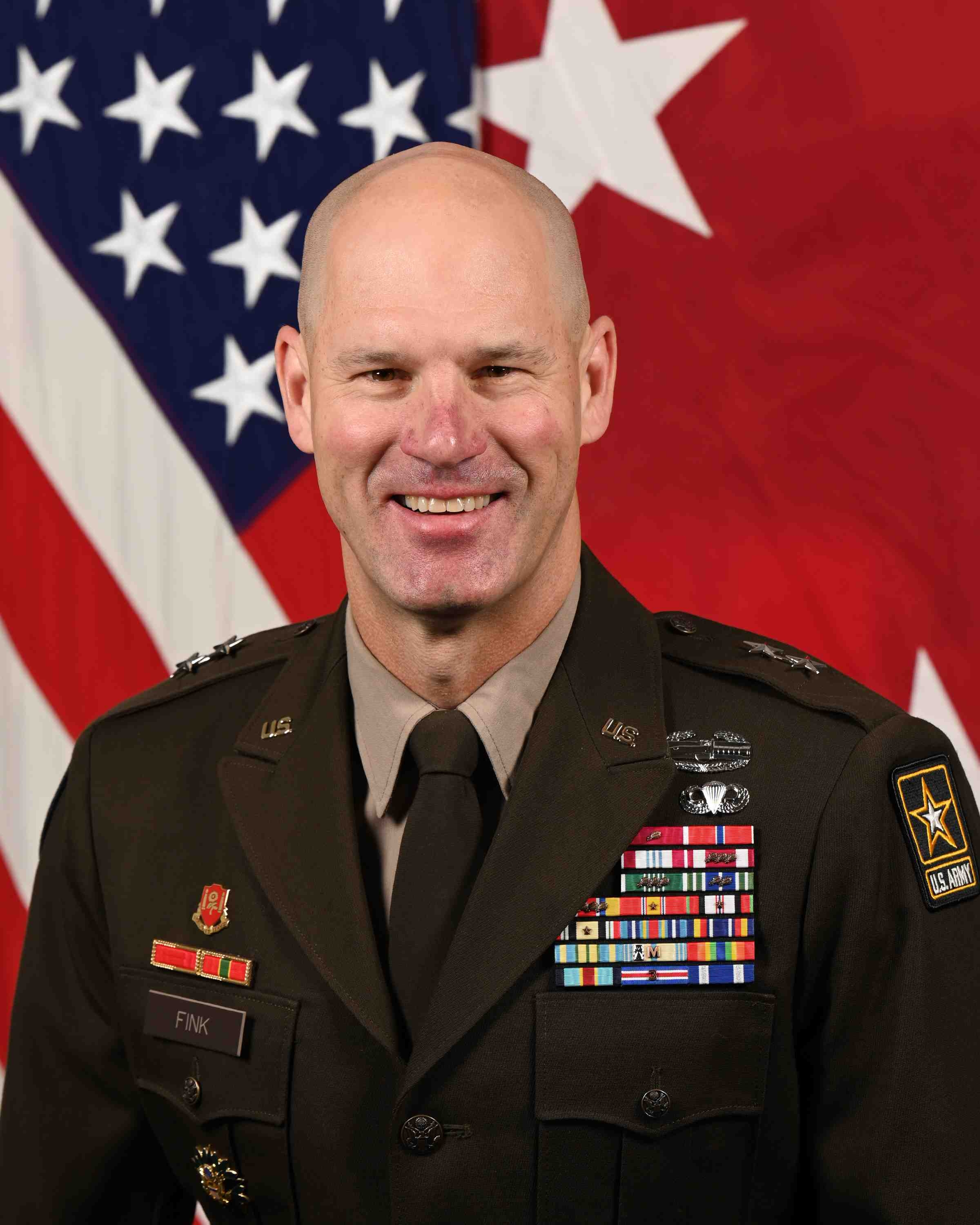
- Official portrait, 2022
- Spouse: Janet
- Children: 3
- Military career
- Allegiance: United States
- Branch: United States Army
- Service years: 1990–2023
- Rank: Major General
- Commands: 4th Sustainment Command (Expeditionary); 649th Regional Support Group; Logistics Civil Augmentation Program Support Brigade; 2nd Battalion, 383rd Regiment
- Conflicts: Iraq War; War in Afghanistan
- Awards: Legion of Merit; Bronze Star Medal

Alex B. Fink is a retired United States Army major general who last served as chief, United States Army Enterprise Marketing team, where he was responsible for overseeing and advancing the Army's marketing and recruitment efforts, utilizing innovative strategies to engage new recruits.

== Early life and education ==
Fink was raised in Oregon, Missouri. He attended the University of Missouri and participated in its ROTC program. He was commissioned as a second lieutenant in 1990.

Fink later earned a Master of Business Administration from the University of Illinois and a Master of Strategic Studies from the United States Army War College.

== Military career ==
In 1994, Fink transitioned to the Illinois Army National Guard, where he served as a battalion fire support officer and operations officer for the 2nd Battalion, 122nd Field Artillery in Chicago, Illinois.

From 2014 to 2016, Fink served as the commander for the 649th Regional Support Group in Cedar Rapids, Iowa. He was then appointed as commander of the United States Army Reserve 4th Sustainment Command (Expeditionary) until August 2019.

In 2019, Fink joined active duty officers to explore using big data to improve Army marketing and recruitment initiatives.

== Civilian career ==
As a civilian, Fink worked as a senior business strategy consultant and project manager for The Context Network.

== Personal life ==
Fink is married to Janet, and has three children.
