= Engilbert II of Saint Gall =

Benedictine monk and scribe (died 934)

Engilbert II (died 13 August 934) was a Benedictine monk and scribe of the abbey of Saint Gall. He served as abbot between 925 and 933.

Engilbert cannot be unequivocally identified before his abbacy because several monks with the same name appear in the profession book of Saint Gall and in the Verbrüderungsbüchern (confraternity book) of Pfäfers and Reichenau. Four surviving charters from between the years 890 and 896 are thought to have been drafted by the future abbot. Between 895 and 914 two monks are mentioned with the name Engilbert. The future abbot was probably the younger of these. Consequently, Engilbert would have been subdeacon in 895. He is also described as the abbey's porter in a document from 2 July 898.

Engilbert is first attested as abbot on 21 September 925. King Henry I of Germany recognized his election and, on 4 November 926, confirmed his abbey's immunity from taxation and the local court, its right to freely elect its own abbot and its right of inquisition over its dependencies. In 933, he retired for reasons of health.

During Engilbert's abbacy in May 926, a major Hungarian raid passed through Swabia. His preemptive measures helped mitigate the damage to the monastery and its inhabitants. He ordered the construction of two castles for the protection of the inhabitants. The elderly and the children were sent for safety to Wasserburg across Lake Constance, while the library was removed to Reichenau Island and the monks took refuge in a fortress on the river Sitter. The legend of Saint Wiborada takes place before and during this Hungarian invasion.
