= Richard Engelbrecht-Wiggans =

American economist

Richard Engelbrecht-Wiggans is an American economist, focusing in operations research, quantitative analysis of decisions and mathematical programming for management science and operations research, decision sciences, currently the IBE Distinguished Professor Emeritus at University of Illinois.

He graduated from Harvard College and Cornell University.

== Bibliography ==
- Richard Engelbrecht-Wiggans (1977). On the fair and efficient allocation of indivisible commodities. Cornell University. OCLC 703744839.
- Richard Engelbrecht-Wiggans; Flavio M. Menezes (1993). Sequential auctions with continuation costs. Australian National University, Faculty of Economics and Depts. of Economics, Research School of Pacific Studies, Research School of Social Sciences. ISBN 978-0-86831-255-2.
