= Study Commission on the Women's Diaconate =

2016 commission by Pope Francis

Pope Francis created two Study Commissions on the Women's Diaconate, the first in August 2016 to review the theology of women deacons and their nature in the first centuries of the Catholic Church, and a second in April 2020 following discussion of the possibility of the women's diaconate at the Synod on the Amazon in October 2019. Their membership was equally divided between men and women. The report of the first commission was not published.

Discussing the ordination of women in October 2023, Cardinal Robert Prevost, the future Pope Leo XIV, excluded the possibility of women priests but observed that the possibility of women deacons has been the subject of two Vatican commissions. He said this demonstrates "openness to giving consideration" to that question.

== Background ==
The vocation of deacon was gradually transformed in the first centuries of Christian history from an office exercised permanently by men and, more rarely, women into a temporary office reserved to those who were candidates for ordination as priests and therefore reserved to men. Deacons were then ordained as "transitional deacons" with the understanding that they would eventually receive priestly ordination. Participants in the Second Vatican Council recommended the restoration of the ancient permanent diaconate with votes taken in October 1963 and September 1964. The Council's Dogmatic Constitution on the Church (Lumen gentium) said that with papal approval territorial groups of bishops could "restore" the diaconate "as a proper and permanent rank of the hierarchy". The role could be "conferred upon men of more mature age" even if married and upon young men bound by "the law of celibacy".

Pope Paul VI adhered to the Council's understanding when he authorized the establishment of a ministry of permanent deacons in 1967, restricted to men and allowing for married men. Relating these permanent deacons to the pre-existing status of transitional deacons, he provided for both permanent and transitional deacons to belong to a single order in the hierarchy of Church offices and both were to be ordained according to the same rite.

A 2002 report by the International Theological Commission, an advisory body to the Congregation for the Doctrine of the Faith, examined the question of women deacons. The result of a five-year effort, it was called "From the Diakonia of Christ to the Diakonia of the Apostles". Cardinal Joseph Ratzinger, later Pope Benedict XVI, chaired the all-male ITC committee that produced the report. Its conclusions did not absolutely exclude the possibility of women deacons but took a more nuanced stance. The ITC’s general secretary, Father Georges Cottier, later a cardinal, said the study's consideration of women deacons did “tend to support the exclusion of this possibility".

On 26 October 2009, Pope Benedict XVI modified canon law to clarify the distinction between deacons and priests, writing that only priests act "in the person of Christ", that the diaconate and priesthood are specific ministries rather than stages within the sacrament of order.

Archbishop Paul-André Durocher of Gatineau, Canada, raised the idea of ordaining women as deacons when speaking to the Synod on the Family in 2015, and continued to raise the issue following the synod. A few senior prelates took opposing positions on the possibility of a female diaconate, including Cardinals Walter Kasper and Gerhard Müller. Some bishops support the ordination of women as deacons.

In a May 2016 audience with women religious at the triennial assembly of the International Union of Superiors General (UISG), Pope Francis was asked about whether women could be included in the permanent diaconate, and was asked about the possibility of establishing an official commission to study the matter. Francis responded that the history was "obscure" and that it was not clear what role deaconesses played or whether they were ordained, and added: "It seems useful to me to have a commission that would clarify this well." Vatican spokesman Federico Lombardi subsequently said that Francis "did not say he intends to introduce a diaconal ordination for women and even less did he speak of the priestly ordination of women."

== First Commission ==
=== Creation and members ===
When Pope Francis created the Study Commission on the Women's Diaconate on 2 August 2016, he tasked it with examining the history of women serving as deaconesses in the Roman Catholic Church. He named Archbishop Luis Francisco Ladaria, Secretary of the Congregation for the Doctrine of the Faith and a year later its prefect, as its President and twelve members, six women and six men:

- Núria Calduch Benages, member of the Pontifical Biblical Commission
- Francesca Cocchini, faculty member at La Sapienza University (Rome) and the Patristic Institute Augustinianum
- Piero Coda, president of Sophia University Institute (Rome), member of the International Theological Commission
- Robert Dodaro OSA, president of the Patristic Institute Augustinianum
- Santiago Madrigal SJ, ecclesiologist at the Pontifical University Comillas (Madrid)
- Mary Melone SFA, president of the Pontifical University Antonianum (Rome)
- Karl-Heinz Menke, emeritus professor of dogmatic theology at the University of Bonn, member of the International Theological Commission
- Aimable Musoni SDB, ecclesiologist at Salesian Pontifical University (Rome)
- Bernard Pottier SJ, faculty member at Institute D'etudes Théologiques (Brussels), member of the International Theological Commission
- Marianne Schlosser, theologian at the University of Vienna, member of the International Theological Commission;
- Michelina Tenace, theologian at the Pontifical Gregorian University (Rome)
- Phyllis Zagano, senior research associate-in-residence at Hofstra University (New York)

The commission's members appeared divided in their views. Zagano has written a book titled Holy Saturday: An Argument for the Restoration of the Female Diaconate in the Catholic Church, while Menke has argued that women cannot be deacons because they cannot be priests.

In August 2016, the UISG thanked Pope Francis for following through on his commitment and for the number of women members.

=== Work ===
The Commission held its first meeting in November 2016 in Rome.

The Study Commission produced an initial report to Pope Francis by January 2019. On 7 May 2019, Francis said the Study Commission had not produced a "definitive response", stymied by a lack of consensus on the role of deaconesses in early Christianity, specifically whether the ordination of women deacons in the early Church was "sacramental". He said: "They worked together. And they found agreement up to a certain point. But each one of them has their own vision, which doesn't accord with that of the others. They stopped there as a commission, and each one is studying and going ahead." He did not indicate whether the Study Commission remains active as a body. He said the Commission's work could serve as the basis for continuing research and added: "I am not afraid of studies."

== Second Commission ==
=== Creation and members ===
The Amazonian synod called for a continued study of the female diaconate. Pope Francis promised first to re-open the previous commission but then announced the creation of a new commission on 8 April 2020 composed of five men (two permanent deacons and three priests) and five lay women. Those appointed were:

- Cardinal Giuseppe Petrocchi, president, archbishop of L'Aquila
- Denis Dupont-Fauville, secretary, an official of the Congregation for the Doctrine of the faith
- James Keating, a deacon, author of works on holy orders and the diaconate
- Dominic Cerrato, permanent deacon and director of diaconal formation in the Diocese of Joliet, Illinois
- Santiago del Cura Elena, a Spanish theologian and professor
- Angelo Lameri, an Italian theologian and professor at the Pontifical Lateran University
- Barbara Hallensleben, professor of dogmatic theology at the University of Freiburg, Switzerland
- Manfred Hauke, a German priest teaching theology in Lugano, Switzerland
- Catherine Brown Tkacz, professor at the Ukrainian Catholic University in Lviv
- Caroline Farey, a catechist for the Diocese of Shrewsbury, United Kingdom
- Anne-Marie Pelletier, a French biblical scholar
- Rosalba Manes, a bible scholar teaching in Viterbo, Italy

=== Work ===
A letter from the second commission president was sent to pope Leo XIV on 18 September 2025 and released publicly on 4 December of the same year. The letter summarizes secret votes taken by different members of the second commission during three distinct meetings, the last of which, in 2025, was convened to review responses to the call for the ordainatin of women as deacons by the Synod on Synodality. The letter reported mixed votes on the question of the ordination of women deacons "as a degree of the sacrament of Holy Orders,." and affirmed that a definitive judgment could not be formulated at that time.

== See also ==
- Deaconess
- Ordination of women and the Catholic Church#Ordination to the diaconate
- Women in the Catholic Church
