= Luis Ladaria Ferrer =

Roman Catholic cardinal (born 1944)

His Eminence Luis Francisco Ladaria Ferrer SJ
- Prefect Emeritus of the Dicastery for the Doctrine of the Faith
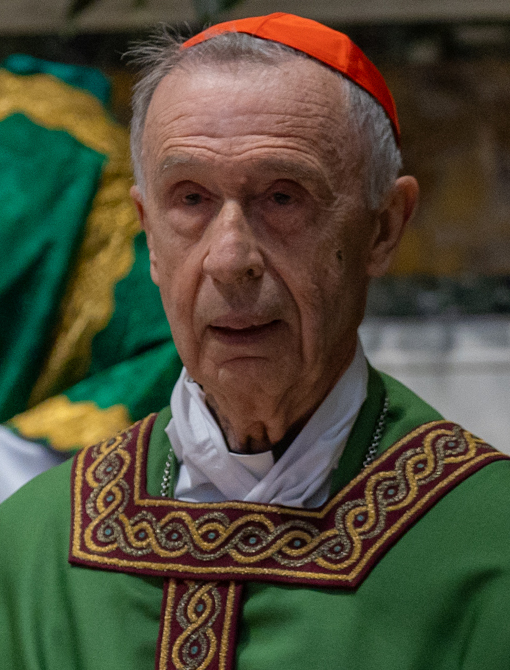
- Ladaria Ferrer, 4 February 2024
- Church: Catholic Church
- Appointed: 1 July 2017
- Term ended: 1 July 2023
- Predecessor: Gerhard Ludwig Müller
- Successor: Víctor Manuel Fernández
- Other post: Cardinal-Deacon of Sant'Ignazio Loyola in Campo Marzio (2018–)
- Previous posts: Secretary-General of the International Theological Commission (2004–2008); Secretary of the Congregation for the Doctrine of the Faith (2008–2017); Titular Archbishop of Thibica (2008–2018); President of the Pontifical Commission "Ecclesia Dei" (2017–2019); President of the International Theological Commission (2017–2023); President of the Pontifical Biblical Commission (2017–2023

Orders
- Ordination: 29 July 1973 by Teodoro Ubeda Gramage
- Consecration: 26 July 2008 by Tarcisio Bertone
- Created cardinal: 28 June 2018 by Pope Francis
- Rank: Cardinal-Deacon

Personal details
- Born: Luis Francisco Ladaria Ferrer; 19 April 1944 (age 82) Manacor, Spain
- Education: University of Madrid; Comillas Pontifical University; Sankt Georgen Graduate School of Philosophy and Theology; Pontifical Gregorian University
- Motto: In sanctitate et iustitia
- Coat of arms: Luis Francisco Ladaria Ferrer's coat of arms

Styles of Luis Francisco Ladaria Ferrer
- Reference style: His Eminence
- Spoken style: Your Eminence
- Religious style: Cardinal
- Informal style: Cardinal

Luis Francisco Ladaria Ferrer SJ (born 19 April 1944) is a Spanish Jesuit, theologian and a cardinal of the Catholic Church. After a thirty-year career teaching theology, he joined the Roman Curia in 2004 as Secretary-General of the International Theological Commission. He was made an archbishop when named secretary of the Dicastery for the Doctrine of the Faith (CDF) in 2008 and served as its prefect from 2017 to 2023. He was raised to the rank of cardinal in 2018.

== Birth and education ==
Ladaria Ferrer was born in Manacor, on the island of Mallorca, Spain. He studied at the University of Madrid, graduating with a degree in law in 1966. He entered the Society of Jesus on 17 October 1966. After attending the Comillas Pontifical University in Madrid and the Sankt Georgen Graduate School of Philosophy and Theology in Frankfurt am Main, Germany, Ladaria was ordained to the priesthood on 29 July 1973.

In 1975 he obtained a doctorate in theology from the Pontifical Gregorian University, with a thesis entitled, The Holy Spirit in St Hilary of Poitiers.

== Priestly ministry ==
Ladaria Ferrer became professor of dogmatic theology and the history of dogma at the Comillas Pontifical University. In 1984, he assumed the same position at the Pontifical Gregorian University in Rome, where he was vice-rector from 1986 to 1994. He became a member of the International Theological Commission in 1992 and a consultor of the Congregation for the Doctrine of the Faith in 1995.

In March 2004, Ladaria Ferrer was named Secretary-General of the International Theological Commission. He led the Commission's evaluation, beginning in 2006, of the concept of limbo and the prospects for salvation of infants who die unbaptized. The Commission concluded, in his words, that "there are more appropriate ways to address the issue of the fate of children who die without having received baptism, for whom a hope of salvation cannot be ruled out."

== Episcopal ministry and work in the Curia ==
On 9 July 2008, Pope Benedict XVI appointed Ladaria Ferrer the Secretary of the Congregation for the Doctrine of the Faith and made him an archbishop with the titular see of Thibica. His episcopal consecration took place on 26 July 2008. The principal consecrator was Cardinal Tarcisio Bertone, his predecessor as Secretary of the CDF. The co-consecrators were Cardinal William Joseph Levada and Bishop Vincenzo Paglia, one of the founders of the Community of Sant'Egidio. His appointment was criticized by some who considered his writings like Theology of original sin and grace and Theological Anthropology unorthodox. He told an interviewer: "I don't like extremisms, either progressive, or traditionalist ones. I believe that there is a via media, which is taken by the majority of professors of Theology in Rome and in the Church in general, which I think is the correct path to take.... Everyone is free to criticize and make the judgments they want. If you ask me if I'm concerned I have to say that these opinions don't concern me too much. Besides, if I was appointed to this office, I must presume that my works do not deserve these judgments."

He continued to be general secretary of the International Theological Commission until 22 April 2009, when he resigned and was succeeded by Charles Morerod, O.P. On 13 November 2008, he was appointed a consultor of the Congregation for Bishops and on 31 January 2009, a consultor of the Pontifical Council for Promoting Christian Unity. He was named a member of the Holy See's team charged with the dialogue with the Society of St. Pius X that began on 26 October 2009.

On 2 August 2016, he was named President of the Study Commission on the Women’s Diaconate, formed by Pope Francis to consider the possibility of allowing women to serve as deacons.

He also has a predilection for the early Church fathers, patrology, and Christology. When asked in August 2008 to describe the issues facing the CDF he said: "I can't go into details. Our Congregation always moves with discretion and speaks exclusively through its acts."

== Prefect ==
On 1 July 2017, Pope Francis appointed Ladaria prefect of CDF succeeding Cardinal Gerhard Ludwig Muller. Ladaria also succeeded to the offices held ex officio by the prefect: president of the Pontifical Commission Ecclesia Dei (suppressed January 2019), president of the Pontifical Biblical Commission, and president of the International Theological Commission.

On 28 June 2018, Pope Francis made Ladaria a cardinal, assigning him the deaconry of Sant'Ignazio di Loyola a Campo Marzio.

In an essay printed in L'Osservatore Romano on 29 May 2018, Ladaria wrote that those who raise the possibility of female priests "create serious confusion among the faithful".

Ladaria was named as a co-defendant in a private prosecution in France of Cardinal Philippe Barbarin for failing to report a sexual abuser. In October 2018, the Vatican invoked diplomatic immunity on his behalf, since he was a minister of the Vatican City State, and the trial proceeded without him. Barbarin was found guilty in March 2019 and acquitted in late January 2020.

On 14 February 2019, Pope Francis named Ladaria a member of the Pontifical Council for Promoting Christian Unity. Pope Francis named him a member of the Congregation for the Oriental Churches on 6 August 2019. He was named a member of the Pontifical Council for Culture on 11 November 2019.

On 1 July 2023, Pope Francis named Archbishop Víctor Manuel Fernández to succeed Ladaria as prefect.

== Views and theology ==
=== Death penalty ===
Cardinal Ladaria in 2018, announcing changes to the Catechism regarding capital punishment, said that it was consistent with Pope John Paul II's 1995 papal encyclical Evangelium Vitae and that the change "affirms that ending the life of a criminal as punishment for a crime is inadmissible because it attacks the dignity of the person, a dignity that is not lost even after having committed the most serious crimes".

The cardinal also said that the changes were a "decisive commitment to favor a mentality that recognizes the dignity of every human life" while calling for "respectful dialogue with civil authorities" to formulate conditions to eliminate capital punishment wherever it is still in effect.

=== Female diaconate and ordination ===
Ladaria, just before his elevation to the cardinalate in 2018, said that while female deacons did exist in the early Church, they were not the same as their male counterparts, i.e. an equivocation of terms. He said that the commission he headed on the subject had to determine the meaning of the title 'deaconess'. Ladaria had repeatedly said prior to this that the commission was not tasked with making an actual determination, but rather to present their findings to Pope Francis.

The month before, Ladaria wrote an article for L'Osservatore Romano in which he argued that the ruling against women being ordained to the priesthood was both infallible and definitive.

=== Euthanasia ===
In a letter addressed to Brother René Stockman in 2017, Ladaria affirmed the Church's "adherence to the principles of the sacredness of human life and the unacceptability of euthanasia". Ladaria addressed the letter in response to the practice of euthanasia in psychiatric hospitals of the Congregation of the Brothers of Charity's Belgian branch. Ladaria said that "euthanasia remains an inadmissible act, even in extreme cases" and affirmed that "Catholic teaching affirms the sacred value of human life" irrespective of age or circumstances such as disability or illness.

He further criticized "the moral unacceptability of euthanasia" and "the impossibility of introducing this practice into Catholic schools" since it was akin to collaborating with a secular agenda from a secular authority, not a religious authority.

=== Marriage ===
In 2021 the CDF stated the Catholic Church did not have the power to bless same-sex unions. It stated that it is "impossible" for God to "bless sin" but the CDF did note the existence of some "positive elements" in the non-sexual aspects of same-sex relationships. Pope Francis approved the response by the CDF, saying it was "not intended to be a form of unjust discrimination, but rather a reminder of the truth of the liturgical rite".

== Selected writings ==
- El espíritu en Clemente Alejandrino: estudio teológico-antropológico (The Spirit in Clement of Alexandria: a theological-anthropological study), ISBN 9788485281244, 1980
- Introduccion a la antropologica teologica (Introduction to Anthropological Theology), ISBN 9788471519306, 1993
- El Dios Vivo y Verdadero: El Misterio de La Trinidad (The Living and True God: The Mystery of the Trinity), ISBN 9788488643407, 1998
- Jesucristo, salvación de todos (Jesus Christ, the salvation of all), ISBN 9788428531306, 2007
- Teología del pecado original y de la gracia (Theology of Original Sin and Grace), ISBN 9788479145828, 2007
- Jesús y el Espíritu: la unción (Jesus and the Spirit: the anointing), ISBN 9788483535509, 2013
- La unción de la Gloria: en el Espíritu, por Cristo, al Padre (The anointing of Glory: in the Spirit, through Christ, to the Father), ISBN 9788422017233, 2014

Editor

- Diccionario de San Hilario de Poitiers, 2006
- Hilario de Poitiers, Comentario al Evangelio de San Mateo (Commentary on the Gospel of Saint Matthew), ISBN 9788422014874, 2010

== See also ==
- Cardinals created by Francis

Catholic Church titles
Preceded by Georges Cottier	General Secretary of the International Theological Commission; 8 March 2004 – 22 April 2009	Succeeded by Charles Morerod
Preceded by Ramón Alfredo Dus	— TITULAR — Titular Archbishop of Thibica; 9 July 2008 – 28 June 2018	Succeeded by Philippe André Yves Marsset
Preceded by Angelo Amato	Secretary of the Congregation for the Doctrine of the Faith; 9 July 2008 – 1 July 2017	Succeeded by Giacomo Morandi
Preceded by Gerhard Ludwig Müller	President of the Pontifical Commission "Ecclesia Dei"; 1 July 2017 – 17 January 2019	Office abolished
Preceded by Gerhard Ludwig Müller	Prefect of the Congregation for the Doctrine of the Faith; 1 July 2017 – 1 July 2023	Succeeded by Víctor Manuel Fernández
Preceded by Gerhard Ludwig Müller	President of the Pontifical Biblical Commission; 1 July 2017 – 1 July 2023	Succeeded by Víctor Manuel Fernández
Preceded by Gerhard Ludwig Müller	President of the International Theological Commission; 1 July 2017 – 1 July 2023	Succeeded by Víctor Manuel Fernández
Preceded by Roberto Tucci	Cardinal-Deacon of Sant'Ignazio Loyola in Campo Marzio; 28 June 2018 –	Incumbent
