= Riccardo Petricca =

Italian telecommunications engineer and author

- Riccardo Petricca
- Born: 1976 (age 49–50); Sora, Lazio, Italy
- Education: University of Cassino and Southern Lazio
- Occupations: Engineer; Author; Lecturer

Riccardo Petricca (born 1976) is an Italian telecommunications engineer and author. His publications include Pastorale Digitale 2.0 (2015) and Chiesa e pastorale digitale. In uscita verso una società 5.0 (2023), co-written with Fortunato Ammendolia.

== Career ==
Petricca was born in Sora, Lazio in 1976 and studied telecommunications engineering at the University of Cassino and Southern Lazio. He became involved in digital communication activities within the Diocese of Sora-Cassino-Aquino-Pontecorvo during the 2010s. By 2016, the project had around 70 participants and was supported by Bishop Gerardo Antonazzo. Petricca wrote about the project in his 2015 book Pastorale Digitale 2.0. In February 2016, the book was presented in Sora and Cassino. During the Cassino event, the diocese signed a cooperation agreement with the Pontifical University Antonianum.

In a 2016 review for La Civiltà Cattolica, Giuseppe Romano noted that Pastorale Digitale 2.0 focused more on Petricca's religious experiences than on digital communication. Luciano Moia reviewed Chiesa e pastorale digitale in the Urbaniana University Journal in 2024, discussing its coverage of artificial intelligence and digital technology in Catholic pastoral work.

Petricca taught information and communication technology at the Pontifical Leonian College in Anagni. He later taught digital communication at the Pontifical Urban University in Rome, where he also lectured on artificial intelligence, robotics and ethics.

In March 2023, Petricca gave a presentation on artificial intelligence for the International Union of Superiors General. In 2024, he and Ammendolia participated in a discussion on artificial intelligence and ethics in Sora.

In June 2026, Sky TG24 identified Petricca as a lecturer at the Pontifical University Antonianum during a report on the environmental impact of artificial intelligence. He has also written articles for the Italian technology publications Agenda Digitale and AI4Business.

== Bibliography ==
- Petricca, Riccardo (2015). Pastorale Digitale 2.0. Edizioni Albatros. ISBN 9788856775990.
- Petricca, Riccardo (2022). Pastorale Digitale 3.0. Edizioni Albatros. ISBN 9788830659612.
- Ammendolia, Fortunato; Petricca, Riccardo (2023). Chiesa e pastorale digitale. In uscita verso una società 5.0. Il Pozzo di Giacobbe. ISBN 9788861249455.
- Petricca, Riccardo (2025). Pastorale Digitale 4.0. Dottrina sociale e intelligenza artificiale. Edizioni Albatros. ISBN 9791223608364.
