= Charles Morerod =

Swiss Dominican prelate

His Excellency, The Most Reverend Charles Morerod OP
- Bishop of Lausanne, Geneva and Fribourg
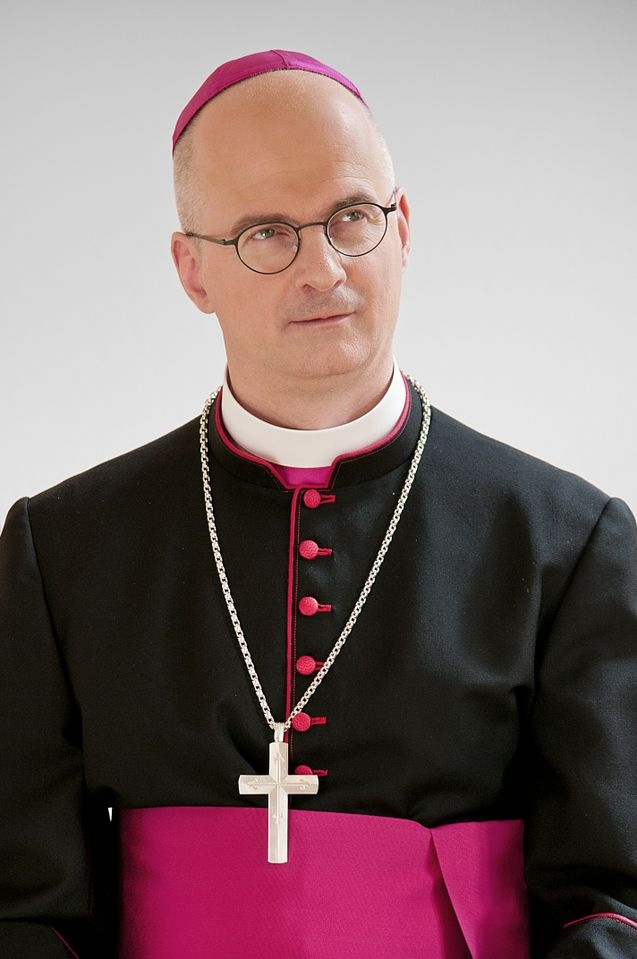
- Church: Roman Catholic
- Diocese: Diocese of Lausanne, Geneva and Fribourg
- Appointed: 3 November 2011
- Installed: 11 December 2011
- Predecessor: Bernard Genoud

Orders
- Ordination: 30 April 1988
- Consecration: 11 December 2011 by Cardinal Georges Cottier

Personal details
- Born: 28 October 1961 (age 64) Riaz, Switzerland
- Motto: Mihi vivere Christus est (latin) Pour moi, vivre, c’est le Christ (French)
- Coat of arms

Styles of Charles Morerod OP
- Reference style: The Most Reverend
- Spoken style: Your Excellency
- Religious style: Bishop
- Posthumous style: not applicable

Charles Morerod, OP (born 28 October 1961), is a Swiss Dominican prelate who has served as Bishop of Lausanne, Geneva and Fribourg since 2011. Previously, he served as rector of the Pontifical University of St. Thomas Aquinas in Rome, as a professor of dogmatic theology and as secretary general of the International Theological Commission.

== Early life and education ==
Morerod was born on 28 October 1961 in Riaz, Switzerland. He entered the Dominican novitiate in 1983, and was ordained a priest in 1988.

Morerod earned a licentiate in theology from the University of Fribourg in 1987, and a doctorate in theology from the same university in 1994. He was chaplain to the university from 1991 to 1994. In 1996, he obtained a licentiate in philosophy, also from the University of Fribourg, and a doctorate in philosophy from the Catholic University of Toulouse in 2004.

== Ordained ministry ==
From 1987 to 1989 Morerod was engaged in pastoral ministry, first as a deacon and then as vice-parish priest at the parish of St. Paul in Geneva. From 1989 to 1992 he was Assistant at the Faculty of Theology, University of Fribourg from 1991 to 1994 and chaplain of the University of Fribourg. In 1993 he received his doctorate in theology and a licentiate in philosophy in 1996. From 1994 to 1999 he was adjunct professor of Fundamental Theology at the University of Fribourg and since 1996 professor at the Pontifical University of St. Thomas Aquinas. Since 1997 he is editor of the edition in the French journal Nova et Vetera. In 1999 he became full-time professor at the Pontifical University of St. Thomas Aquinas. From 1999 to 2002 he also taught at the Faculty of Theology of Lugano. He was Vice-Dean of the Faculty of Theology from 2003 to 2009 and Dean of the Faculty of Philosophy at the Pontifical University of St. Thomas Aquinas. In 2004 he obtained his doctorate in philosophy at the Catholic Institute of Toulouse. From 2008 to 2011, he was also academic director of the Rome program for Catholic Studies students at the University of St. Thomas in St. Paul, MN.

In April 2009 he was appointed Secretary General of the International Theological Commission and Consultant of the Congregation for the Doctrine of the Faith. Morerod was appointed rector of the Angelicum in September 2009. He has been secretary general of the International Theological Commission since 22 April 2009, and consultor of the Congregation for the Doctrine of the Faith. A disciple of Charles Cardinal Journet, he has written several theological articles in the review Nova et Vetera, reflecting on the doctrinal and philosophical aspects of ecumenism. He is also an ordinary member of the Pontifical Academy of St. Thomas Aquinas.

Since 26 October 2009, Morerod has been a member of the team responsible for the dialogue with the Society of St. Pius X.

=== Episcopal ministry ===
On 3 November 2011 Pope Benedict XVI named Morerod Bishop of Lausanne, Geneva and Fribourg. He was consecrated on 11 December at the Cathedral of St. Nicholas in Fribourg. Georges Cardinal Cottier, a fellow Dominican, was the principal consecrator.

On 12 June 2012 Bishop Morerod was appointed a member of the Congregation for Catholic Education.

He was appointed a member of the Congregation for Divine Worship and the Discipline of the Sacraments.

Morerod is the Grand Prior of the Switzerland and Liechtenstein Lieutenancy of the Equestrian Order of the Holy Sepulchre of Jerusalem.

On July 15, 2020, a Catholic Church inquiry found the Morerod was did not protect a former priest in his Diocese who was facing sex abuse allegations, but that Morerod said he had been told about the reported abuse, but the cases had been “downplayed". However, it was also acknowledged that the number of reported cases of abuse involving Catholic priests and monks have been increasing over the past few years and that the payment of financial compensation which Morerod and his Diocese distributed for victims of abuse totaled CHF675,000 ($718,000) in 2018 - up from CHF425,000 in the previous year - according to figures released by the Vatican News.

Catholic Church titles
Preceded by Luis Ladaria Ferrer	General Secretary of the International Theological Commission; 22 April 2009 – 3 November 2011	Succeeded by Serge-Thomas Bonino
