= Pierre Mamie =

Swiss Catholic bishop (1920–2008)

- Bishop of Lausanne, Geneva and Fribourg
- Church: Catholic Church
- Diocese: Diocese of Lausanne, Geneva and Fribourg
- In office: 29 December 1970 – 9 November 1995
- Predecessor: François Charrière
- Successor: Amédée Grab
- Previous posts: Titular Bishop of Otriculum (1968-1970); Auxiliary Bishop of Lausanne, Geneva and Fribourg (1968-1970)

Orders
- Ordination: 7 July 1946
- Consecration: 6 October 1968 by Charles Journet

Personal details
- Born: 4 March 1920 La Chaux-de-Fonds, Canton of Neuchâtel, Switzerland
- Died: 14 March 2008 (aged 88) Villars-sur-Glâne, Canton of Fribourg, Switzerland

Pierre Mamie (4 March 1920 – 14 March 2008) was a Swiss prelate of the Catholic Church who served as the bishop of the Diocese of Lausanne, Geneva and Fribourg from 1970 to 1995, following two years as auxiliary bishop there. His earlier career was devoted to teaching at the Fribourg seminary and at the University of Fribourg.

== Biography ==
Pierre Mamie was born into a family of modest means on 4 March 1920 in La Chaux-de-Fonds, Neuchâtel, Switzerland. He was educated at the Collège Saint-Michel in Fribourg and the major seminary there. He was ordained a priest in 1946.

From 1962 to 1965, he taught the Old Testament at the seminary and at the University of Fribourg. Mamie was personal secretary to the theologian Cardinal Charles Journet during the last session of the Second Vatican Council from September to December 1965. He later called the Council "God's greatest gift to the world in the 20th century". Reminiscing in the 21st century, he said:

Finding myself in the midst of the Council Fathers was an extraordinary human and spiritual experience. I have seen what the collegiality of bishops around the world represents, in debates and outside the sessions. I was also able to feel the tensions that accompanied certain debates, in particular those provoked by Archbishop Marcel Lefebvre and his friends about religious freedom.

He was a professor in the theology faculty of the University of Fribourg when, on 15 July 1968, Pope Paul VI appointed him auxiliary bishop of Lausanne, Geneva and Fribourg and titular bishop of Otriculum. He received his episcopal consecration on 6 October from Journet.

On 29 December 1970, he was named bishop of that diocese. His appointment was not welcomed by all parties, as there were tensions and divisions about the liturgical innovations proceeding from the Council, the provocative presence of Lefebvre's seminary on one hand, and attacks by theologians at the University of Fribourg against Pope Paul's recent encyclical condemning artificial birth control on the other, notably from the theologian Stephan Pfürtner. A contemporary described Mamie as "wounded" and "shaken" by the turmoil provoked when he only sought, in his view, to guarantee orthodox instruction of his seminarians.

Mamie determined that the Society of St. Pius X (SSPX), established on an experimental basis by his predecessor Bishop François Charrière in 1970, should be suppressed. On 24 January 1975, he asked the prefect of the Sacred Congregation for Religious, Cardinal Arturo Tabera, to do so. Tabera responded in April expressing full agreement and telling Mamie to proceed himself, and Mamie suppressed the SSPX on 6 May 1975, effective immediately.

In 1976, Mamie warned Lefebvre that saying Mass though Catholic Church authorities had forbidden him from exercising his priestly functions would further exacerbate his relationship with Rome.

From 1973 to 2000 he was a member of the Pontifical Council for Promoting Christian Unity. He served two terms as head of the Conference of Swiss Bishops. He also developed friendships with a number of celebrities, including the artist Jean Tinguely and the mystery writer Frédéric Dard; he and Dard published a collection of their conversations. In one journalist's assessment, this made Mamie appear worldly to some.

He retired as bishop of Fribourg upon the appointment of his successor, Amédée Grab, on 9 November 1995. He devoted his life in retirement to editing the works of Cardinal Journet for publication, a project Pope Paul had urged upon him when Journet died and which included 1800 letters exchanged between Journet and Mamie over 25 years. He died on 14 March 2008 in Villars-sur-Glâne, Sarine, Fribourg.
