= Thomas Maria Mamachi =

Italian-Greek Dominican theologian and historian

Thomas Maria Mamachi O.P.
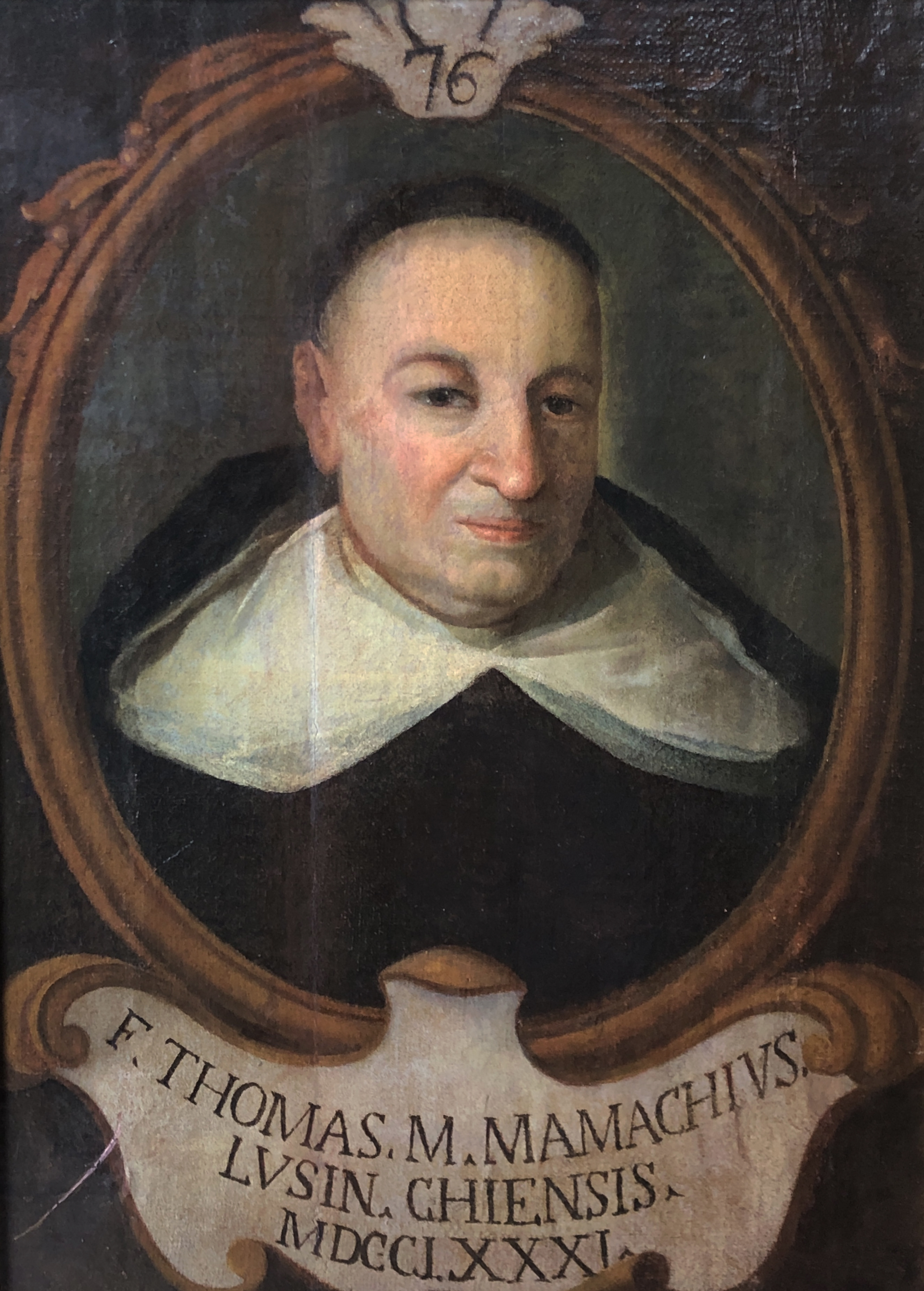
- Portrait of Thomas Maria Mamachi
- Born: Francesco Saverio Mamachi; December 3, 1713; Chios, Ottoman Empire
- Died: 5 June 1792 (aged 78); Tarquinia, Papal States (now Province of Viterbo, Lazio, Italy)
- Occupations: Dominican friar; Theologian; Historian

Academic work
- Notable works: Originum et antiquitatum christianorum libri XX (1749-55); Dei costumi dei primitivi cristiani (1753-54)

Thomas Maria Mamachi O.P. (December 4, 1713 in Chios – June 7, 1792 in Corneto, near Montefiascone), was an Italian-Greek Dominican theologian and historian.

== Life ==
At the age of sixteen, he entered the convent of Chios and passed later to St. Mark's at Florence and the Minerva at Rome.

In 1740, he was appointed professor of physics in the Roman Sapienza university, and in 1743, he taught philosophy at the Propaganda Fide. His residence at Florence and Rome brought him into contact with brilliant men of his order, e.g. Giuseppe Agostino Orsi, Divelli and Daniello Concina, and greatly facilitated his progress in his studies. He collaborated with Orsi in his "De Romani pontificis in synodos oecumenicas et earum canones potestate".

Soon, Pope Benedict XIV appointed him prefect of the Casanatensian Library, master of theology and consultor of the Congregation of the Index. Owing to his office he had to take part in the controversy between the Appellants (Jansenists) and the Jesuits, and displayed an impartiality which greatly increased the difficulties of his anxious and laborious position. He engaged in lively theological controversies with Gian Domenico Mansi and Cadonici.

He had likewise to intervene in the controversy concerning the beatification of Juan de Palafox y Mendoza. In a published writing on this question, he dealt severely with the Jesuit party who opposed the beatification; but he was not less energetic in dealing with their opponents, the Appellants and Jansenist Church of Utrecht.

He was director of the ecclesiastical journal of Rome (1742–85), and established at his residence a reunion of the learned Roman society.

Mamachi was a zealous supporter of the power of the Roman Pontiff. Involved in all the controversies of the day, he was one of the first to take issue with Johannes Nicolaus Von Hontheim (Febronius). Pius VI made him secretary of the Index (1779) and afterwards Master of the Sacred Palace, and frequently availed himself of his advice and of his pen.

== Writings ==
Mamachi's great work was to have been his "Christian Antiquities", but his labours in the field of dogma and jurisprudence absorbed so much of his time that he published only four of the twenty books that he planned. Moreover, he lived in an age when the good method inaugurated by Antonio Bosio had been abandoned and, considered as an archaeological work, the synthesis which he had projected is valueless. A second edition, however, appeared in 1842–1851.

His chief writings are:

- Mamachi, Tommaso Maria (1748). De ratione temporum Athanasiorum deque aliquot synodis IV saeculo celebratis (in Latin). Florence: Zempellianis.
- Mamachi, Tommaso Maria (1749). Originum et antiquitatum christianarum libri XX (in Latin). Vol. 1. Rome: In Typographio Palladis Excudebant Nicolaus Et Marcus Palearini.
- Mamachi, Tommaso Maria (1750). Originum et antiquitatum christianarum libri XX (in Latin). Vol. 2. Rome: In Typographio Palladis Excudebant Nicolaus Et Marcus Palearini.
- Mamachi, Tommaso Maria (1751). Originum et antiquitatum christianarum libri XX (in Latin). Vol. 3. Rome: In Typographio Palladis Excudebant Nicolaus Et Marcus Palearini.
- Mamachi, Tommaso Maria (1752). Originum et antiquitatum christianarum libri XX (in Latin). Vol. 4. Rome: In Typographio Palladis Excudebant Nicolaus Et Marcus Palearini.
- Mamachi, Thomas-Maria (1755). Originum et antiquitatum christianarum libri XX (in Latin). Vol. 5. Rome: In Typographio Palladis Excudebant Nicolaus Et Marcus Palearini.
- Dei costumi dei primitivi cristiani. Vol. 1. Rome: presso gli Eredi di Gio. Lorenzo Barbiellini. 1753.
- Dei costumi dei primitivi cristiani. Vol. 2. Rome: presso gli Eredi di Gio. Lorenzo Barbiellini. 1753.
- Dei costumi dei primitivi cristiani. Vol. 3. Rome: presso gli Eredi di Gio. Lorenzo Barbiellini. 1754.
- Mamachi, Tommaso Maria (1776). Epistolae ad Justinum Febronium de ratione regendae christianae reipublicae (in Latin). Vol. 1. Rome: ex typographia Salvioni.
- Mamachi, Tommaso Maria (1777). Epistolae ad Justinum Febronium de ratione regendae christianae reipublicae (in Latin). Vol. 2. Rome: ex typographia Salvioni.
