= Mary Melone =

Sister Mary Melone S.F.A.
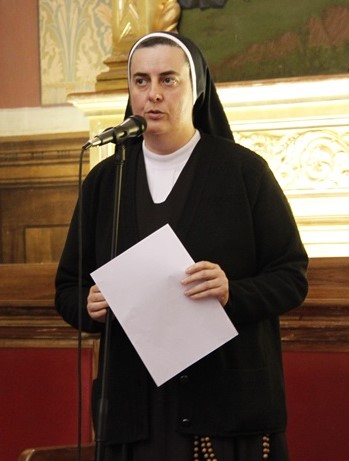
- Born: Maria Domenica Melone; 1964 (age 61–62); La Spezia, Italy
- Occupation: Academic
- Title: Rector of the Pontifical University Antonianum

Academic background
- Education: Degree in education and theology
- Alma mater: Libera Università Maria SS. Assunta; Pontifical University Antonianum
- Thesis: The Holy Spirit in Richard of St. Victor's 'De Trinitate (2002)

Academic work
- Discipline: Theology
- Sub-discipline: Medieval theology
- Institutions: Pontifical University Antonianum

Mary Melone, S.F.A. (born 1964) is an Italian Franciscan religious sister and theologian specialising in the life and thought of Saint Anthony of Padua. Since October 2014, she has served as the Rector of the Pontifical University Antonianum in Rome. She was the first woman to head a pontifical university.

== Life ==
Born Maria Domenica Melone, she joined the Franciscan Sisters of Blessed Angela of Foligno (Suore Francescane Angeline in Italian) after graduating from high school. She took her temporary vows in 1986, and professed her perpetual vows in 1991.

Melone has a number of degrees. She has a degree in teaching and philosophy from the Libera Università Maria SS. Assunta, graduating in 1992. She then studied theology at the Pontifical University Antonianum, graduating in 1996. She completed her Doctor of Philosophy (PhD) degree at the Pontifical University Antonianum in 2001; her doctoral thesis was titled The Holy Spirit in Richard of St. Victor's 'De Trinitate'.

From 2011 to 2014, Melone was dean of the Department of Theology at the Pontifical University Antonianum. In 2014, she was elected by the Congregation for Catholic Education as the Rector of the Pontifical University Antonianum. She will serve a three-year term. She is the first woman to head a pontifical university. She was installed as rector on 22 October 2014.

Melone has also served as President of the Italian Society for Theological Research.

Pope Francis named her a member of the Study Commission on the Women's Diaconate on 2 August 2016.
