= Theologian of the Pontifical Household =

Curial office of the Roman Catholic Church

In the Roman Catholic Church, Theologian of the Pontifical Household (Latin: Pontificalis Domus Doctor Theologus) is a Roman Curial office which has always been entrusted to a Friar Preacher of the Dominican Order and may be described as the pope's theologian. The title was formerly known as the Master of the Sacred Apostolic Palace (Latin: Magister Sacri Palatii Apostolici) before the changes implemented in Pope Paul VI's 1968 apostolic letter Pontificalis Domus.

== History ==
In 1218 St. Dominic was the first papal theologian to be given the title "Master of the Sacred Palace". Eighty-four Dominicans succeeded him until the early 20th century. Eighteen of them were later named Cardinals, twenty-four archbishops or bishops (including some of the cardinals), and six were elected Superiors general of the order. Several are famous for their works on theology, e.g. Durandus of Saint-Pourçain, Juan de Torquemada, Sylvester Mazzolini 'Prierias', Thomas Maria Mamachi and Giuseppe Agostino Orsi. The majority were Italians, but there were also 10 Spaniards, 10 Frenchmen, one German, and one from England (William de Boderisham, or Bonderish, 1263–1270?).

The chronicles of the churches of San Domenico at Perugia and San Domenico at Orvieto attest that the studium at the convent of Santa Sabina, which is the forerunner of the Pontifical University of Saint Thomas Aquinas, Angelicum, played the special role of frequently providing papal theologians from among its members.

The post is now held by Fr. Wojciech Giertych, a Polish Dominican, a former student of and professor of theology at the Angelicum, who was appointed by Pope Benedict XVI in 2005 to replace the Swiss Cardinal Georges Cottier.

It has sometimes been asserted that St. Thomas Aquinas was a Master of the Sacred Palace. This is due to a misconception: he was Lector of the Sacred Palace, but these offices were not identical. (See Bullarium O. P., III, 18.) Though he and two other contemporary Dominicans, his teacher St. Albert the Great and his fellow pupil Bl. Ambrose Sansedonico (about both of whom the same assertion has been made) held successively the office of Lecturer on Scripture or Lecturer on Theology in the papal palace school, not one of them was Master of the Sacred Palace. Their names do not occur in the official lists. While all Masters of the Sacred Palace were Dominicans, several members of other orders were Lectors of the Sacred Palace (e.g. Peckham O.S.F., who became Archbishop of Canterbury in 1279).

St. Dominic's work as Master of the Sacred Palace consisted partly at least in expounding the Epistles of St. Paul. These exegetical lectures were delivered to prelates and to the clerical attendants of cardinals who, as the saint observed, had been accustomed to gather in the antechamber and to spend the time in gossip while their masters were having audiences with the pope. According to Renazzi (I, 25), St. Dominic may be regarded as the founder of the papal palace school, since his Biblical lectures were the occasion of its being established. The liturgist Josephus Catalanus, who, however, is not guilty of the confusion alluded to above, says he was the first Lector of the Sacred Palace as well as the first Master of the Sacred Palace.

In the thirteenth century the chief duty of the Master of the Sacred Palace was to lecture on Scripture and to preside over the theological school in Vatican: "in scholae Romanae et Pontificiae regimine et in publica sacrae scripturae expositione" (Echard). The Lectores or Magistri scholarum S. Palatii taught under him. It became customary for the Master of the Sacred Palace, according to Cardinal de Luca, to preach before the pope and his court in Advent and Lent. This had probably been sometimes done by St. Dominic. Up to the sixteenth century the Master of the Sacred Palace preached, but after it this work was permanently entrusted to his companion (another Dominican). A further division of labour was made by Benedict XIV (Decree, "Inclyta Fratrum", 1743); since the companion preaches to the papal household, and a Capuchin preaches to the pope and to the cardinals.

But the work of the Master of the Sacred Palace as papal theologian continues to the present. As it has assumed its actual form by centuries of development, we may give a summary of the legislation respecting it and the various functions it comprises and also of the honours attaching to it. The "Acta" (or "Calenda") of the Palatine officials in 1409 (under Alexander V) show that on certain days, the Master of the Sacred Palace was bound to deliver lectures, and on other days he was expected, if called upon, either to propose or to answer questions at the theological conference which was held in the pope's presence. On 30 October 1439, Eugene IV decreed that the Master of the Sacred Palace should rank next to the dean of the Sacred Rota, that no one should preach before the pope whose sermon had not been previously approved of by him, and that in accordance with ancient usage no one could be made a doctor of theology in Rome but by him (Bullarium O. P., III, 81). Callistus III (13 November 1455) confirmed and amplified the second part of this decree, but at the same time exempted cardinals from its operation (ibid., p. 356). It has fallen into disuse.

In the Fifth Lateran Council (sess. x, 4 May 1513) Leo X ordained that no book should be printed either in Rome or in its district without leave from the cardinal vicar and the Master of the Sacred Palace (ibid., IV, 318). Paul V (11 June 1620) and Urban VIII added to the obligations imposed by this decree. So did Alexander VII in 1663 (Bullarium, passim). All these later enactments regard the inhabitants of the Roman Province or of the Papal States. They were renewed by Benedict XIV (1 September 1744). And the permission of the Master of the Sacred Palace must be got not only to print, but to publish, and before the second permission is granted, three printed copies must be deposited with him: for himself, for his companion and for the cardinal vicar.

The Roman Vicariate never examines work intended for publication. For centuries the imprimatur of the Master of the Sacred Palace who always examined them followed the Si videbitur Reverendissimo Magistro Sacri Palatii of the cardinal vicar; in virtue of custom but not of any ascertained law, since about the year 1825 the cardinal vicar gives an imprimatur, and it follows that of the Master of the Sacred Palace. The obligation once incumbent on cardinals of presenting their work to the Master of the Sacred Palace for his imprimatur has fallen into disuse, but through courtesy many cardinals do present their works.

In the Constitution "Officiorum ac Munerum" (25 January 1897), Leo XIII declared that all persons residing in Rome may get leave from the Master of the Sacred Palace to read forbidden books, and that if authors who live in Rome intend to get their works published elsewhere, the joint imprimatur of the cardinal vicar and the Master of the Sacred Palace renders it unnecessary to ask any other approbation. As is well known, if an author not resident in Rome desires to have his work published there, provided that an agreement with the author's Ordinary has been made and that the Master of the Sacred Palace judges favourably of the work, the imprimatur will be given. In this case the book is known by its having two title pages: the one bearing the name of the domiciliary, the other that of the Roman publisher.

Before the establishment of the Congregation of the Inquisition (in 1542) and Congregation of the Index (1587), the Master of the Sacred Palace condemned books and forbade reading them under censure. Instances of his so doing occur regularly till about the middle of the sixteenth century; one occurred as late as 1604, but by degrees this task has been appropriated to the above-mentioned congregations of which he is an ex officio member. The Master of the Sacred Palace was made by Pius V (29 July 1570; see "Bullarium", V, 245) canon theologian of St. Peter's Basilica, but this Bull was revoked by his successor Gregory XIII (11 March 1575).

From the time when Leo X recognized the Roman University "Sapienza" (5 November 1513, by the decree "Dum suavissimos") he transferred to it the old theological school of the papal palace. The Master of the Sacred Palace became the president of the new theological faculty. The other members were the pope's grand sacristan (an Augustinian), the commissary of the Holy Office (a Dominican), the procurators general of the five Mendicant Orders, i.e. Dominican, Franciscan (Conventual), Augustinian, Carmelite and Servite, and the professors who succeeded to the ancient Lectors of the Sacred Palace. Sixtus V is by some regarded as the founder of this college or faculty, but he may have only given its definite form. He is said to have confirmed the prerogative enjoyed by the Master of the Sacred Palace of conferring all degrees of philosophy and theology. Instances of papal diplomas implying this power of the Master of the Sacred Palace occur in the "Bullarium" passim (e.g. of Innocent IV on 6 June 1406). The presidential authority of the Master of the Sacred Palace over this, the greatest theological faculty in Rome, was confirmed by Leo XII in 1824.

Since the occupation of Rome in 1870 by Italy, the Sapienza has been laicized and turned into a state university, so that on the special occasions when the Master of the Sacred Palace held an examination, e.g. for the purpose of examining all that are to be appointed to episcopal sees in Italy, or again of conferring the title of S.T.D., he did so, with the assistance of the high dignitaries just mentioned, in his apartment in the Vatican. He is also examiner in the concursus for parishes in Rome which are held in the Roman Vicariate. Before Eugene IV issued the Bull referred to above, the Master of the Sacred Palace was in processions etc., the dignitary immediately under the Apostolic subdeacons, but when this pope raised the auditors of the Rota to the rank of Apostolic subdeacons, he gave the Master of the Sacred Palace the place immediately next to the dean who was in charge of the papal mitre. In 1655, Alexander VII put the other auditors of the Sacra Romana Rota above the Master of the Sacred Palace. This was done, according to Cardinal De Luca, solely because one white and black habit looked badly among several violet soutanes. One of the occasional duties of the Master of the Sacred Palace is performed in conjunction with the auditors of the Rota; namely to watch over the three apertures or "drums" through which the cardinals receive all communications during a conclave. In papal processions, the Master of the Sacred Palace walks next to the auditors, immediately behind the bearer of the papal tiara.

Though the office has gradually lost some of its traditional authority and rank, the Master of the Sacred Palace is a very high official. He is one of the three Palatine prelates (the others being the papal Maggiordomo and the Grand Almoner) to whom, as to bishops, the papal guards present arms. He is always addressed, even by cardinals, as "Most Reverend". In the Dominican Order he ranks next to the general, ex-general and vicar-general. He is ex officio consultor of the Holy Office, prelate-consultor of Rites, and perpetual assistant of the Index. He is consultor of the Biblical Commission and is frequently consulted by the pope. His official audience occurs once a fortnight. The official apartment of the Master of the Sacred Palace was in the Quirinal, which long contained a complete series of portraits in fresco of the Masters of the Sacred Palace, beginning with St. Dominic. These were effaced when the Italian kingdom occupied the Quirinal, but copies of them were put in the temporary apartment of the Master of the Sacred Palace in the Vatican.

== Theologians of the Pontifical Household ==
Masters of the Sacred Apostolic Palace

- Saint Dominic
- Mario Cordovani (–1951)
- Michael Browne (1951–1955)

Theologians of the Pontifical Household

- Mario Luigi Ciappi (1955–1989; 1955–1968 as Master of the Sacred Palace)
- Georges Cottier (1990–2005)
- Wojciech Giertych (2005–2026)
- Serge-Thomas Bonino (2026–present)

== See also ==
- Preacher of the Papal Household

== Sources ==
- Creytens, Raymond, “Le Studium Romanae Curiae et le maître du Sacré Palais," Archivum Fratrum Praedicatorum 12 (1942): 5–83.
- Catalano, Josephus (1751). De magistro sacri palatii apostolici libri duo quorum alter originem, praerogativas, ac munia, alter eorum seriem continet, qui eo munere ad hanc usque diem donati fuere ad reverendissimum patrem fr. Antoninum Bremond ... auctore Josepho Catalano . (in Latin). Roma: typis Antonii Fulgoni apud S. Eustachium.
- "The Most Reverend Michael Browne, O.P., Eighty-First Master General" (PDF). Dominicana. 40 (2): 115–116. June 1955. Archived (PDF) from the original on August 24, 2020.

=== Acknowledgment ===
- Herbermann, Charles, ed. (1913). "Master of the Sacred Palace" . Catholic Encyclopedia. New York: Robert Appleton Company.
