= Wojciech Giertych =

Polish Catholic priest and theologian (born 1951)

The Reverend Wojciech Giertych O.P.
- Theologian Emeritus of the Pontifical Household
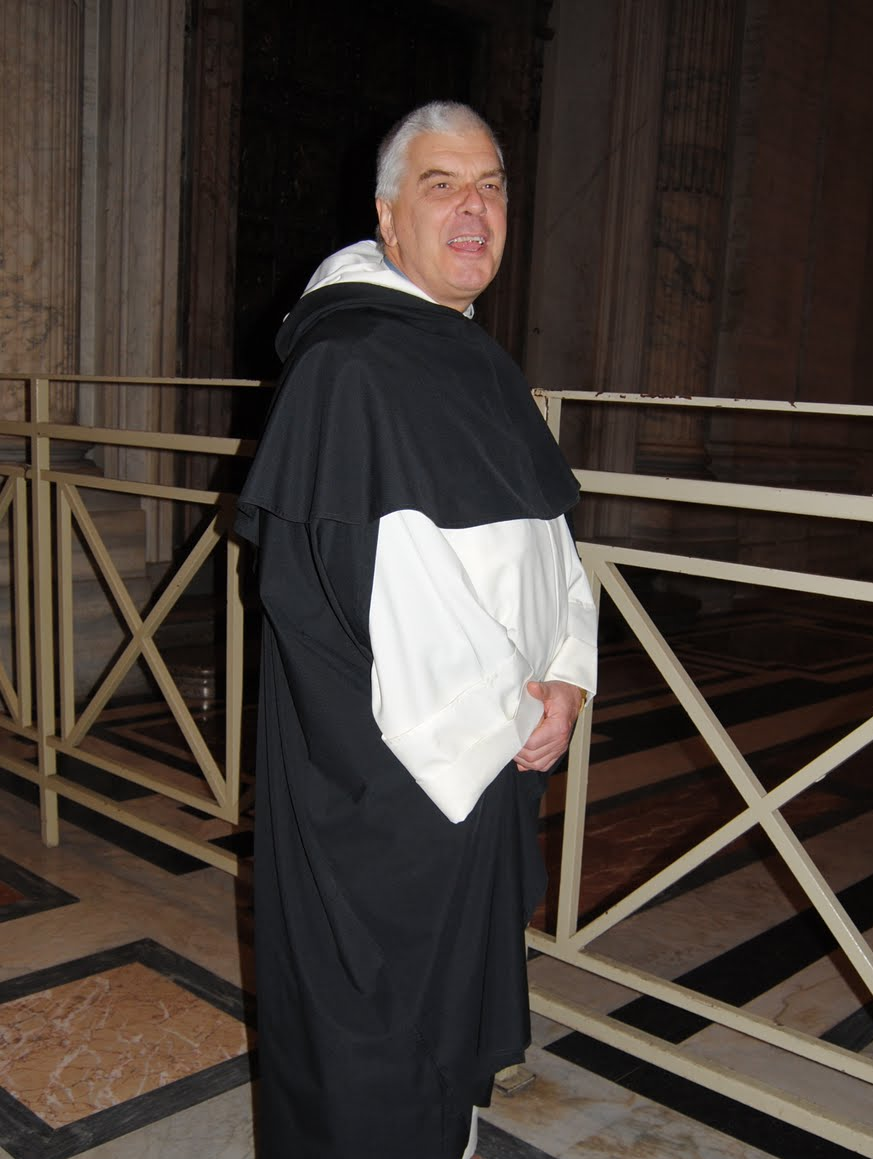
- Church: Roman Catholic
- Appointed: 1 December 2005
- Term ended: 21 November 2026
- Predecessor: Georges Cottier
- Successor: Serge-Thomas Bonino

Orders
- Ordination: 1981

Personal details
- Born: 27 October 1951 (age 75) Tottenham, London, England
- Parents: Jędrzej and Maria Giertych
- Education: St Ignatius' College; Adam Mickiewicz University; The Angelicum

Wojciech Giertych O.P. (pronounced [ˈvɔjt͡ɕɛɣ ˈɡʲɛrtɨx]; born 27 September 1951) is a Polish Roman Catholic priest in the Dominican Order. He has served in the Prefecture of the Pontifical Household as Theologian of the Pontifical Household since 2005 during the pontificates of Pope Benedict XVI, Pope Francis, and Pope Leo XIV.

== Biography ==
Giertych, one of nine children, was born in London, England in 1951 to writer Jędrzej Giertych and his wife Maria, six years after his family emigrated from Warsaw. His brother is Polish politician Maciej Giertych. Two of his sisters entered religious life.

Giertych began his studies at the Jesuits' St Ignatius' College in Stamford Hill, London. After completing his studies at St Ignatius' in 1970, he studied history at Adam Mickiewicz University in Poznań, Poland. After graduating from the university, he joined the Dominican novitiate in 1975. He was ordained to the priesthood in 1981 in Kraków. He is an alumnus of the Pontifical University of Saint Thomas Aquinas, Angelicum in Rome, Italy, from which he obtained a licentiate in spiritual theology in 1983 and a doctorate in 1989 with a dissertation titled The new law as a rule for acts. Giertych has been a professor of moral theology at the Angelicum since 1994. Since 1998, he has held various roles as a member of the General Council of the Dominicans.

He was appointed theologian of the Papal Household on 1 December 2005 by Pope Benedict XVI. This post, which since the Middle Ages has most often been held by Dominicans, is tasked with providing advice to the pope on theological issues, as well as checking papal texts for theological clarity. Giertych also serves on the Pontifical Committee for International Eucharistic Congresses and as a consultant to the Congregation for the Doctrine of the Faith, the International Theological Commission, and the Congregation for the Causes of Saints.

Giertych speaks Polish, English, French, Italian, Spanish, Russian and Latin.

Catholic Church titles
Preceded by Georges Cottier	Theologian of the Pontifical Household; 2005–present	Succeeded by incumbent
