= Charles Journet =

Swiss Catholic cardinal and theologian (1891–1975)

Servant of God Charles Journet
- Cardinal-Priest of Santa Maria in Campitelli
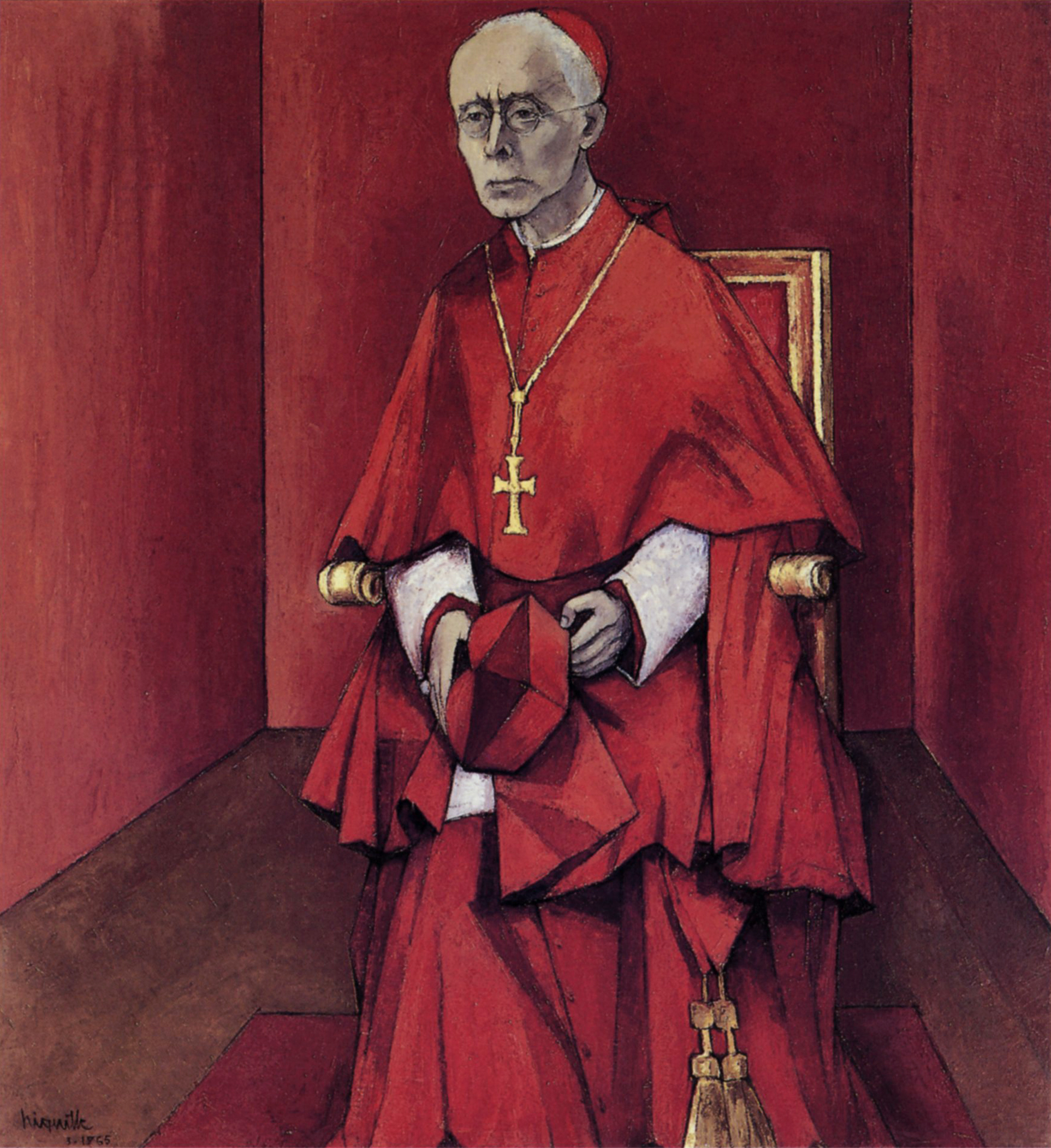
- 1965 ilustration of Journet
- Church: Roman Catholic Church
- In office: 5 March 1973 – 15 April 1975
- Predecessor: Carlo Chiarlo
- Successor: Corrado Bafile
- Previous posts: Titular Archbishop of Furnos minor (1965); Cardinal-Deacon of Santa Maria in Campitelli (1965–1973); Protodeacon of the College of Cardinals (1971–1973)

Orders
- Ordination: 15 July 1917
- Consecration: 20 February 1965 by François Charrière
- Created cardinal: 22 February 1965 by Pope Paul VI
- Rank: Cardinal-deacon (1965–1973); Cardinal-priest (1973–1975)

Personal details
- Born: Charles Journet; 26 January 1891 Geneva, Switzerland
- Died: 15 April 1975 (aged 84) Fribourg, Switzerland
- Motto: Dominus misereatur ("Lord have mercy")
- Coat of arms: Charles Journet's coat of arms

Styles of Charles Journet
- Reference style: His Eminence
- Spoken style: Your Eminence
- Informal style: Cardinal

Charles Journet (26 January 1891 – 15 April 1975) was a Swiss Roman Catholic cardinal and theologian.

Journet has been considered a figure of holiness and a candidate for canonisation; he has been accorded the title Servant of God.

== Life ==
Charles Journet was born in Geneva in 1891 as the son of Jean-Louis Journet and Jenny Bondat. He was baptized on the same day in the church of Sacré-Coeur and confirmed there on 12 June 1903 by Bishop Joseph Déruaz.

He studied at the seminary in Fribourg before being ordained to the priesthood on 15 July 1917. He then did pastoral work in the Diocese of Fribourg until 1924 and taught at the seminary there from 1924 to 1965. Together with Fr. François Charrière, he established the theological journal Nova et Vetera in 1926.

Journet was raised to the rank of domestic prelate of his holiness on 13 August 1946 by Pope Pius XII.

Pope Paul VI announced on 25 January 1965 that he planned to make Journet a cardinal. On 15 February 1965, Journet was appointed titular archbishop of Furnos Minor. He received his episcopal consecration on 20 February from Bishop François Charrière, with Bishops Franz von Streng and Louis-Sevérin Haller as co-consecrators.

In the consistory two days later, on 22 February, he was one of the three European theologians elevated to the College of Cardinals by Paul VI, who made him cardinal deacon of Santa Maria in Campitelli.

Although he only attended the last session of the Second Vatican Council in 1965, Journet was nevertheless a rather influential figure at the council. He supported the documents Dignitatis humanae and Nostra aetate while also affirming the Church's traditional teaching on divorce. The Pope himself requested two of the talks he gave during the last session: on the indissolubility of Christian Marriage and on religious freedom. Journet was a close friend of the renowned philosopher Jacques Maritain, with whom he founded the theological journal Nova et Vetera in 1926. Both of them had a central role in the creation of Montini's profession of faith.

In 1969, Montini, visiting Geneva, described Journet as "a teacher and a friend for many years".

A supporter of Socialist leader Miguel Arraes, the cardinal protested his imprisonment by the Brazilian military in the 1960s.

He was protodeacon from the following 10 August 1971 until he opted to become a cardinal priest on 5 March 1973. His best-known work is considered to be The Church of the Word Incarnate. In his letters to Maritain, Journet stated that, during the council, the Pope kept the two volumes of his (voluminous) French treatise entitled L'Église du Verbe incarné (The Church of the Incarnated Word) on his desk. Together with other writings, that treatise offered "the basic synthesis, the one from which Paul VI will be able to integrate all the other contributions."

He is also seen as the mentor of Swiss Cardinal Georges Cottier.

Journet died in Fribourg at the age of 84 on 15 April 1975. He is buried in the Chartreuse de la Valsainte in Gruyères.

== Beatification process ==
Journet's beatification cause has been approved. The Congregation for the Causes of Saints gave their approval and granted him the title of Servant of God.

Catholic Church titles
Preceded by None	Titular Archbishop of Furnos Minor; 15 February 1965 – 22 February 1965	Succeeded by Georges-Louis Mercier
Preceded by Carlo Chiarlo	Cardinal-Deacon of Santa Maria in Campitelli; 22 February 1965 – 5 March 1973	Succeeded by Himself as Cardinal-Priest
Preceded by Federico Callori di Vignale	Cardinal Protodeacon; 10 August 1971 – 5 March 1973	Succeeded by Pericle Felici
Preceded by Himself as Cardinal-Deacon	Cardinal-Priest pro hac vice of Santa Maria in Campitelli; 5 March 1973 – 15 April 1975	Succeeded by Corrado Bafile
