= William de Boderisham =

William de Boderisham (or Bonderish, c.1263–1270?) was an English Dominican theologian who served as Master of the Sacred Apostolic Palace in the 14th century. He was appointed by Pope Urban IV in 1263.
