= List of Catholic dioceses in Switzerland =

The Catholic Church in Switzerland, unlike most countries, does not consist of a distinct ecclesiastical province. Instead, all the dioceses are immediately subject to the Holy See. Currently, there are six Latin dioceses and two territorial Abbeys wholly in Switzerland. The only exception is the former diocese of Konstanz. In 1817, the Pope merged the diocese of Konstanz into the Archdiocese of Friburg in Germany, where it remains to this day.

== Current Exempt Dioceses ==
All dioceses of Switzerland are immediately subject to the Holy See.

=== Latin sees ===
- Diocese of Basel
- Diocese of Chur
- Diocese of Lausanne, Geneva and Fribourg
- Diocese of Lugano
- Diocese of Saint Gallen
- Diocese of Sion

=== Eastern Catholic jurisdiction ===
- Ukrainian Catholic Eparchy of Saint-Vladimir-le-Grand de Paris, with see in Paris, also competent in Switzerland and Benelux; Byzantine Rite in Ukrainian language

== Sources and external links ==
- GCatholic.org.
- Catholic-Hierarchy entry.
