= Superior general (Christianity) =

Leader of a religious institute in the Roman Catholic Church

A superior general or general superior is the head of an order or a religious congregation or, in other words, of a religious institute in the Catholic Church and in some other Christian denominations. The superior general usually holds supreme executive authority in the religious community, subject only to the Pope in the case of Catholic orders, while the general chapter has legislative authority. Many Catholic superiors general are elected (directly or indirectly) by their order's membership, and are based in Rome, and thus facilitate their order's engagement with other elements of church leadership (the Pope; the Roman Curia; other orders' leadership).

== History ==
The function of a superior general first emerged in the thirteenth century with the development of the centralized government of the Mendicant Orders. The Order of Friars Minor (Franciscans) organized their members under a Minister General, and the Order of Preachers (Dominicans) elected a Master of the Order.

Due to restrictions on women religious, especially the obligation of cloister for nuns, congregations of women were not initially able to organize with their own superior general. In 1609, Mary Ward was the superior general of a religious institute that imitated that of the Society of Jesus, but the institute was not accepted by the Roman Curia. It was not until the nineteenth century that religious congregations of women were able to organize with a general superior, and the role is now very common. Mother Teresa, for example, was the superior general of the Missionaries of Charity, known by the honorific title "Mother". Following the Second Vatican Council, women religious formed the International Union of superiors general.

== Canon law ==
In canon law, the generic term supreme moderator is used instead of superior general. Many orders and congregations use their own title for the person who holds this position. Some examples, in addition to those named above, are:

- Abbot general or Abbess general
- Custos-general
- Mother general
- Mother Superior
- Prior general
- Rector general
- General Director or general Directress

In many cases there is an intermediate level between the superior general and the superior of the individual monasteries or of equivalent local communities, often named the provincial superior.

== See also ==
- Commissary general
- Definitor-general
