= Bernard Genoud =

- Bishop of Lausanne, Geneva and Fribourg
- Church: Catholic Church
- Diocese: Diocese of Lausanne, Geneva and Fribourg
- In office: 18 March 1999 – 21 September 2010
- Predecessor: Amédée Grab
- Successor: Charles Morerod

Orders
- Ordination: 22 June 1968
- Consecration: 24 May 1999 by Amédée Grab

Personal details
- Born: 22 February 1942 Châtel-Saint-Denis, Canton of Fribourg, Switzerland
- Died: 21 September 2010 (aged 68) Fribourg, Canton of Fribourg, Switzerland

Bernard Genoud (22 February 1942 – 21 September 2010) was the bishop of the Roman Catholic Diocese of Lausanne, Geneva and Fribourg from his appointment on 18 March 1999, until his death on 21 September 2010. He was consecrated bishop on 24 May 1999.

Bernard Genoud was born on 22 February 1942 in Châtel-Saint-Denis, Switzerland. He was ordained a Catholic priest in 1968. Bishop Genoud died on 21 September 2010 from lung cancer at a hospice in Fribourg, Switzerland, at the age of 68. His funeral was held at the Fribourg Cathedral on 25 September 2010.

== Accusation of sexual abuse ==
In 2008, Bishop Genoud publicly asked Swiss Catholics for forgiveness during the priest sex abuse scandal in the country.

On December 11, 2023, Bishop Charles Morerod made a statement to the press accusing his predecessor, Bernard Genoud, of sexual abuse by a woman, then aged 19. The allegations date back to Bernard Genoud's days as a teacher at the Collège du Sud in Bulle, between 1976 and 1994.
