= Mario Luigi Ciappi =

Italian Catholic cardinal (1909–1996)

His Eminence Mario Luigi Ciappi O.P.
- Cardinal-Priest of Sacro Cuore di Gesù agonizzante a Vitinia
- Church: Roman Catholic Church
- Appointed: 22 June 1987
- Term ended: 23 April 1996
- Predecessor: Julio Rosales y Ras
- Successor: Telesphore Placidus Toppo
- Previous posts: Master of the Apostolic Palace (1955-68); Theologian of the Papal Household (1968-77); Titular Bishop of Miseno (1977); Cardinal-Deacon of Nostra Signora del Sacro Cuore (1977-87); Pro-Theologian of the Papal Household (1977-89); President of the Pontifical Academy of Saint Thomas Aquinas (1979-94)

Orders
- Ordination: 26 March 1932 by Francesco Marchetti Selvaggiani
- Consecration: 18 June 1977 by Dino Staffa
- Created cardinal: 27 June 1977 by Pope Paul VI
- Rank: Cardinal-Deacon (1977-87); Cardinal-Priest (1987-96)

Personal details
- Born: Mario Ciappi; 6 October 1909 Florence, Kingdom of Italy
- Died: 23 April 1996 (aged 86) Rome, Italy
- Buried: Campo Verano
- Parents: Luigi Ciappi; Teresa Anichini
- Education: Pontifical University of Saint Thomas Aquinas; Université catholique de Louvain; University of Fribourg
- Motto: Verbum spirans amorem
- Coat of arms

Styles of Mario Ciappi
- Reference style: His Eminence
- Spoken style: Your Eminence
- Informal style: Cardinal
- See: none

Mario Luigi Ciappi, O.P. (6 October 1909 – 23 April 1996) was an Italian cardinal of the Catholic Church who served as personal theologian to five popes from 1955 to 1989, and was elevated to the cardinalate in 1977.

== Early life ==
Born in Florence, Mario Ciappi studied at the seminary in Lucca. He later entered the Order of Friars Preachers, more commonly known as the Dominicans, and professed in the convent of Santa Maria della Quercia in Viterbo.

== Education ==
After studying at the convent of San Domenico in Pistoia, he attended the Pontifical University of Saint Thomas Aquinas, Angelicum in Rome, where he obtained his doctorate in theology in 1933 with a thesis entitled De divina misericordia ut prima causa operum Dei. Ciappi was ordained a priest by Cardinal Francesco Marchetti-Selvaggiani on 26 March 1932. He continued his studies at the University of Louvain and University of Fribourg until 1935.

== Theologian ==
As a professor, Ciappi taught moral and dogmatic theology at his alma mater, the Angelicum. From 1935 to 1955 he served as Dean of the Theological Faculty. He also lectured on Thomistic aesthetics at the Institute Beato Angelico.

On 5 May 1955 he was named Master of the Sacred Palace. In this capacity, Ciappi served as the personal theologian to the Pope. The title was later renamed as Theologian of the Pontifical Household on 28 March 1968 by Pope Paul VI's motu proprio Pontificalis Domus. He advised Pope Paul while the latter wrote Humanae Vitae, and later defended the same encyclical against charges that it was in conflict with Thomistic principles.

On 10 June 1977, in advance of his cardinalitial promotion, Ciappi was appointed Titular Bishop of Misenum. He received his episcopal consecration on the following 18 June from Cardinal Dino Staffa, with Archbishop Jean Jérôme Hamer, OP, and Bishop Angelo Verardo, OP, serving as co-consecrators, in the basilica of Santa Maria sopra Minerva. Paul VI, shortly afterwards, created Ciappi Cardinal Deacon of Nostra Signora del Sacro Cuore in the consistory of 27 June 1977.

From 1977 to 1989, the Dominican continued his role under the title of Pro-theologian of the Pontifical Household. Ciappi was one of the cardinal electors who participated in the conclaves of August and October 1978, which selected Popes John Paul I and John Paul II respectively. After ten years' standing as a Cardinal Deacon, he opted to become a Cardinal Priest, with the titular church of Sacro Cuore di Gesù agonizzante a Vitinia, on 22 June 1987.

== Death ==
Ciappi died in Rome, at age 86, and was there buried at the Campo Verano cemetery. During his thirty-four-year-long tenure as papal theologian, he served Popes Pius XII, John XXIII, Paul VI, John Paul I, and John Paul II.

== Bibliography ==
- Le cœur de Jésus : cœur du monde. Paris : FAC, 1982.
- Towards a Civilization of Love: a Symposium on the Scriptural and Theological Foundations of the Devotion to the Heart of Jesus. San Francisco: Ignatius Press, 1985.
- Vita religiosa e santità. Problemi e prospettive postconciliari. Milano: Ancora, 1970.

Catholic Church titles
Preceded by Michael Browne	Theologian of the Pontifical Household; 5 May 1955 – 6 October 1989	Succeeded by Georges Cottier
