= Núria Calduch =

Spanish biblical scholar and Roman Curia official

Núria Calduch i Benages

Personal life
- Born: March 26, 1957 (age 69) Barcelona, Spain
- Education: Autonomous University of Barcelona
- Known for: Doctor in Sacred Scripture from the Pontifical Biblical Institute; Professor at the Pontifical Gregorian University

Religious life
- Religion: Catholic

Senior posting
- Present post: Secretary of the Pontifical Biblical Commission
- Previous post: Member of the Study Commission on the Women's Diaconate

Núria Calduch i Benages (also Calduch-Benages, born 26 March 1957) is a Spanish biblical scholar and Roman Curia official. She is a professor at the Pontifical Gregorian University, and specialises in the wisdom books of the Old Testament. Calduch i Benages is the first woman to be Secretary of the Pontifical Biblical Commission.

== Education ==
Calduch i Benages graduated in Philosophy and Literature from the Autonomous University of Barcelona in 1979 and earned a doctorate in Sacred Scripture from the Pontifical Biblical Institute in Rome. She is a member in the congregation of Missionary Daughters of the Holy Family of Nazareth.

== Career ==
Calduch i Benages is a professor at the Pontifical Gregorian University since 2010 and a guest professor at the Pontifical Biblical Institute. She is considered an authority in the study of the wisdom books of the Old Testament.

Benedict XVI appointed Calduch i Benages as an expert of the Synod of Bishops on the Word of God celebrated in 2008, and Pope Francis appointed her as a member of the Study Commission on the Women's Diaconate in 2016. The committee had the role of investigating the role of women deacons in the early Church. The committee’s report was not published, and a second Commission was established in 2020, with a new membership.

On 9 March 2021, Pope Francis chose Calduch i Benages to be the Secretary of the Pontifical Biblical Commission, making her the first woman to reach this office. She was reappointed for a second term, ending in 2025. A festschrift was published in 2022 in her honour on the occasion of her 65th birthday, edited by Francis M. Macatangay and Francisco-Javier Ruiz-Ortiz.
