= Serge-Thomas Bonino =

French Catholic priest and theologian (born 1961)

The Reverend Father Serge-Thomas Bonino O.P.
- Theologian of the Pontifical Household
- Church: Roman Catholic
- Appointed: 21 November 2026
- Predecessor: Wojciech Giertych
- Other post: President of the Pontifical University of Saint Thomas Aquinas (2014–)
- Previous posts: Secretary of the International Theological Commission (2011–20)

Orders
- Ordination: 19 June 1988

Personal details
- Born: Serge-Thomas Bonino; 3 November 1961 (age 65) Marseille, France
- Education: École normale supérieure University of Fribourg; University of Poitiers

Serge-Thomas Bonino, OP (born 3 November 1961) is a French Catholic theologian and Dominican who was appointed Theologian of the Pontifical Household in 2026. He became the secretary of the International Theological Commission in 2011 and was appointed Professor of Philosophy at the Pontifical University of Saint Thomas Aquinas in Rome in 2014.

Catholic Church titles
Preceded by Charles Morerod	General Secretary of the International Theological Commission; December 2011 –	Incumbent
