= Convent of Saint-Hyacinth, Fribourg =

Convent in Fribourg, Switzerland

Coordinates: 46.797587°N 7.1560739°E

Convent of Saint-Hyacinth
- Couvent Saint-Hyacinthe; Kloster Saint-Hyacinthe
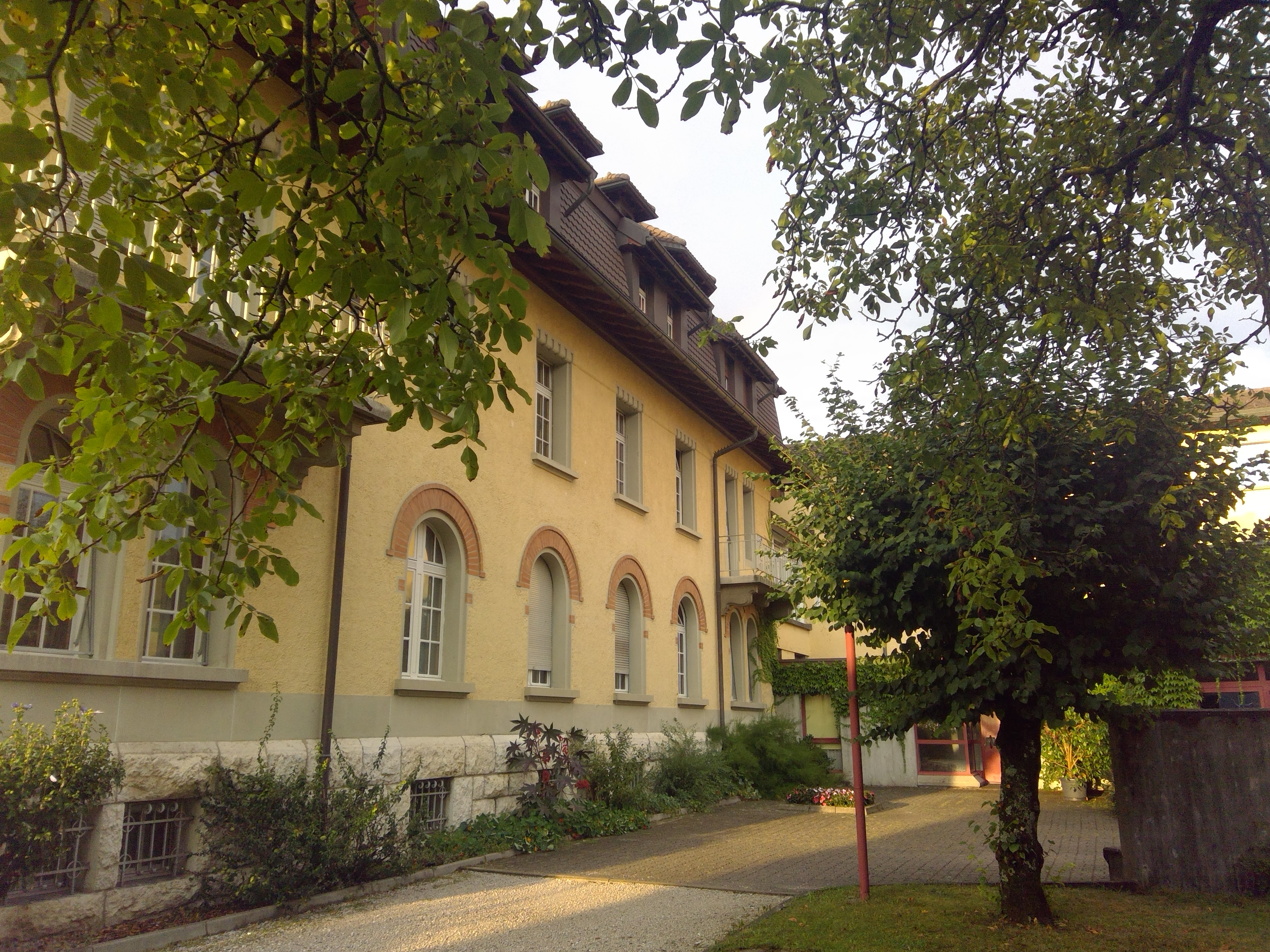
- Facade of the Convent

Religion
- Affiliation: Catholicism
- District: Sarine District
- Ownership: Swiss Dominican Province
- Patron: Hyacinth of Poland
- Status: active

Location
- Location: Fribourg
- State: Fribourg
- Country: Switzerland
- Interactive map of Convent of Saint-Hyacinth

Architecture
- Direction of façade: south

The Convent of Saint-Hyacinth is a convent of the Dominican Order in Fribourg, in the Roman Catholic Diocese of Lausanne, Geneva and Fribourg.

The Order bought the house in 1890, and used it as housing for professors teaching at the University of Fribourg.

In 1941, the house became a convent.

== See also ==
- Catholicism in Switzerland
