= François Charrière =

Bishop of Lausanne, Geneva and Fribourg from 1945 to 1970

- Bishop of Lausanne, Geneva and Fribourg
- Church: Catholic Church
- Diocese: Diocese of Lausanne, Geneva and Fribourg
- In office: 20 October 1945 – 29 December 1970
- Predecessor: Marius Besson
- Successor: Pierre Mamie

Orders
- Ordination: 15 July 1917
- Consecration: 21 November 1945 by Filippo Bernardini

Personal details
- Born: 1 September 1893 Cerniat, Canton of Fribourg, Switzerland
- Died: 11 July 1976 (aged 82)

François Charrière (1 September 1893 – 11 July 1976) was the Bishop of Lausanne, Geneva and Fribourg from 1945 to 1970.

== Biography ==
François Charrière was born into a peasant family in the village of Cerniat on 1 September 1893. He studied at the Collège Saint-Michel in Fribourg and then under the Capuchins at the Collège de Stans, earning his baccalaureate in 1913. He spent the next four years at the major seminary of the diocese and was ordained a priest on 15 July 1917. His first pastoral assignment was at the parish of Notre Dame in Lausanne for three years. He then renewed his studies at the Angelicum, earning his doctorate in canon law in 1923 with a thesis titled "De interdicto". After a brief term of pastoral work in Lausanne, in April 1924 he became professor of moral theology and sociology at the major seminary there. He taught canon law from 1929 to 1938, teaching for several of those years at the University of Fribourg as well. Alongside his teaching duties, he led the diocesan retreat office and led charities directed especially at young women. He also promoted missions in Asia and Eastern Europe. In 1941 he assumed direction the local Catholic journal La Liberté. In 1944 he established a French-language version of the Catholic news service Katholische Internationale Presse Aktion (KIPA).

He was teaching at the seminary when Pope Pius XII appointed him bishop of Lausanne, Geneva and Fribourg on 20 October 1945. He received his episcopal consecration on 21 November from Archbishop Filippo Bernardini, Apostolic Nuncio to Switzerland.

In 1969, near the end of his tenure in Fribourg, Charrière gave Archbishop Marcel Lefebvre permission to establish a seminary within his diocese in Écône. On 1 November 1970, Charrière issued a decree that established Lefebvre's Society of St. Pius X as a "pious union" for six years "by way of an experiment", to be extended for another six subject to the intervention of the bishop of Fribourg. The decree anticipated that after 12 years the Society "will be able to be definitively erected" by the diocesan bishop or the appropriate body within the Roman Curia. (Note: For a photocopy of Charrière's one-page decree, see Marchal, Denis (1988). Mgr Lefèbvre: vingt ans de combat pour le sacerdoce et la foi 1967-1987 (in French). Nouvelles Editions Latines. p. 69.)

His service in Fribourg ended when he was 77, with the appointment of his successor, Pierre Mamie, on 29 December 1970.

He died on 11 July 1976.

== See also ==
- St Benedict Patron of Europe Association
