= Giuseppe Agostino Orsi =

Italian cardinal, theologian, and ecclesiastical historian

His Eminence Giuseppe Agostino Orsi
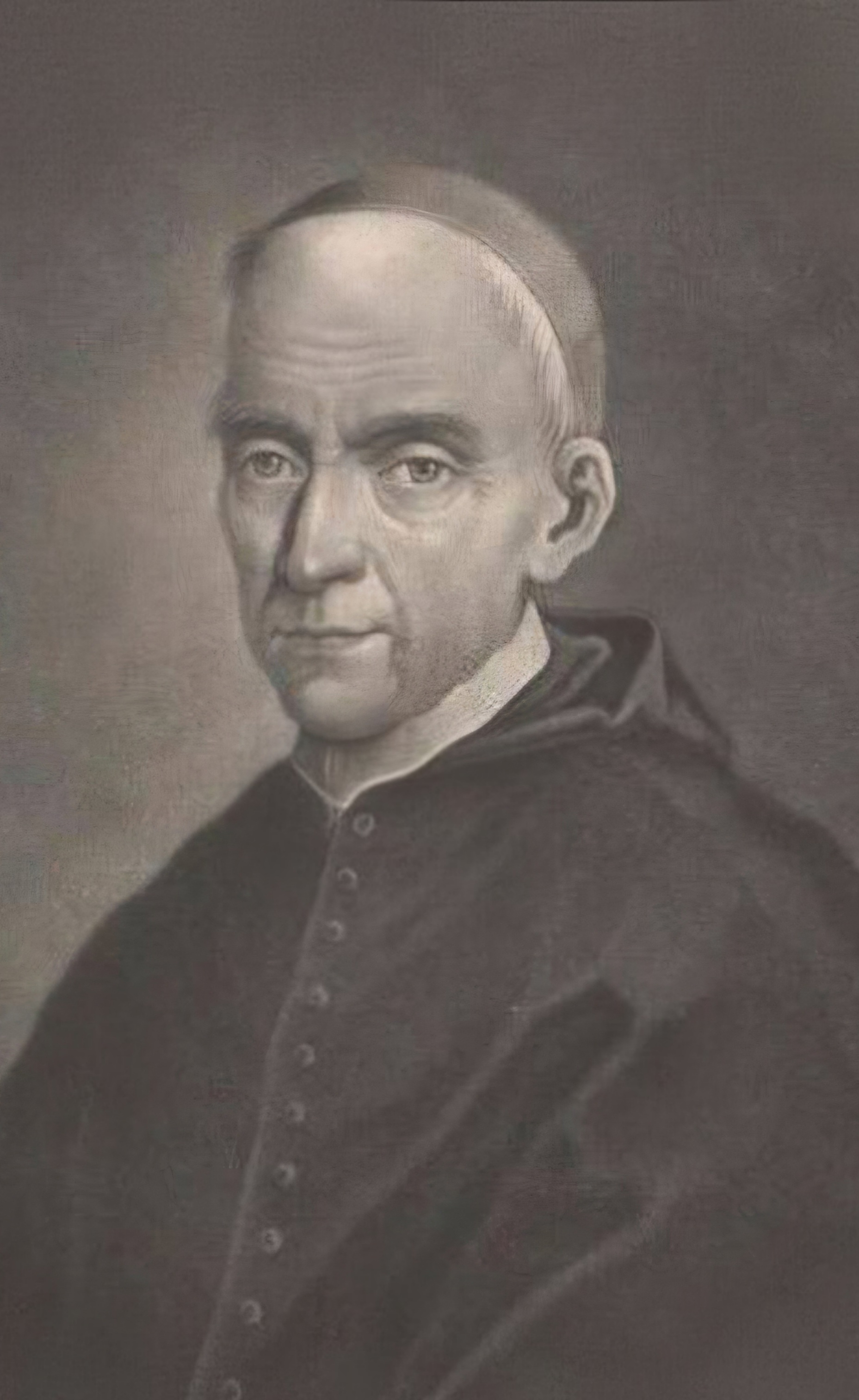
- Diocese: Diocese of Rome

Orders
- Created cardinal: 24 September 1759 by Pope Clement XIII
- Rank: Cardinal-Priest

Personal details
- Born: 9 May 1692 Florence, Grand Duchy of Tuscany
- Died: 12 June 1761 (aged 69) Rome, Papal States
- Denomination: Roman Catholic

Giuseppe Agostino Orsi (9 May 1692 – 13 June 1761) was a dominican cardinal, theologian, and ecclesiastical historian.

== Biography ==
Born as Agostino Francesco Orsi at Florence on 9 May 1692, of the aristocratic Florentine family Orsi, he studied grammar and rhetoric under the Jesuits, but entered the Dominican Order at Fiesole on 21 February 1708. At his profession, he received the monastic name of Giuseppe Agostino. His studies included not only theology, in which he gave particular attention to the Fathers of the Church and the great Scholastics, but also classical and Italian literature.

Having been master of studies for some time at the convent of San Marco, Florence, he was called to Rome in 1732, as professor of theology at the College of St. Thomas Aquinas, the future Pontifical University of Saint Thomas Aquinas, Angelicum, where he was also made prior. He held this position for two years, after which he became the theologian of Cardinal Neri Corsini, nephew of Pope Clement XII. In 1738 he was appointed secretary of the Congregation of the Index.

In 1749, Benedict XIV made him "Magister Sacri Palatii", or papal theologian, and on 24 September 1759, Clement XIII created him cardinal priest of the title of San Sisto. In this position, Orsi was an active member of several Congregations until his death on 12 June 1761, in Rome. He was buried in his titular church of San Sisto Vecchio.

== Works ==
Orsi's literary activity covered especially dogmatics, apologetics, and church history. His chief work was Storia ecclesiastica (20 vols., Rome, 1747–61), an ecclesiastical history. It only covered the period up until the end of the sixth century; the twenty-first volume, which Orsi had begun, was finished by his former pupil Giovanni Bottari (Rome, 1762). The work was afterwards brought up to the year 1587 by the Dominican Filippo Angelico Becchetti (new ed. in 42 vols., Venice, 1822; in 50 vols., Rome, 1838). It has been translated into several languages.

Other writings of Orsi are:

- Dissertatio historica qua ostenditur catholicam ecclesiam tribus prioribus sæculis capitalium criminum reis pacem et absolutionem neutiquam negasse (Milan, 1730)
- Dissertatio apologetica pro SS. Perpetuæ, Felicitatis et sociorum martyrum orthodoxia adversus Basnagium (Florence, 1728)
- Dell'origine del dominio e della sovranità temporale de' Romani Pontefici (Rome, 1742)
- Dissertazione dommatica e morale contra l'uso materiale della parola (Rome, 1727)
  - Dimostrazione teologica (Milan, 1729), in defence of the preceding work on truthfulness (the question of mental reservations)
- Dissertatio theologica de invocatione Spiritus Sancti in liturgiis Græcorum et Orientalium (Milan, 1731)
- Dissertationes duæ de baptismo in nomine Jesu Christi et de chrismate confirmationis (Milan, 1733)
  - Vindiciæ dissertationis de baptismo in nomine Jesu Christi (Florence, 1735), in defence of the preceding work
- De concordia gratiæ et liberi arbitrii (Rome, 1734)
- De irreformabili Romani Pontificis in definiendis fidei controversiis judicio (Rome, 1739), against Gallicanism
- De Romani Pontificis in Synodes œcumenicos eorumque canones potestate (Rome, 1740), against Gallicanism
