= Thibica =

Place in Tunisia

Thibica is a locality, archaeological site and railroad station in Zaghouan Governorate, Tunisia, located near Dar Cheïkh Ali east of El Fahs.

== History ==
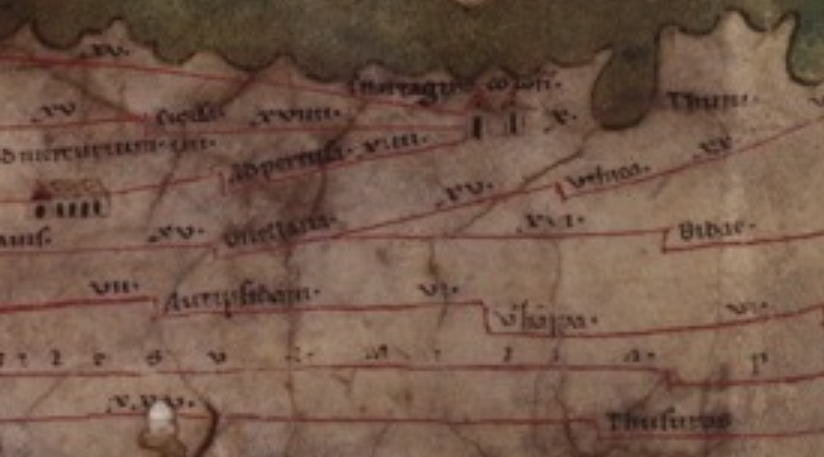
Extract of the Tabula Peutingeriana showing area around Thibica, during 4th century.

Thibica was a Roman Era civitas of the Roman province of Africa Proconsolare. An ancient Christian bishopric was centered in the town.
