= Diocese of Lausanne, Geneva and Fribourg =

Latin Catholic diocese in Switzerland

Coordinates: 46.8062°N 7.1627°E

Diocese of Lausanne, Geneva and Fribourg Dioecesis Lausannensis, Genevensis, et Friburgensis Diocèse de Lausanne, Genève et Fribourg Bistum Lausanne, Genf und Freiburg

Catholic
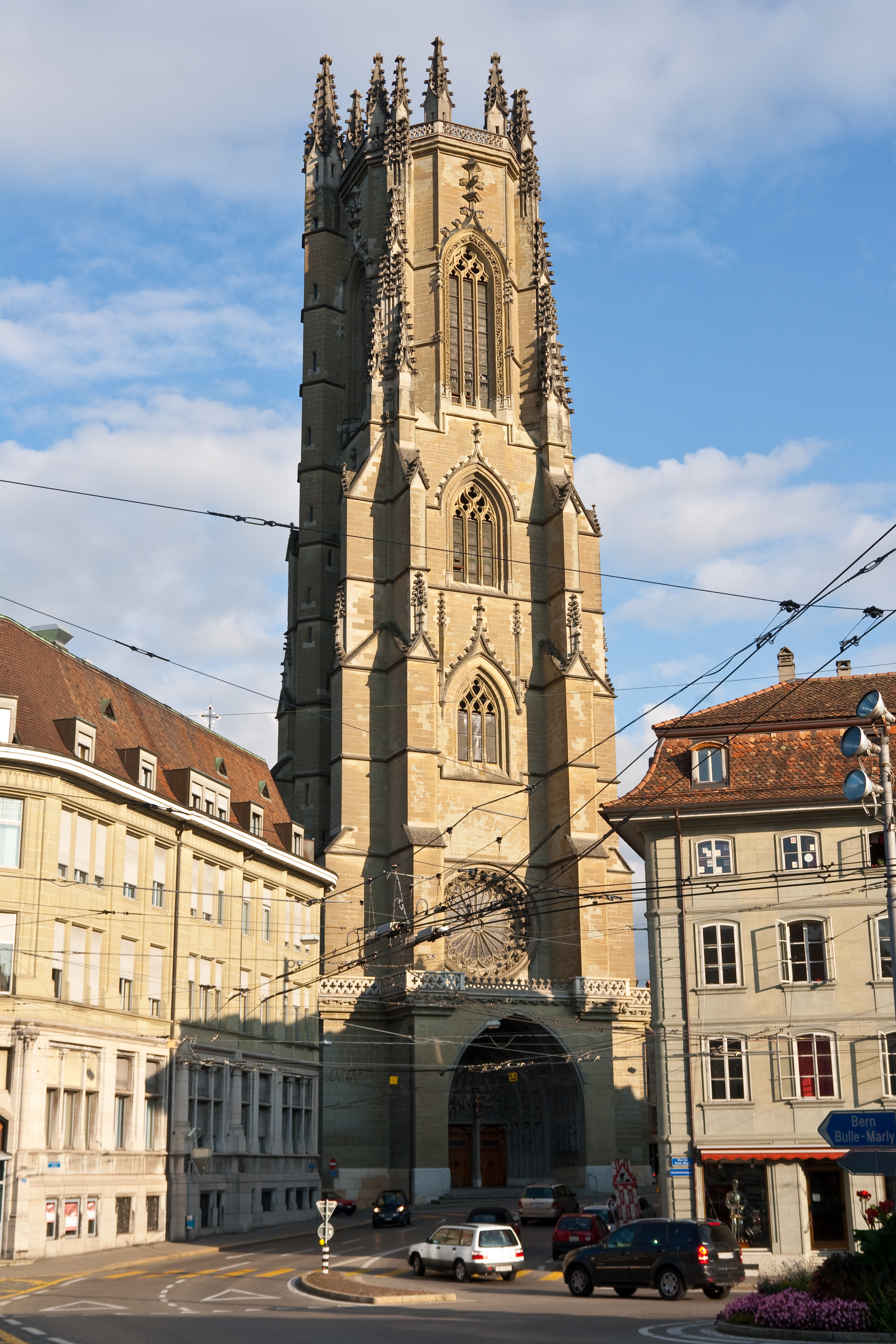
- Fribourg Cathedral, see of the Diocese of Lausanne, Geneva and Fribourg

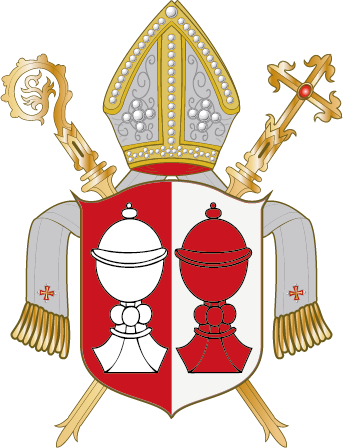
- Coat of arms

Location
- Country: Switzerland
- Territory: Lausanne, Geneva and Fribourg
- Metropolitan: Immediately subject to the Holy See

Statistics
- Area: 5,557 km^{2} (2,146 sq mi)
- Population: Total; Catholics: (as of 2021); ▲1,770,069; ▲717,000 (guess) (▲40.5%)
- Parishes: 248

Information
- Denomination: Catholic Church
- Sui iuris church: Latin Church
- Rite: Roman Rite
- Established: 6th Century (As Diocese of Lausanne); 30 January 1821 (As Diocese of Lausanne and Genève); 17 October 1924 (As Diocese of Lausanne, Genève and Fribourg)
- Cathedral: Fribourg Cathedral
- Patron saint: St Nicholas
- Secular priests: 244 (diocesan); 159 (Religious Orders); 35 Permanent Deacons

Current leadership
- Pope: Leo XIV
- Bishop: Charles Morerod
- Auxiliary Bishops: Pierre Farine; Alain de Raemy

Map
- Map of the diocese of Lausanne, Geneva and Fribourg within Switzerland

Website
- diocese-lgf.ch

The Diocese of Lausanne, Geneva and Fribourg (Latin: Dioecesis Lausannensis, Genevensis et Friburgensis) is a Latin Catholic diocese in Switzerland, which is (as all sees in the Alpine country) exempt (i.e. immediately subject to the Holy See, not part of any ecclesiastical province). The original diocese of Lausanne was a suffragan of the archdiocese of Besançon until 1801. The diocese of Geneva was a suffragan of the archdiocese of Vienne.

The diocese covers the cantons of Fribourg, Geneva, Vaud and Neuchâtel, with the exception of certain parishes of the right bank of the Rhône belonging to the Diocese of Sion (Sitten). It was created by the merger in 1821 of the Diocese of Lausanne and the Diocese of Geneva, both prince-bishoprics until they were secularized during the Reformation. Until 1924, it was called the Diocese of Lausanne and Geneva. The diocese has its seat at Fribourg. The current bishop is Charles Morerod, O.P., who was ordained and installed on 11 December 2011.

Despite the name, it has no direct link with the former Diocese of Geneva (400-1801), which was merged into the then Diocese of Chambéry, which was promoted to a Metropolitan see but lost former Genevan territory to the Diocese of Lausanne in 1819.

== History ==
=== Lausanne ===
The origin of the See of Lausanne can be traced to the ancient See of Windisch (Vindonissa). Bubulcus, the first Bishop of Windisch, appeared at the imperial Synod of Epaone for the Arelatic Kingdom of the Burgundians in 517. The second and last known Bishop of Windisch was Gramatius (Grammatius), who signed the decrees of the Synods of Clermont in 535, of Orléans, 541, and that of Orléans in 549. It was generally believed that shortly after this the see was transferred from Windisch to Konstanz, until investigations, particularly by Marius Besson, made it probable that, between 549 and 585, the see was divided and the real seat of the bishops of Windisch transferred to Avenches (Aventicum), while the eastern part of the diocese was united with the Diocese of Konstanz.

Lausanne was originally a suffragan of the archbishopric of Lyon (certainly about the seventh century), later of Besançon, from which it was detached by the French Napoleonic Concordat of 1801.

In medieval times, as attested by the charter of the Emperor Henry IV, the diocese extended from the Aar, near Solothurn, to the northern end of the Valley of St. Imier, thence along the Doubs and the ridge of the Jura Mountains to where the Aubonne flows into Lake Geneva, and thence along the north of the lake to Villeneuve whence the boundary-line followed the watershed between Rhône and Aar to the Grimsel, and down the Aar to Attiswil. In addition to confirming previous grants, Henry gave the diocese the places called Muratum, Lustriacum, Carbarissa, Corise, Cubizaca, Leuco and Natres. These are mentioned in the bull "Cogit nos" of Pope Alexander III of 17 October 1179, in which he takes the diocese of Lausanne under papal protection at the request of the recently elected Bishop Roger.

Thus the diocese included the town of Solothurn and part of its territory that part of the Canton of Bern which lay on the left bank of the River Aar, also Biel/Bienne, the Valley of St. Imier, Jougne and Les Longevilles in the Franche-Comté, the countships of Neuchâtel and Valangin, the greater part of the Canton of Vaud, the Canton of Fribourg, the countship of Gruyère and most of the Bernese Oberland.

The present diocese includes the Cantons of Fribourg, Vaud and Neuchâtel.

=== Bishops ===
Bishop Marius of Avenches attended the Synod of Mâcon of 585. The "Chartularium of Lausanne" affirms that St. Marius was born in the Burgundian Diocese of Autun about 530, was consecrated Bishop of Avenches in May 574 and died on 31 December 594. Marius wrote an addition (455–581) to the Chronicle of St. Prosper of Aquitaine. The episcopal see of Avenches may have been transferred to Lausanne by Marius, or possibly not before 610.

The most distinguished subsequent bishops are: Heinrich von Lenzburg (d. 1019), who rebuilt the cathedral, which was completed c. 1000; Hugo (1019–1037), a son of Rudolf III of Burgundy, in 1037 proclaimed the "Peace of God"; Burkart von Oltingen (1057–1089), one of the most devoted adherents of Emperor Henry IV, with whom he was banished, and made the pilgrimage to Canossa; Guido von Merlen (1130–1144), a correspondent of Bernard of Clairvaux; Amadeus of Hauterive, a Cistercian (1144–1459), who wrote homilies in honour of the Blessed Virgin. During the administration of Bishop Amedeus, Pope Eugenius III visited Lausanne between 14 and 20 May 1148.

Boniface of Brussels (1231–1239) was formerly a master in the Sorbonne University of Paris and head of the cathedral school at Cologne; he resigned because of physical ill-treatment, and was later appointed auxiliary bishop at Liège and then at Utrecht. The Benedictine Louis de la Palud (1432–1440) took part in the Councils of Konstanz (1414), Pavia-Siena (1423) and Basel (1431) and at Basel, in January 1432, was chosen Bishop of Lausanne, against Jean de Prangins, the chapter's choice; Palud was later vice-chamberlain of the conclave, in which Amadeus VIII, Duke of Savoy was elected Antipope Felix V, by whom he was made a cardinal.

Bishop George of Saluzzo was a notable episcopal legislator. On 17 May 1453, he formalised an agreement with the canons of the cathedral as a set of Statutes. On 2 June 1453, he published statutes and regulations for the episcopal court of the Official. He also published synodical constitutions for the reform of the clergy; Cardinal Giuliano della Rovere (1472–1476) in 1503 ascended the papal throne as Pope Julius II.

Meanwhile, the bishops of Lausanne, who had been Counts of Vaud since the time of Rudolph III of Burgundy (1011), and until 1218 subject only to imperial authority, were in 1270 granted the status of prince of the Holy Roman Empire, but their temporal power only extended over a small part of the diocese, namely over the city and district of Lausanne, as well as a few towns and villages in the Cantons of Vaud and Fribourg; on the other hand, the bishops possessed many vassals among the most distinguished of the patrician families of what is now western Switzerland.

==== Diocesan government ====
For the government of the diocese there were, besides the bishop, two vicars-general, one living at Geneva, the other at Fribourg. Though the office existed in the church for more than a century, the earliest known vicar-general in Lausanne was Bishop Joannes of Lacedaemon (1299–1300). There was, moreover, a provicarius generalis, who is also chancellor of the diocese, and a secretary.

==== Advocates ====
At least as early as 813, at the Council of Mainz, summoned by Charlemagne, the bishops advised all bishops and abbots, as well as the whole clergy, that they should have good vicedomini, provosts, and advocates or defenders. An advocate Trogo is known at Lausanne in 885, and an Elduin in 896. A count Anselm, perhaps a count of Equestres, is recorded between 926 and 954.

The guardianship of the ecclesiastical property (advocati, avoués) of the see was in the hands of the counts of Genevois by the end of the 11th century; then the lords of Gerenstein, the dukes of Zähringen (c. 1156); the counts of Kyburg (1218); and finally the counts (later dukes) of Savoy. These guardians, whose only duty originally was the protection of the diocese, enlarged their jurisdiction at the expense of the diocesan rights and even filled the episcopal see with members of their families.

On 18 December 1480, Abbot Franciscus de Villarsel of the Benedictine abbey of S. John Erlacensis, acting as arbiter, published the negotiated terms of an agreement between Bishop Benoit de Montferrand and the Syndics of the community of Lausanne concerning the reciprocal rights of the two parties. In July 1481, upper Lausanne (the city) and lower Lausanne (the bourg) united into one community, giving all the burghers greater influence in civil affairs. Quarrels broke out between the city of Lausanne and the bishop, which in 1482 ended up being litigated in the council of the Duke of Savoy. Quarrels continued, during which the city of Lausanne, with the aid of Bern and Fribourg, acquired new rights, and gradually freed itself from episcopal suzerainty. When Bishop Sebastian de Montfaucon (1517–1560) took sides with the Duke of Savoy in a battle against Bern, the Bernese used this as a pretext to seize the city of Lausanne.

=== Chapter and cathedral ===
The cathedral chapter of Lausanne was in existence by the 9th century. The earliest known canons are attested in 856. By 1228, the Chapter had 32 canons. It was suppressed at the time of the Protestant Reformation and has never been re-established, in consequence of which the choice of a bishop rests with the Holy See.

The Second Lateran Council (1139) recognised the right of chapters to participate in the election of bishops, but forbade them to exclude from the process "religious persons" (laity). Without their presence and assent, the election was void. The document called the "Rights of the Bishops of Lausanne and the Customs of the City" recognises the right of the canons to engage in the free election of a bishop. The Fourth Lateran Council (1215) ruled that elections for a bishop were to be conducted by the college of canons, and clandestine elections were forbidden; anyone elected through the abuse of secular power became ineligible for the office and could not hold another dignity. Since the Reformation, the bishops of Lausanne have been directly appointed by the pope.

The leaders of the town of Fribourg had built the church of Saint Nicholas, and staffed it with seven priests who carried on its liturgical functions. They were eager to increase its status and stability, and had petitioned the cardinal legate, Reymond Perrault (1502–1504), to carry their case to the papal court. The cardinal, however, died in 1505. In 1512 Pope Julius II finally agreed to their petition, and established a collegiate chapter in the church of St. Nicholas at Fribourg, which was made immediately subject to the Holy See, with a provost, a dean, a cantor, and twelve canons. The citizens of Fribourg were granted the right to nominate candidates to a vacancy, but the right to approve and institute the provost was reserved to the pope; the bishop had the right to institute the dean; and the cantor and canons were instituted by the provost. This collegiate church served in the place of a diocesan cathedral, lacking since the cathedral of St. Pierre at Geneva and that of Notre-Dame at Lausanne were given over to Protestantism at the time of the Reformation.

=== The Reformation ===
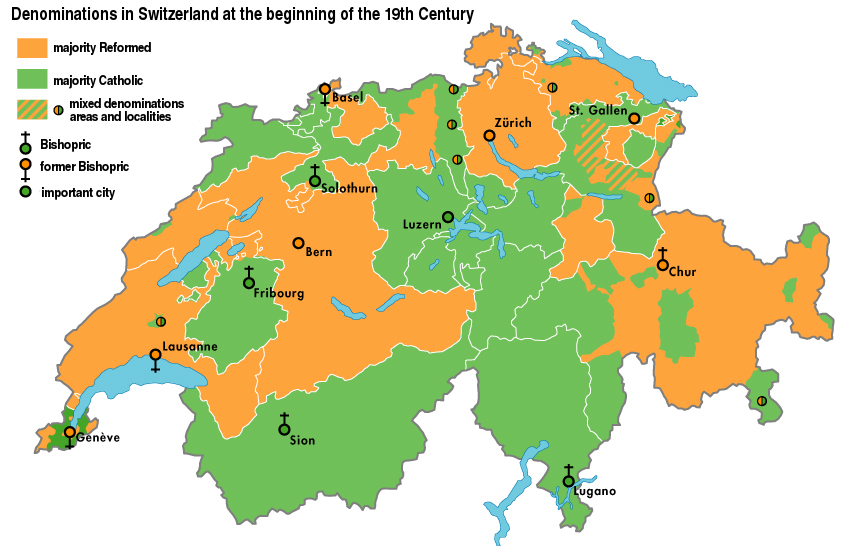
Religious affiliations c. 1800

The cantons of Vaud, Neuchâtel and Bern were entirely lost by the See of Lausanne to the Reformation. Due to the political union of Bern, Fribourg and Lausanne, the Protestant preacher William Farel was able to preach in public in Lausanne in 1529.

On 31 March 1536, Hans Franz Nägeli, the leader of Bern, who was making war with the duke of Savoy over the Vaud, occupied Lausanne, banned the practice of the Catholic religion, and began a religious revolution. The bishop was obliged to flee, the ecclesiastical treasure was taken to Bern, the cathedral chapter was dissolved (and never re-established), while the cathedral was given over to the Swiss Reformed Church. Bishop Sebastian died an exile in 1560, and his three successors were likewise exiles. It was only in 1614, under Bishop Jean de Watteville, that the bishop's residence was provisionally established at Fribourg, where it has since remained.

Shortly after the relocation of the bishops of Lausanne to Fribourg, efforts began to institute a seminary for priests, in accordance with the directives of the Council of Trent. An approach was made to the Cantonal Government in 1583, but the project was rejected. In the meantime, a "maison d'exercices" was established in Fribourg in the 1680s, for a year's study before a priest took up a parish position. Finally, Bishop Pierre de Montenach established a proper seminary at the village of Surpierre, in the valley of the Broye, which lasted from 1692 to 1709. In November 1795, a diocesan seminary was established in Fribourg, conducted by the directors of the seminary of Besançon who had been expelled from their diocese by agents of the French revolution.

=== The French Revolution and its consequences ===
By the French revolutionary "Constitution Civile du Clergé" (24 August 1790), it was decreed that the country was to be divided into 83 departments, and each department was to have one diocese; the dioceses were organised into 10 "metropoles". In the neighborhood of Geneva, the parishes of the French Jura fell to the Diocese of Belley, which surrounded the city, and the department of Doubs was created with its center at Besançon. The diocese of Belley was assigned to the Métropole de l'Est, governed by the archbishop of Besançon. By the Concordat of 29 November 1801 between the First Consul Napoleon and Pope Pius VII, the diocese of Belley was assigned as a suffragan of the archdiocese of Besançon, while the territory of the diocese of Geneva was assigned to the ecclesiastical province of Vienne, and its title was suppressed.

In 1814 the parishes of Solothurn, in 1828 those of the Bernese Jura, and in 1864 also that district of Bern on the left bank of the Aar, were attached to the bishopric of Basle. To compensate for the losses to the northeast, and since the former diocese of Geneva had been incorporated into the Swiss Federation following the Congress of Vienna, Pius VII assigned, in a papal brief of 20 September 1819, the city of Geneva and twenty parishes belonging to the old Diocese of Geneva to the See of Lausanne. Subsequently, the government of Geneva petitioned the pope to remove the honorific title of bishop of Geneva from the diocese of Cambrai and transfer it to the bishop of Lausanne, which the pope did on 18 December 1820. The bishop, Petrus Tohias Yenni (1815-1845)) retained his residence at Fribourg, and since 1821 has borne the title and arms of the Bishops of Lausanne and Geneva. His vicar general resides at Geneva, and is always parish priest of that city.

=== Lausanne and Geneva ===
Bishop Yenni died on 8 December 1845 and was succeeded by Étienne Marilley. Marilley had been parish priest and archpriest at Geneva when, on 17 June 1845, he was expelled from the canton of Geneva by its civil government. He fled to Fribourg, where, in November 1845, he was appointed coadjutor bishop of Lausanne. His bulls had not yet been prepared when Bishop Yenni died, and therefore he was appointed bishop of Lausanne instead, on 19 January 1846. Deposed in 1848 by the Cantons of Bern, Geneva, Vaud and Neuchâtel, owing to serious differences with the Radical regime at Fribourg, Marilley was kept a prisoner for fifty days in the Château de Chillon, on Lake Geneva, and then spent eight years in exile in France; he was allowed to return to his diocese on 19 December 1856.

On 22 September 1864, Pope Pius IX appointed the vicar general of Geneva, Gaspard Mermillod, as titular bishop of Hebron and auxiliary bishop of Lausanne and Geneva. The appointment had been opposed by Bishop Marilley and Bishop Peter-Josef de Preux of Sion, but had been encouraged by Bishop Eugène Lachat of Basel and Bishop Karl Greith of Sankt Gallen. Mermillod has been characterized as "a dynamic personality, an effective preacher, socially adept and openly desirous of expanding the faith by conversions and missionary work. He attended the First Vatican Council in 1869 and 1870, and spoke vigorously and voted for the proposed doctrine of papal infallibility. His ultramontane position became a campaign issue in the canton of Geneva, and helped to return the anti-clerical and leftist Radical Party to power. They began to pass restrictive legislation against religious orders, refusing to deal with Mermillod, claiming correctly that the proper authority was the bishop of Lausanne. Mermillod appealed to Pius IX for help and in 1873, he detached the Genevese territory from the diocese of Lausanne, made it a separate apostolic vicariate, and appointed Mermillod as its vicar apostolic. By this action, Geneva was again severed from the Diocese of Lausanne and Freiburg, contrary to the wishes of the civil authorities, and, it was asserted, the wishes of a majority of the Catholic population. The Apostolic Vicariate of Geneva was not recognised by either the State Council of Geneva or the Swiss Federal Council, and Mermillod was banished from Switzerland by a 17 February 1873 decree of the Federal Council. He went into exile in Ferney, France, some 10 km (6.5 mi) to the north, from which he continued to govern Geneva. When the pope condemned this measure on the part of the Swiss, the Government answered, on 12 December 1873, by expelling the Nuncio. With the death of Pius IX in 1878, however, the papal government decided that the church would conform to the ecclesiastical laws of the Canton of Bern, and renounced permanently the plan to restore the diocese of Geneva.

After Bishop Marilley had resigned his diocese in 1879, Christophore Cosandey, the Provost at Fribourg's seminary, was elected Bishop of Lausanne and Geneva, and after his death in 1882, Mermillod was appointed bishop. Mermillod was able to return to Switzerland in 1883 and assume the government of the diocese of Lausanne. The Apostolic Vicariate of Geneva was given up; the conflict between Rome and the Government of the Swiss Federation ended. In 1890, Pope Leo XIII made Mermillod a cardinal and he moved to Rome. Joseph Déruaz was named as his successor.

== Bishops of Lausanne, Geneva and Fribourg ==
In 1924, stating that Fribourg was the capital of a Swiss Canton as well as of a district, and that the bishops of Lausanne and Geneva had lived in Fribourg for nearly three centuries, Pope Pius XI ordered that the diocese of Lausanne, in addition to having also the title of Geneva, should also add the title of Fribourg; that the collegiate church of S. Nicholas in Fribourg should be raised to the status of a cathedral; that the collegiate Chapter should become the cathedral Chapter, consisting of three dignities (Provost, Dean and Cantor) and seven residential prebendary canons, appointment of the dignities being reserved to the pope, the rest to the bishop. The new title was: The diocese of Lausanne, Geneva and Fribourg.

- Marius Besson (7 May 1920 – 22 February 1945, died);
- François Charrière (20 October 1945 – 29 December 1970, retired);
- Pierre Mamie (29 December 1970 – 9 November 1995, Retired);
- Amédée Grab O.S.B. (9 November 1995 – 12 June 1998, confirmed, Bishop of Chur);
- Bernard Genoud (18 March 1999 – 21 September 2010, died);
- Charles Morerod, O.P. (3 November 2011 – ).

== Education ==
Among the more important educational establishments within the diocese is the University of Fribourg, founded in 1889, by the City Council of Fribourg, with the permission of the Cantonal Council of Fribourg; it was preceded by and built upon the Academy of Jurisprudence, founded in 1763.

There is also the theological seminary of St. Charles at Fribourg, with seven ecclesiastical professors; the cantonal school of St. Michel, also at Fribourg, which comprises a German and French gymnasium, a Realschule (corresponding somewhat to the English first-grade schools) and commercial school, as well as a lyceum, the rector of which was a clergyman. This school had in 1910 about 800 pupils, with 40 ecclesiastical and as many lay professors. Three other cantonal universities existed in the diocese: Geneva (founded by John Calvin in 1559, and in 1873 raised to the rank of a university with five faculties); Neuchâtel (1866, academy; 1909, university); Lausanne (1537, academy; university since 1890, with five faculties). Geneva and Lausanne both have cantonal Protestant theological faculties, and Neuchâtel has a "Faculté de théologie de l'église indépendante de l'état".

== Statistics ==
In 1228, the cathedral Provost, Conon d'Estavayer, reported that there were 9 deaneries in the diocese, containing 301 parishes. The deanery of Lausanne, with the cathedral and 20 parishes; the deanery of Avenches (Aventica), with 36 parishes; the deanery of Soleure (Salodorensis), with 33 parishes; the deanery of Vevey (Viveis, cantons of Vaud and Fribourg), with 40 parishes; the deanery of Neuchâtel (Jura Vaudois, Jorat and Neuchâtel), with 72 parishes; the deanery of Outre-Venoge, with 32 parishes; the deanery of Ogo, with 28 parishes; the deanery of Fribourg, with 16 parishes; and the deanery of Bern, with 28 parishes.

Around 1900, according to Büchi and the Dictionnaire géographique de la Suisse, the diocese numbered approximately 434,049 Protestants and 232,056 Catholics; consequently, the latter formed nearly 35% of the whole population of the bishopric. The Catholics inhabit principally the Canton of Fribourg (excepting the Lake District) and the country parishes transferred to Geneva in 1515, four communes in the Canton of Neuchâtel, and ten in the Canton of Vaud. The Catholic population in the Cantons of Fribourg and Geneva consisted principally of farmers; in both of the other cantons it was also recruited from the labouring classes. The Catholics were distributed among 193 parishes, of which 162 were allotted to Lausanne, 31 to Geneva. The number of secular priests was 390, and those belonging to orders 70.

== Reports of sexual abuse ==
On 15 July 2020, a Vatican investigation revealed that the number of reported cases of abuse involving Catholic priests and monks serving in the Diocese of Lausanne, Geneva and Fribourg has been increasing over the past few years, and that the payment of financial compensation which people in the Diocese distributed for victims of abuse totaled CHF675,000 ($718,000) in 2018 – up from CHF425,000 in the previous year – according to figures released by the Vatican News Service. However, another Catholic Church inquiry found that Bishop Charles Morerod did not protect a former priest in the Diocese who was facing sex abuse allegations, but that he was unaware of the seriousness of the allegations when they were reported to him. The accused former priest, who submitted his resignation the previous month, was alleged to have sexually abused a 17-year-old and molested a fellow priest between 1998 and 2011.

== See also ==
- Bishop of Lausanne: historical annotated list of the bishops of Lausanne
- Roman Catholic Diocese of Geneva (historical, with list of bishops)
- Convent of Saint-Hyacinth, Fribourg
- List of Catholic dioceses in Switzerland

== Bibliography ==
- Conon d'Estavayer (1851). Cartulaire du Chapitre de Notre-Dame de Lausanne. (in French and Latin). Lausanne: G. Bridel 1851. [Mémoires et documents publiés par la Société d'histoire de la Suisse Romande, Vol. VI.]
- Duding, Claude-Antoine (1724). Status seu Epocha Ecclesiae Aventicensis, Nunc Lausannensis.. (in Latin). Éditeur non identifié, 1724.
- Dupraz, Emmanuel (1906). La Cathedrale de Lausanne : étude historique. (in French). Lausanne: Th. Sack.
- Eubel, Conradus, ed. (1913). Hierarchia catholica (in Latin). Vol. 1 (Tomus I) (second ed.). Münster: Libreria Regensbergiana.
- Eubel, Conradus, ed. (1914). Hierarchia catholica (in Latin). Vol. 2 (Tomus II) (second ed.). Münster: Libreria Regensbergiana. archived
- Gauchat, Patritius (Patrice) (1935). Hierarchia catholica. Vol. 4 (Tomus IV) (1592–1667). Münster: Libraria Regensbergiana.
- Gingins-La Serra; Forel, François (edd.). Mémoires et documents publiés par la Société d'histoire de la Suisse romande. (in French and Latin). Volume 7. Lausanne: G. Bridel, 1846.
- Hauréau, Barthélemy (1860). Gallia christiana: in provincias ecclesiaticas distributa. (in Latin). Vol. 15. Paris: Firmin Didot, 1860. pp. 323–422; Instrumenta pp. 126–184.
- Knapp, Charles (ed.) (1905). Dictionnaire géographique de la Suisse, (in French), Volume 3, Neuchâtel: Société neuchâteloise de géographie–Attinger frères, 1905. (pp. 20–54)
- Oechsli, Wilhelm (1922). History of Switzerland, 1499-1914. Cambridge University Press, 1922.
- Reymond, Maxime (1911), "L'évêque de Lausanne, comte de Vaud," (in French), in: Revue d'histoire ecclésiastique Suisse vol 5 (1911), pp. 1–20; 105–121.
- Reymond, Maxime (1912). Les dignitaires de l'église Notre-Dame de Lausanne jusqu'en 1536, (in French). [Mémoires et documents / Société d'histoire de la Suisse romande Volume 8]. Lausanne: G. Bridel & cie, 1912.
- Ritzler, Remigius; Sefrin, Pirminus (1952). Hierarchia catholica medii et recentis aevi. Vol. 5 (Tomus V) (1667–1730). Patavii: Messagero di S. Antonio.
- Ritzler, Remigius; Sefrin, Pirminus (1958). Hierarchia catholica medii et recentis aevi. Vol. 6 (Tomus VI) (1730–1799). Patavii: Messagero di S. Antonio.
- Schmitt, Martin (1858). Mémoires historiques sur le Diocèse de Lausanne, Volume 1 (in French). Fribourg: Impr. J.-L. Piller, 1858. Volume 2

=== External links ===
- Reinhold, Gregor. "Lausanne and Geneva (Lausannensis et Genevensis)." The Catholic Encyclopedia. Vol. 9. New York: Robert Appleton Company, 1910; retrieved: 11 February 2024.
- David M. Cheney, Catholic-hierarchy.org, Diocese of Lausanne, Geneva and Fribourg; retrieved: 2 February 2024.
- Gabriel Chow, GCatholic, Diocese of Lausanne, Geneva and Fribourg; retrieved: 2 February 2024.
