= Pontifical Biblical Commission =

Body within the Roman Curia

The Pontifical Biblical Commission (Latin: Pontificia Commissio Biblica) is a pontifical commission established within the Roman Curia to ensure the proper interpretation and defense of the Bible. Since 1988, it has been closely attached to the Congregation for the Doctrine of the Faith, whose prefect heads the Commission. In March 2022, Pope Francis reaffirmed that relationship with his apostolic constitution Praedicate evangelium, effective 5 June 2022, even as it changed the Congregation's name to the Dicastery for the Doctrine of the Faith.

== History ==
=== Formation ===
The Pontifical Biblical Commission was established as a committee of cardinals, aided by consultors, who met in Rome to ensure the proper interpretation and defense of Sacred Scripture. This function was outlined in Pope Leo XIII's encyclical Providentissimus Deus.

The first appointments to the commission were made in August 1901, but it was not formally established by Pope Leo XIII until October 30, 1902, with the Apostolic Letter Vigilantiae Studiique. The first commission was composed of three cardinals and 12 consultors.

The consultors met twice a month, with secretaries present. The secretaries reported to the cardinals on the commission, who met on the 2nd and 4th Sundays of each month. The cardinals proposed questions for the consultors to consider and voted on the answers received from the consultors. The cardinals could send questions back to the consultors for further study, commission a single consultor to investigate a matter more deeply, or sanction or modifying the study results. If a decision was reached, the secretaries reported to the Pope, who could send the matter back for further study, or ratify the results of the study.

The duties of the commission were:

1. to protect and defend the integrity of the Catholic Faith in Biblical matters
2. to further the progress of exposition of the Sacred Books, taking account of all recent discoveries
3. to decide controversies on grave questions which might arise among Catholic scholars
4. to give answers to Catholics throughout the world who may consult the commission
5. to see that the Vatican Library was properly furnished with codices and necessary books
6. to publish studies on Scripture as occasion might demand.

=== Early developments ===
The commission was granted the power to grant pontifical academic degrees in biblical studies by Pope Pius X's Apostolic Letter Scripturae sanctae of February 23, 1904.

Pope Pius XI, in his Motu Proprio Bibliorum scientia of April 27, 1924, and the Apostolic Constitution Deus scientiarum Dominus of May 24, 1931, clarified that such degrees were equivalent in status to those of the Pontifical Universities.

=== Developments since the Second Vatican Council ===
On June 27, 1971, Pope Paul VI issued the motu proprio Sedula Cura ("On New Laws Regulating the Pontifical Biblical Commission"), restructuring the commission and placing it under the Congregation for the Doctrine of the Faith.

On 28 June 1988, Pope John Paul II's Apostolic Constitution Pastor Bonus confirmed the commission's relationship to the Congregation for the Doctrine of the Faith, with the prefect of the Congregation for the Doctrine of the Faith the ex officio president of the Pontifical Biblical Commission. The Commission has its own secretary, who to date has been a professor of the Pontifical Biblical Institute. Since 9 March 2021 the secretary has been Núria Calduch, the first female secretary.

The members are Catholic biblical scholars proposed by the Bishops' Conferences. In 2014 Pope Francis appointed women to the commission for the first time, including Mary Healy.

== Current members ==
As of 2025:

- President: Cardinal Víctor Manuel Fernández, (Prefect of the Congregation for the Doctrine of the Faith, since July 1, 2023)
- Secretary: Sr. Núria Calduch Benages M.N., since March 9, 2021
- Fr. Paul Béré, S.J., since 2020 [fr]
- Federico Giuntoli, since 2020
- Fr. Marcin Kowalski, since 2020 [pl]
- Fr. Philippe Lefebvre, O.P., since 2020 [fr]
- Bénédicte Lemmelijn, since 2020 [nl]
- Maria Armida Nicolaci, since 2020
- Fr. Henry Pattarumadathil, S.J., since 2020
- Fr. Blazej Štrba, since 2020
- Knut Backhaus, since 2014 [de]
- Fr. Eduardo Córdova González, since 2014
- Bruna Costacurta, since 2014 [it]
- Msgr. Pierre Debergé, since 2014 [fr]
- Fr. Luís Henrique Eloy e Silva, since 2014
- Fr. Adrian Graffy, since 2014
- Mary Healy, since 2014
- Fr. Hugo Orlando Martínez Aldana, since 2014
- Bp. Levente Balázs Martos, since 2014 [de]
- Fr. Jean-Bosco Matand Bulembat, since 2014

The Technical Secretary is Fr. Alessandro Belano, F.D.P.

== See also ==
- Catholic theology of Scripture
- Pontifical commission
