= International Theological Commission =

Group of Roman Catholic theologians

- Commissionis Theologicae Internationalis

Agency overview
- Formed: April 11, 1969; 57 years ago
- Agency executive: Víctor Manuel Fernández, President
- Parent department: Dicastery for the Doctrine of the Faith

The International Theological Commission (ITC) is a body of the Roman Curia of the Catholic Church; it advises the magisterium of the church, particularly the Dicastery for the Doctrine of the Faith (DDF), a dicastery of the Roman Curia. Its memberships consists of no more than 30 Catholic theologians appointed by the pope at the suggestion of the prefect of the DDF for renewable five year terms. They tend to meet annually for a week in Rome, where the commission is based.

The commission is closely aligned with the DDF, whose prefect is ex officio the president of the ITC. In March 2022, Pope Francis reaffirmed that relationship with his apostolic constitution Praedicate evangelium, effective 5 June 2022, even as it changed the name of the Congregation for the Doctrine of the Faith (CDF) to the Dicastery for the Doctrine of the Faith (DDF), as part of a reorganization and reform of the Roman Curia.

== History ==
The ITC traces its origins to an idea presented at the first General Assembly of the Synod of Bishops in 1967. It was established on an interim basis by Pope Paul VI on 11 April 1969. His first appointments were announced on 1 May 1969. The first meeting of the ITC took place on 6–8 October 1969 and was presided over by Cardinal Franjo Šeper. Four working groups were set up for the duration of the first term to explore: (i) the unity of the Faith, (ii) the priesthood, (iii) the theology of hope: the Christian Faith and the future of humanity, (iv) the criteria for Christian moral conscience. The October plenary session of 1970 studied a paper on "The Priestly Ministry" prepared by the sub-commission on the priesthood. At the October plenary session of 1972, the ITC studied the topic of Theological Pluralism prepared by the subcommission on the unity of the faith. According to one historian, the ITC contributed the DDF's statement Mysterium Ecclesiae, issued in 1973, a wide-ranging defense of the church in the modern world.

In October 1969, at the first meeting of the ITC, Karl Rahner had produced a document on the principal questions which he believed should be addressed. However, Rahner resigned after the first term, saying that the ITC was "stewing in its own juices". His complaint was that the DDF, and in particular Cardinal Seper, were not prepared to seriously consult the ITC on questions of the day. After five years, only thirteen of the original thirty theologians were reappointed. The plenary session of October 1974 addressed the topic of Christian Ethics.

On 6 August 1982, Pope John Paul II issued Tredecim anni to confirm the institutional structure of the ITC.

Since 2004, women are allowed to be members of the ITC.

== Leadership ==
=== Presidents ===
The prefect of the Dicastery for the Doctrine of the Faith is president of the commission ex officio. They have been:

- Franjo Šeper (1969–1981)
- Joseph Ratzinger (1981–2005)
- William Joseph Levada (2005–2012)
- Gerhard Ludwig Müller (2012–2017)
- Luis Francisco Ladaria Ferrer, S.J. (2017–2023)
- Víctor Manuel Fernández (2023-present)

=== Secretary general ===
The secretaries general have been:

- Philippe Delhaye (1972-1989)
- Georges Cottier, O.P. (1989-2004)
- Luis Ladaria Ferrer, S.J. (2004-2009)
- Charles Morerod, O.P. (2009-2011)
- Serge-Thomas Bonino, O.P. (France) (2011-2021)
- Piero Coda (2021-present)

== Reports ==
The commission produces reports on an irregular schedule. In 2018 it released its 28th document. Some address topics of broad interest and attract media attention, while others are little noted outside a scholarly and clerical audience. The 2018 document "Synodality in the Life and Mission of the Church" was an important contribution to the theology of synodality, developing with the experience of participation in a global consultation among the People of God, convoked by Pope Francis in 2021- 2024 for a 'Synod on Synodality'.

In 1976, the ITC issued a report on liberation theology, titled "Human Development and Christian Salvation". It warned that Marxist-Leninist analysis because it rests on dubious assumptions and privileges action over the understanding that is the foremost aim of theological inquiry. In 1997, the commission produced the document "Christianity and the Religions", a discussion of religious pluralism. In 2004, the document "Communion and Stewardship: Human Persons Created in the Image of God" considered the relationship between creation, evolution, and Christian faith.

In "The Hope of Salvation for Infants Who Die without Being Baptised" in 2007, the commission discussed the traditional belief that unbaptized children cannot enter heaven, but remain in limbo, denied access to the presence of God. It said this belief had no theological foundation, that revelation provided no clear guidance on the issue, and called it an "unduly restricted view of salvation", though it remains a possible view. Popular media interpreted this as a rejection of the very concept of limbo.
