= Pontifical University of Saint Anthony =

- Pontificia Università Antonianum
- Latin: Pontificia Universitas Antonianum
- Established: Built 1890 (Officially established in 1933)
- Religious affiliation: Franciscans
- Rector: Giuseppe Buffon OFM
- Location: Rome, Italy; 41°53′21″N 12°30′15″E
- Website: www.antonianum.eu
- Location on a map of Rome

The Pontifical University of Saint Anthony, also known as the Antonianum (Latin: Pontificia Universitas Antonianum, Italian: Pontificia Università Antonianum), and formerly as Pontifical Athenaeum Antonianum, is a Franciscan pontifical university in Rome named in honour of Anthony of Padua. It is located in the Rione Esquiline, a block north of the Basilica of St John Lateran, at Via Merulana 124, near the intersection of Via Labicana/Viale Manzoni and Via Merulana.

== History ==
In 1883, Father Bernardino Dal Vago da Portogruaro (1869–1889), Minister General of the Order of Friars Minor, proposed the construction of a new academic college:

So that the [Franciscan] Order will, in due course, be lit by very learned men and well versed in individual academic subjects and each province will be glorious and benefit from these professors and teachers.

Construction of the university began in 1884 and the institution was opened 6 years later in 1890 by Luigi Canali (1889–1897).

To obtain legal recognition from the Italian state, the university was founded as a Missionary College attached to the Roman Curia and the Propaganda Fide. Although this allowed the university to open and operate, missionary work was not the original aim of the university and its academic leaders were keen to secure recognition for the institution in its own right. The process was delayed first by World War I, and then by the publication of Pope Pius XI's Apostolic Constitution Deus Scientiarum Dominus in 1931, which dictated new rules for academic study. Finally, on 17 May 1933, the Congregation of Seminaries and Universities issued a decree granting the university the right to issue academic qualifications.

In 1926 the college inaugurated a philosophical-theological review entitled Antoniarum.

On 14 June 1938, the institution was granted the right to use the title Pontifical by Pope Pius XI. On 11 January 2005, Pope John Paul II granted the University the right to use the Pontifical University title.

== Faculties ==
The University has four faculties and a number of associated institutes, which run approximately 180 courses per year:

- Faculty of Theology
- Faculty of Biblical Sciences and Archaeology (Studium Biblicum Franciscanum in Jerusalem)
- Faculty of Canon Law
- Faculty of Philosophy

The University also includes the Franciscan Institute of Spirituality, operated by the Order of Friars Minor Capuchin.

== Ethics, Technologies & Artificial Intelligence ==
Ethics, Technologies and Artificial Intelligence

Starting from the 2024 academic year, the University has launched research groups and study programs dedicated to the ethics of artificial intelligence, integrating these activities into its scientific and educational offering. These initiatives are part of a broader focus on innovation, digital transformation, and integral ecology, addressed through an interdisciplinary approach.

During the same period, the University has progressively developed collaborations with Italian institutions, including both ministerial bodies and other entities within the public administration and research system. These collaborations have contributed to strengthening the University’s role as a national reference center for the study of the ethical, social, and environmental implications of emerging technologies.

As a result of these activities, the University has become a recognized hub for research and education on the ethics of artificial intelligence, responsible innovation, and integral ecology, with a positioning grounded in the integration of scientific production, institutional dialogue, and impact on public debate.
