= Georges Cottier =

Swiss Catholic cardinal (1922–2016)

His Eminence Georges Marie Martin Cottier OP
- Pro-Theologian Emeritus of Prefecture of the Papal Household
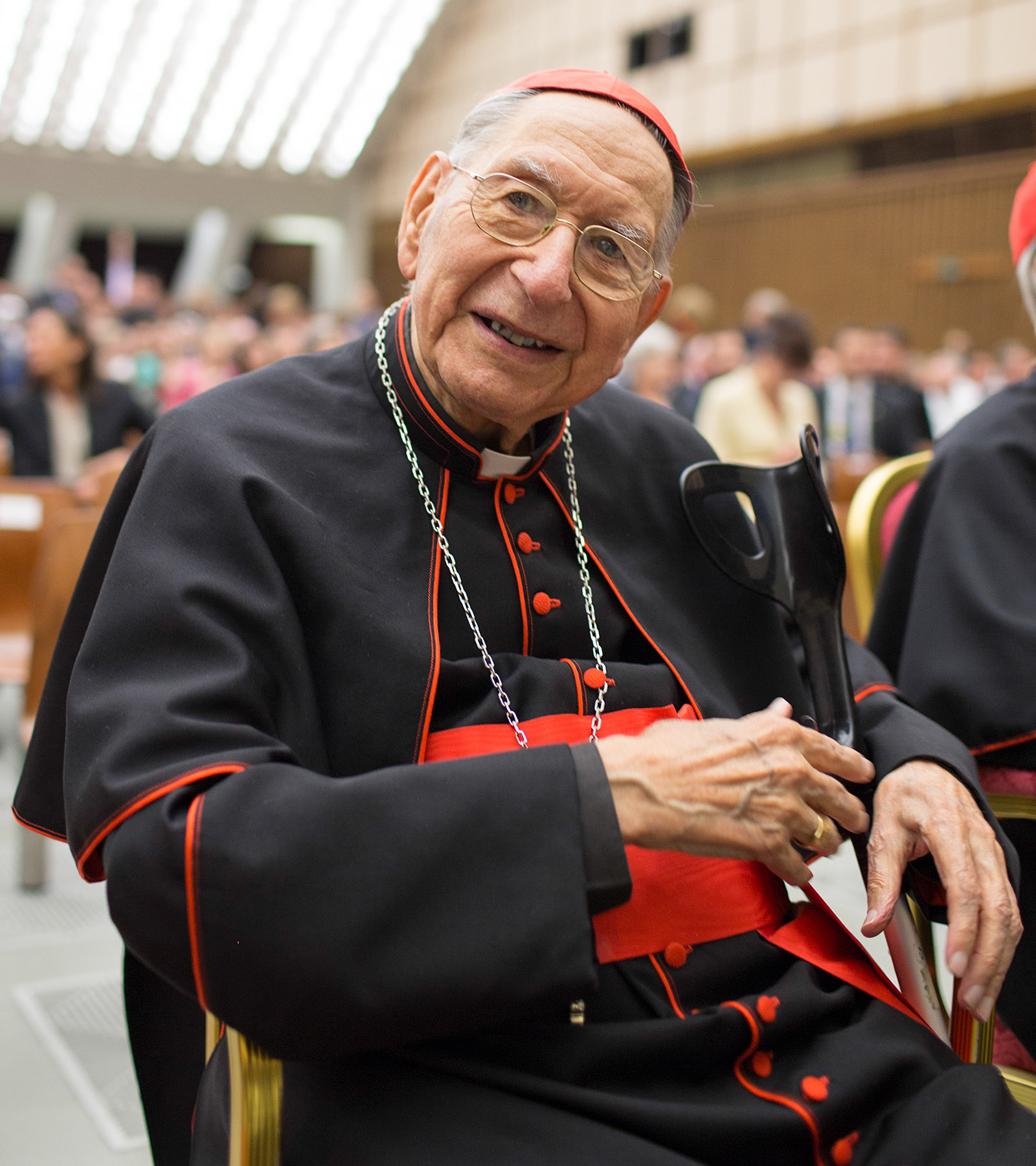
- Cottier, 2013
- Other posts: Secretary General of International Theological Commission (1989–2003); Theologian of the Papal Household (1990–2005)

Orders
- Ordination: 2 July 1951
- Consecration: 20 October 2003
- Created cardinal: 21 October 2003
- Rank: Cardinal Deacon (2003–14); Cardinal Priest (2014–16)

Personal details
- Born: 25 April 1922 Céligny, Switzerland
- Died: 31 March 2016 (aged 93) Vatican City
- Residence: Vatican City
- Coat of arms

Georges Marie Martin Cottier OP (French pronunciation: [ʒɔʁʒ maʁi maʁtɛ̃ kɔtje]; 25 April 1922 – 31 March 2016) was a Swiss Catholic prelate who served as Theologian of the Pontifical Household under Pope John Paul II from 1990 to 2005, after a career as a theologian and teacher. He was a member of the Dominicans and was made a cardinal in 2003.

== Biography ==
Cottier was born in Carouge, Switzerland, on 25 April 1922 and took his vows as a member of the Dominican Order on 4 July 1946. Cottier studied theology and philosophy at the Pontificium Athenaeum Internationale Angelicum, the future Pontifical University of Saint Thomas Aquinas, until 1952 obtaining a baccalaureate in philosophy and a licentiate in theology. While there he was ordained a priest on 2 July 1951.

He was a professor at the Universities of Geneva and Fribourg. He became a member of the International Theological Commission in 1986 and its secretary in 1989, a post he held until 2003. He was appointed Theologian of the Pontifical Household in 1990.

As papal theologian, he participated in the development of works authored by the pope, either drafting, researching, or editing. In 2004, Cottier told an interviewer: "Going back to the early years, the first “big” text I worked on was the social encyclical Centesimus annus. And then the Ut unum sint on ecumenicalism, the moral encyclical Veritatis splendor, and the Fides et ratio... also the Catechism of the Catholic Church."

He was appointed titular archbishop of Tullia in 2003 and received his episcopal consecration on 20 October 2003 to meet the requirement that only bishops be cardinals. The next day, 21 October, Pope John Paul II made him Cardinal-Deacon of Santi Domenico e Sisto.

His service as papal theologian ended on 1 December 2005.

After ten years, he exercised his option to become a member of the order of cardinal priests, to which Pope Francis gave his consent on 12 June 2014.

Cottier died on 31 March 2016. His funeral was celebrated in St. Peter's Basilica by Pope Francis on 1 April 2016.

== Views ==
In the run-up to President Barack Obama's 10 July 2009 meeting with Pope Benedict XVI, Cottier praised Obama's “humble realism” in recognizing that the president's "words move in the direction of reducing the evil [of abortion]," and in this manner might align to the thinking of St. Thomas Aquinas and early Christian tradition in terms of framing laws in a pluralistic society.

Cottier reacted to John Paul II's encyclical Ecclesia de Eucharistia by saying that the Catholic Church rejects the concept of open communion. Cottier defended the Church's view that the embryo is fully a human being.

He came out in defense of Pope Pius XII against those who continue to criticize his legacy.

Cottier was critical of anonymous Christianity, saying that a theological system that absorbs all realities into Christ ends by turning Christ into a kind of metaphysical postulate of the affirmation of human values, which makes the Church incapable of engaging in serious dialogue, even on the level of human rights. Then, saying that everybody is already of Christ, whether they know it or not, can make the mission futile.

Cottier said that the use of condoms may be morally licit in the context of fighting AIDS.

Catholic Church titles
Preceded by Mario Luigi Ciappi	Theologian of the Pontifical Household; 1989–2005	Succeeded by Wojciech Giertych
