= International Union of Superiors General =

Catholic organization of women religious

The International Union of Superiors General (UISG) is a Catholic organization representing about 600,000 sisters and nuns from 80 countries worldwide.

== Mission ==
The organization's stated mission is to:

- Provide an International Forum where Superiors General can share experiences and information
- Encourage dialogue and collaboration among religious congregations within the Church and larger society.
- Offer regular programs, meetings and publications to assist members in their development as leaders of religious congregations.
- Communicate with the Congregation for Institutes of Consecrated Life and Societies of Apostolic Life (CICLSAL) and other significant Church and social Organizations on matters concerning Religious Life.
- Foster networking and solidarity among the Women Religious of the world.

== History ==
Its origins date to the pontificate of Pope Pius XII, who supported its creation, later formalized after the Second Vatican Council. It offers a global forum for superiors general of institutions of Catholic women religious. It has evolved as a means of connecting women religious congregations with the council fathers. Its members include approximately 2000 leaders of congregations of apostolic women religious.

In May 2001, after the United Nations anti-trafficking treaty (the Palermo Protocols) was signed, the leaders of the UISG passed a resolution dedicating their members “to work in solidarity with one another within our own religious communities and in the countries in which we are located to address insistently at every level the abuse and sexual exploitation of women and children.”

In 2009 when American religious sisters were under investigation by the Vatican, the IUSG issued a strong statement of support for U.S. women religious congregations. The IUSG praised American women religious for living up to the directives and spirit of the Second Vatican Council.

The organization held its triennial meeting in Rome in 2016, led by Maltese Sister Carmen Sammut, president of the International Union of Superiors General and the general superior of the Missionary Sisters of Our Lady of Africa. Loreto Sister Patricia Murray, executive director of the union, highlighted initiatives taken by the group's headquarters in Rome, particularly the creation of a Council of Canon Lawyers. Five canon lawyers of the council, all women religious from five continents, advise the UISG on canonical matters and support women's congregations worldwide.

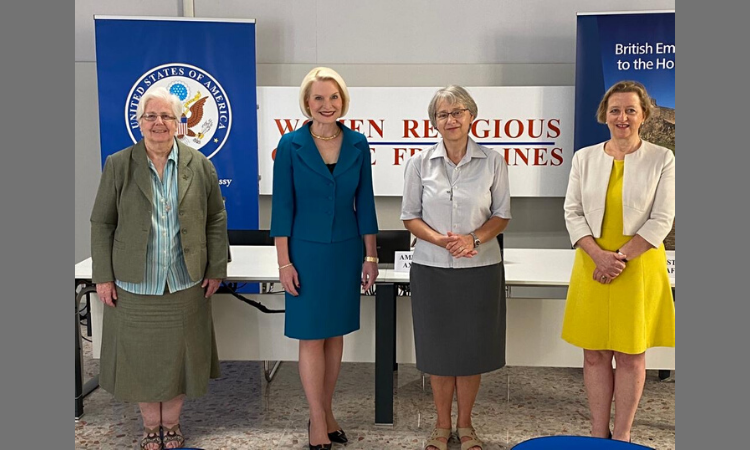
Sr. Pat Murray, IUSG's Executive Director, Callista Gingrich, the U.S. ambassador to the Holy See, Claretian Missionary Sister Jolanda Kafka, IUSG's President and Sally Axworthy, the British ambassador in 2020

In November 2018, the IUSG published a statement that called on women religious who have suffered abuse from priests or other clerics to report it to church and government authorities. The statement further noted: “We condemn those who support the culture of silence and secrecy, often under the guise of ‘protection’ of an institution's reputation or naming it ‘part of one’s culture’.” Three months later Pope Francis publicly acknowledged that nuns have accused clerics of sexual abuse in Italy, the Vatican, France, India, Latin America and Africa. Lucette Scaraffia, a feminist intellectual and the editor in chief of Women Church World, a Vatican magazine, noted that there were nuns having abortions or giving birth to children of clerics. In February 2019 Sister Veronica Openibo, a member of the IUSG executive board, became one of only three women invited to address the Vatican's unprecedented summit to address sexual abuse by clergy and cover-ups by church hierarchy. Openibo was one of 10 women religious participating in the summit.

In a May 2019 meeting at the Vatican with the International Union of Superiors General, Pope Francis called the abuse of nuns a “serious problem.” In addition to sexual abuse nuns are subject to, he also called out “abuse of power and abuse of conscience." In February 2022, Pope Francis said, “I invite them to fight when, in some cases, they are treated unfairly, even within the Church; when they serve so much that they are reduced to servitude — at times, by the men of the Church.”
