= Diocese of Chur =

Latin Catholic jurisdiction in Switzerland

Diocese of Chur Diœcesis Curiensis Bistum Chur (de) Uvestgieu da Cuira (rm) Diocesi di Coira (it)

Catholic
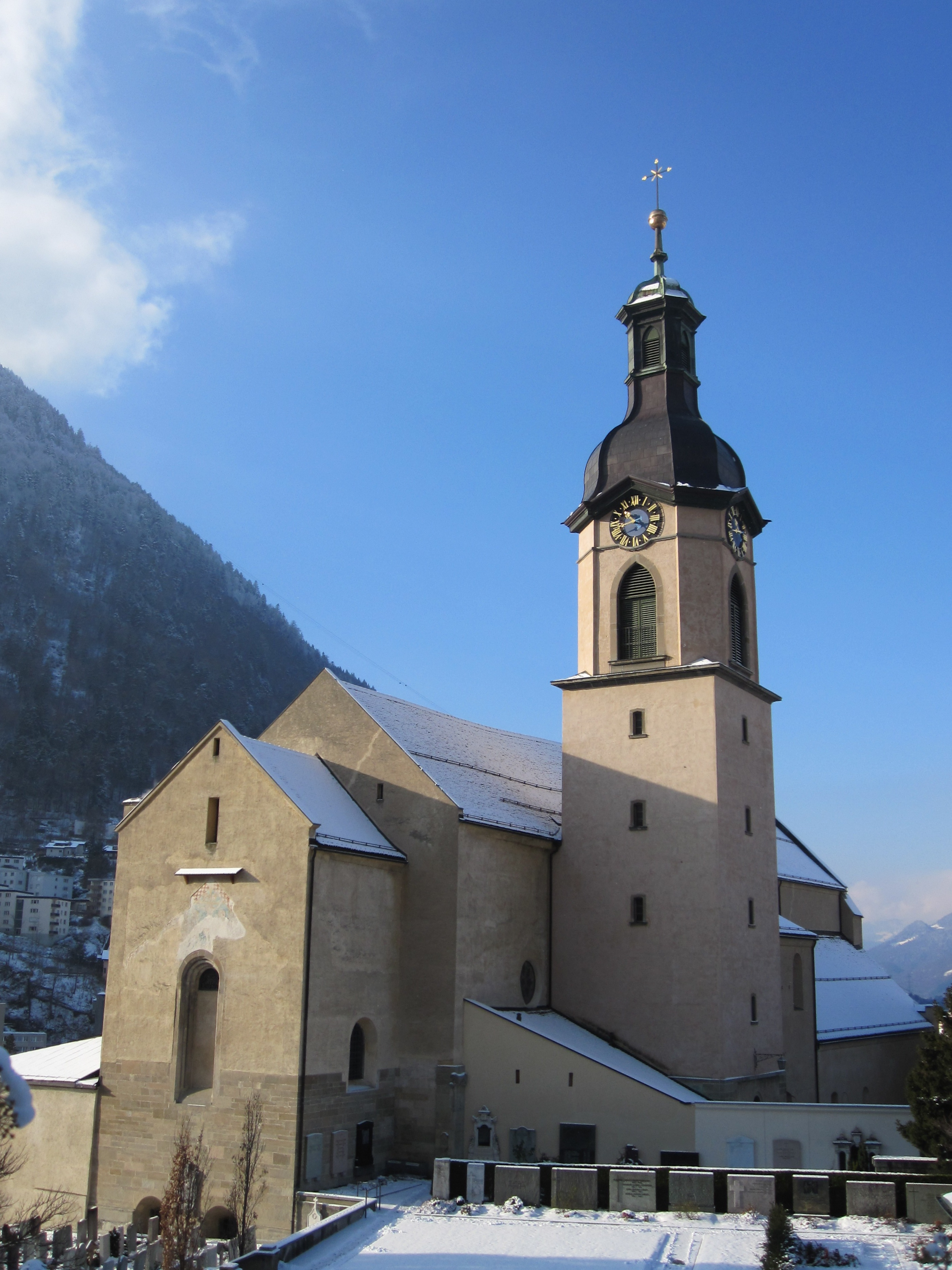
- Cathedral of Chur

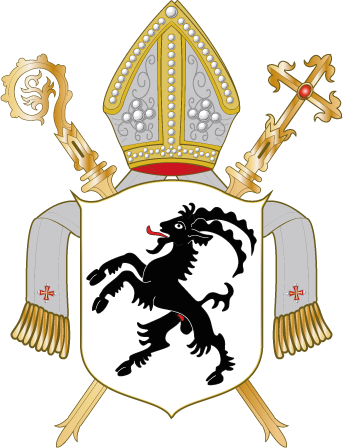
- Coat of arms

Location
- Country: Switzerland
- Territory: Graubünden, Schwyz, Uri, Glarus, Obwalden, Nidwalden, Zurich
- Metropolitan: Immediately subject to the Holy See

Statistics
- Area: 12,272 km^{2} (4,738 sq mi)
- Population: Total; Catholics: (as of 2022); 2,089,107; 677,220 (32.4%)

Information
- Denomination: Catholic Church
- Sui iuris church: Latin Church
- Rite: Roman Rite
- Established: 5th Century
- Cathedral: Cathedral of the Assumption
- Patron saint: St Lucius of Chur
- Secular priests: 590

Current leadership
- Pope: Leo XIV
- Bishop: Joseph Maria Bonnemain
- Vicar General: Martin Grichting, Luis Varandas
- Bishops emeritus: Marian Eleganti

Map
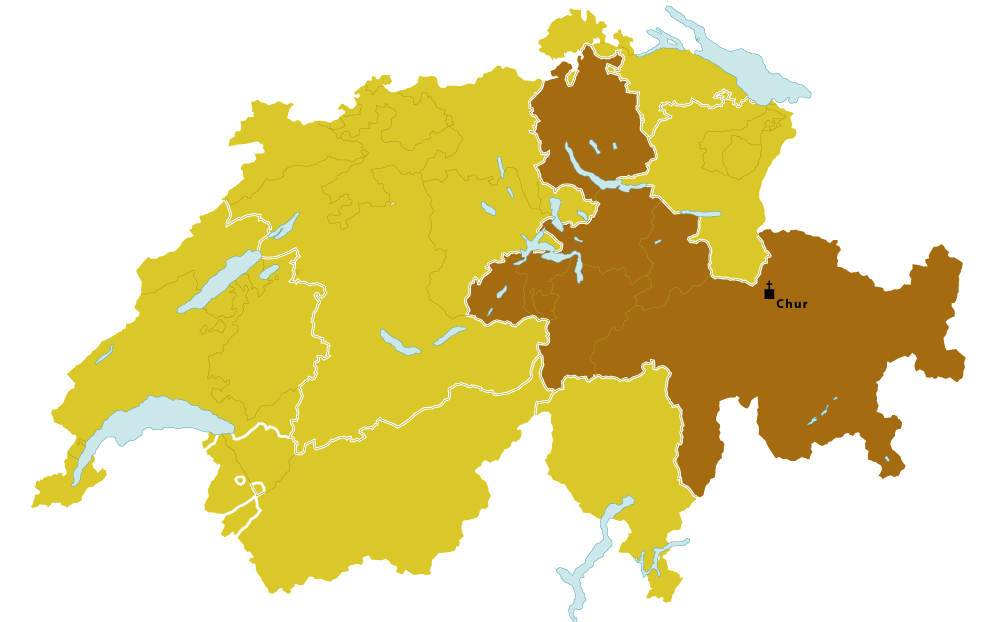

Website
- bistum-chur.ch

The Diocese of Chur (Latin: Diœcesis Curiensis) is a Latin Church ecclesiastical territory or diocese of the Catholic Church in Switzerland. It extends over the Swiss Cantons of Graubünden (Grisons), Schwyz, Glarus, Zurich, Nidwalden, Obwalden, and Uri where German is the primary language.

The modern Catholic diocese must be distinguished from the historical Prince-Bishopric of Chur, a state of the Holy Roman Empire.

== History ==
A Bishop of Chur is first mentioned in 451/ 452 when its Bishop Saint Asimo attended the Synod of Milan, but probably existed a century earlier. The see was at first suffragan to the Archbishop of Milan, but after the Treaty of Verdun (843), it became suffragan to Mainz. In consequence of political changes it became in 1803 immediately subject to the Holy See.

According to local traditions, the first Bishop of Chur was Saint Lucius, who is said to have died a martyr at Chur around the year 176 and whose relics are preserved in the cathedral. St. Lucius is venerated as the principal patron of the diocese. The country had to pass through very severe struggles for the Christian faith. Theodoric, King of the Ostrogoths, and the Lombards after him, attempted to introduce Arianism in the sixth and seventh centuries.

The bishop soon acquired great temporal powers, especially after his dominions were made in 831 dependent on the Empire alone. In the dispute between Emperor Barbarossa and Pope Alexander III, Bishop Egino of Chur sided with the emperor and was rewarded with the dignity of Prince of the Empire in 1170. The bishop was also temporal lord of the city and in several cases, a better warrior than pastor. The Prince-Bishopric of Chur became an independent state of the Holy Roman Empire, its borders being different from the borders of the diocese.

In 1367, the League of God's House was formed by members of the cathedral chapter, the bishop's own ministerialis, the city of Chur, and a number of jurisdictions of the prince-bishopric. The reason was that Bishop Peter Jelito, who mostly stayed abroad, was suspected by his own subjects of planning to sell the prince-bishopric to the House of Habsburg, with a loss of independence looming. Instead, Peter then became Bishop of Leitomischl in 1368 and archbishop of Magdeburg in 1371. In 1392, the next prince-bishop became the nominal head of the League. The Grey League was founded in 1395, as a reaction to various feuds between the Bishopric of Chur and its own vassals, namely the Barons of Belmont, the Barons of Vaz, the Barons of Sax, the Barons of Rhäzüns, the Counts of Werdenberg, the Barons of Matsch, the abbots of Disentis Abbey and others. Both leagues became part of the Three Leagues that later formed the Swiss canton of Graubünden. The Three Leagues, in fact a republic ruled by local aristocrats, remained part of the Holy Roman Empire until 1798, but has been allied to the Old Swiss Confederacy since 1497. Both, league and alliance, limited the power of the prince-bishops further.

The struggles of Switzerland for liberty in the fourteenth and fifteenth centuries, and, later, the secret preaching of Zwingli and Calvin, did great harm to the diocese, especially as the Catholic clergy neglected the instruction of the people. The bishop lost much of his power through the Reformation in 1526, after several nobles and towns had become Protestant. The Reformation was publicly proclaimed at Chur in 1524, and the two Catholic churches of St. Martin and St. Regula were given over to the Protestants, who retain possession of them to this day. The bishop fled, and his administrator, Abbot Theodore Schlegel, was publicly beheaded (1 January 1529). Bishop Thomas Planta, a friend of St. Charles Borromeo, tried, but without success, to suppress Protestantism. He died, probably poisoned, 5 May 1565. Twenty years later St. Charles sent the Capuchins into the endangered region, but Bishop Peter II (de Rascher) refused to admit them. His successor, Bishop John V (Flugi d'Aspermont, 1601–27), a saintly and courageous man, endeavoured to restore the Catholic religion, but was compelled to flee three times (1607, 1612, and 1617), and for several years a bloody war was waged between the Catholics and the Protestants. Finally, the newly erected Congregation of Propaganda commissioned the Capuchins to 'save the Catholic faith' among the people (1621). The first Capuchin superior of the mission was St. Fidelis of Sigmaringen, who, on his way from Sewis to Grüsch, a little north of Chur, was slain (24 April 1622) by peasants whom the sermons of the Protestant preachers had wrought up to a fury. Some relics of this martyr are preserved in the cathedral at Chur. A second mission, that of Misocco and Calanca, in the southern part of the diocese, was entrusted to the Capuchins in 1635. These two missions, Rhætiæ and Mesauci, were made prefectures Apostolic under the care of Italian Capuchins and these prefects resided in the towns of Obervaz and Cama, both in the Canton of Graubünden.

Four of Chur's bishops are honoured as saints: Saint Asimo (c. 450), Saint Valentinian (530–548), Saint Ursicinus (d. 760), and Saint Adalbert(1151–60).

Saint Sigisbert flourished about the year 600, Saint Pirminus a century later; Saint Florian, whom the diocese has chosen as its second patron, lived in the ninth century, the hermit Saint Gerold in the tenth. The Capuchin Theodosius Florentini, vicar-general from 1860 till his death (15 February 1865), was a very distinguished missionary; in 1852 he erected the Hospital of the Cross at Chur; before this he had already laid the foundations of two female religious congregations, one for the instruction of children, the other for the care of the sick.

== In 1906 ==
According to the "Kirchliches Handlexicon" (Munich, 1906) the diocese had a Catholic population of about 248,887 (non-Catholics, 431,367). There were 358 secular and 226 religious priests in charge of about 201 parishes, besides many chaplaincies and mission- stations. The largest Catholic community is at Zürich (43,655). The 35 Capuchins of the prefectures Apostolic had charge of 79 chapels in 1906. Three Benedictine abbeys — Einsiedeln, Engelberg, and Disentis — are within the diocese and, with the church of Saint Nicholas of Flüe at Sachseln, are places of pilgrimage. There was an ecclesiastical seminary in Chur, besides colleges in Schwyz, Disentis, Einsiedeln, Engelberg, Sarnen, and Stans. The diocese include nine orders of men and ten orders of women (Franciscans, Augustinians, Dominicans, Benedictines, and others), as well as eleven congregations.

== Separation of the Principality of Liechtenstein from Chur ==
In 1997 the Archdiocese of Vaduz was erected by Pope John Paul II in the apostolic constitution Ad satius consulendum. Before then it had been the Liechtenstein Deanery of the Diocese of Chur. The former bishop of Chur, Wolfgang Haas has been the Archbishop of Vaduz since the founding of the archdiocese.

== List of bishops ==
The known bishops of the diocese are given in the following list. Either their years in office or death date is given after their names.

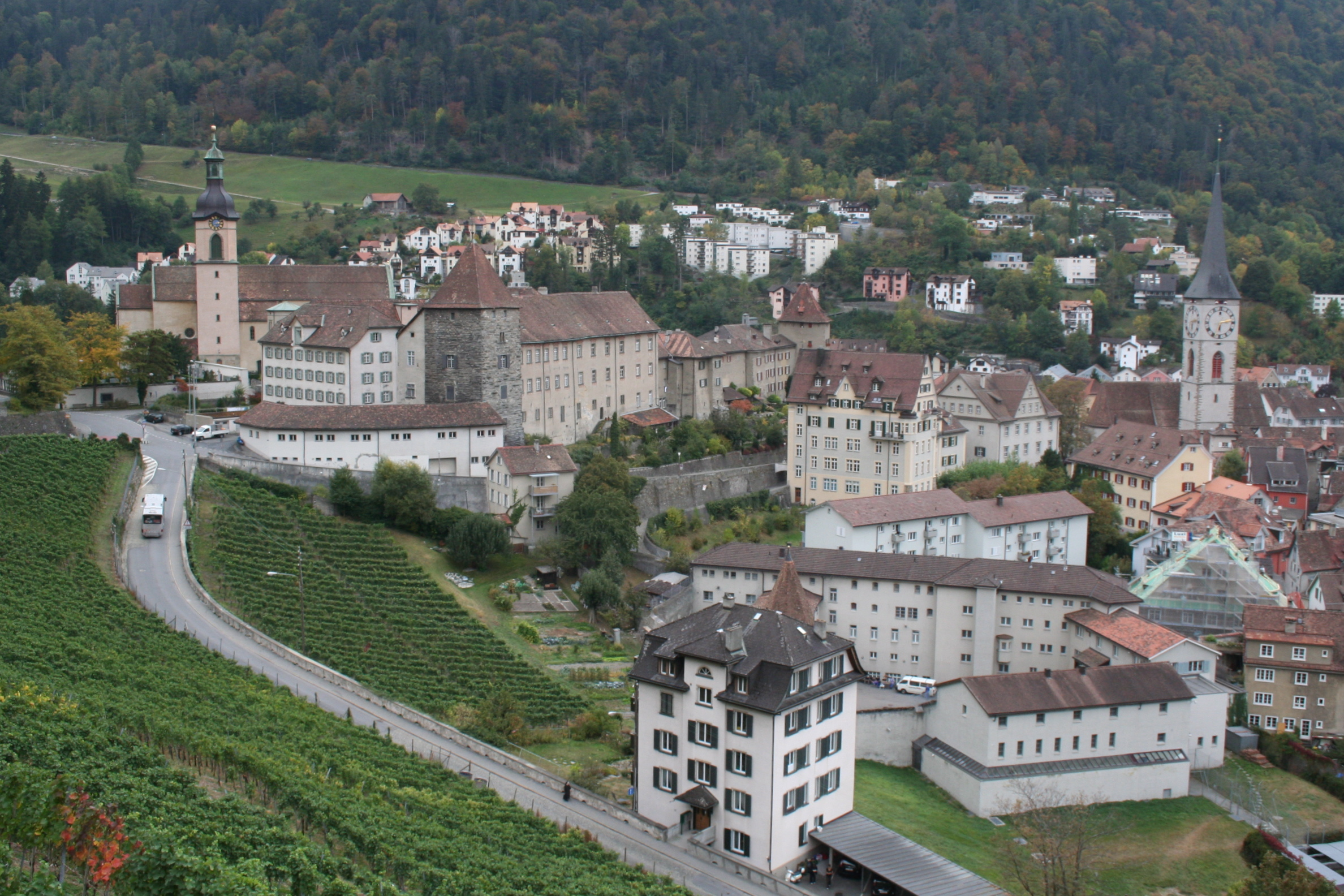
Left: The Episcopal Court at Chur

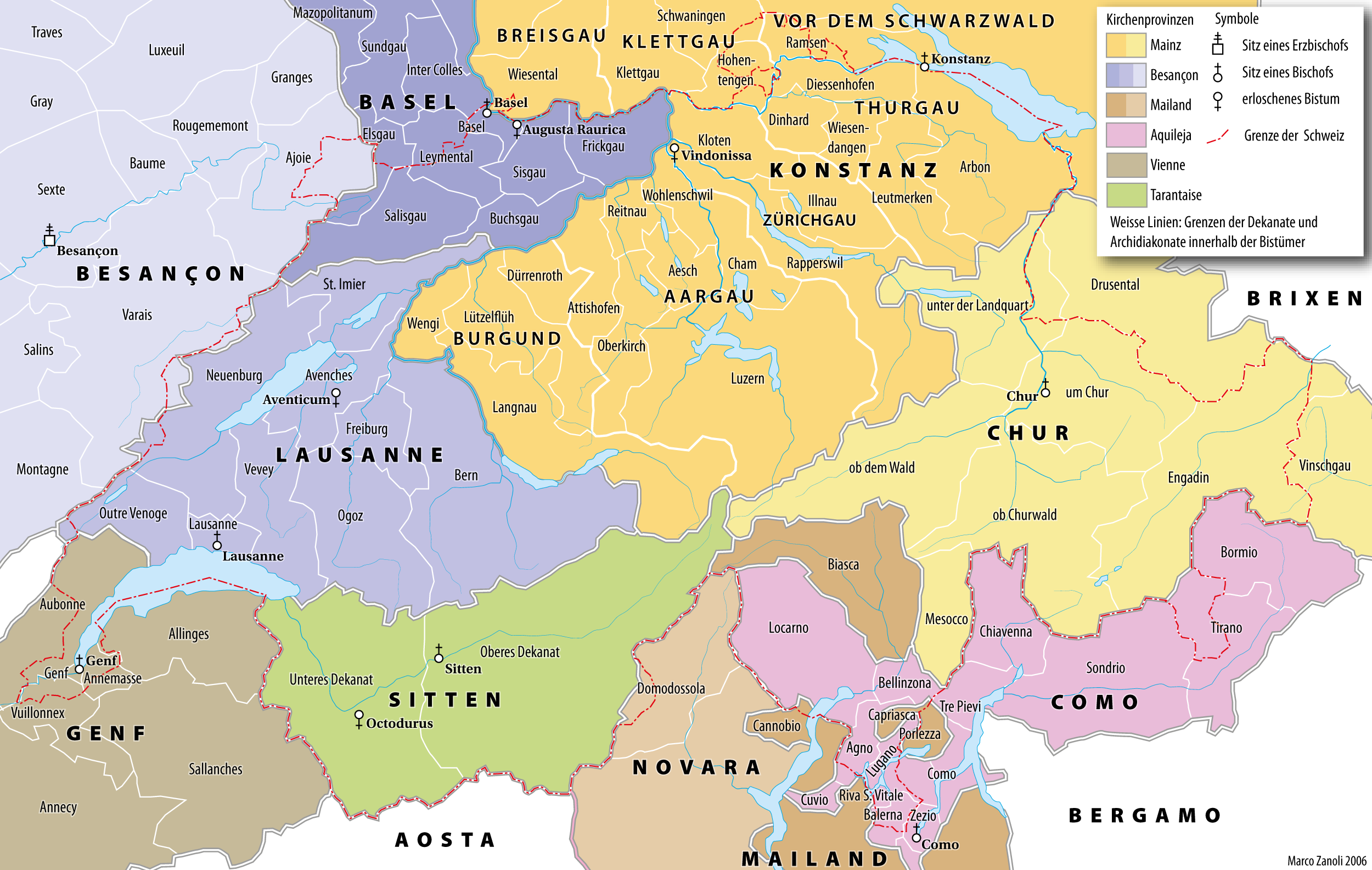
The historical bishoprics of Switzerland

1. Asinio (451)
2. Valentian (died 548)
3. Paulinus (548)
4. Theodor (599–603)
5. Viktor I (614)
6. Paschalis (Last third of 7th century)
7. Viktor II (Early 8th century)
8. Vigilius (First half 8th century)
9. Tello (759/60 – 765, began second cathedral)
10. Constantius (773/74)
11. Remedius (791/96 – 806)
12. Viktor III (822/23 – 831)
13. Verendar (836–843)
14. Esso (849–868)
15. Ruodhar (Rothar) (died before 888)
16. Diotolf (Theodolf) (888–913)
17. Waldo (920–940, died 949)
18. Hartbert (951–972)
19. Hiltibald (976–988)
20. Ulrich I (1006–1024)
21. Rupertus (Ruopert) (?)
22. Hartmann I (1030–1036, died 1039)
23. Dietmar von Montfort (1040–1061, died 1070)
24. Heinrich I von Montfort (1070–1078)
25. Norbert (1080–1087, died 1088)
26. Ulrich II von Tarasp (1087–1095)
27. Wido (1096–1122, first Prince-Bishop)
28. Konrad I von Biberegg (1123–1142)
29. Konrad II (1142–1150)
30. Adalgott (1151–1160)
31. Egino von Ehrenfels (1160–1168)
32. Ulrich III von Tegerfelden (1170–1179)
33. Bruno (1180)
34. Heinrich II von Arbon (1180, 1192)
35. Arnold I (1199)
36. Reinher della Torre (1194–1209)
37. Arnold II von Matsch (1209–1221)
38. Rudolf I von Güttingen, OSB (1224–1226)
39. Berthold von Helfenstein (1228–1233)
40. Ulrich IV von Kyburg (1233/34–1237)
41. Volkard von Neuburg (1237–1251)
42. Heinrich III von Montfort, OP (1251–1272, until 1268 only Bishop Elect)
43. Konrad III von Belmont (1273–1282, until 1278 only Bishop Elect)
44. Friedrich I von Montfort (1282–1290, until 1287 only Bishop Elect)
45. Berthold II von Heiligenberg (1291–1298 only Bishop Elect)
46. Siegfried von Gelnhausen (1298–1321)
47. Rudolf II von Montfort (1322, 1322–1325 administrator, Bishop of Constance 1322–1334)
48. Johannes I Pfefferhard (1325–1331)
49. Ulrich V (Ribi) von Lenzburg, OESA (1331–1355)
50. Peter I Wurst (Jelito) (1356–1368, also 1368–1371 Bishop of Leitomischl, 1371–1381 Archbishop of Magdeburg, 1381–1387 Bishop of Olomouc)
51. Friedrich II von Erdingen (1368–1376, appointed Bishop, also 1376–1396 Bishop of Brixen)
52. Johannes II (Ministri) von Ehingen (1376–1388, until 1377[?] only Bishop-elect)
53. Hartmann II von Werdenberg-Sargans (1388–1416, until 1412[?] only Bishop-elect)
54. Johannes III. Ambundii (1416–1418, also 1418–1424 Archbishop of Riga)
55. Johannes IV Naso (Naz) (1418–1440)
56. Konrad von Rechberg zu Hohenrechberg (1440–1441 administrator)
57. Heinrich IV Freiherr von Hewen (1441–1456 administrator, also 1436–1462 Bishop of Constance)
58. Antonio de Tosabeciis (1456 appointed Bishop)
59. Leonhard Wismair (1456–1458 only Bishop-elect)
60. Ortlieb von Brandis (1458–1491)
61. Heinrich V von Hewen (1491–1505)
62. Paul Ziegler (1505–1509 administrator)
63. Lucius Iter (1542–1549)
64. Thomas von Planta (1550–1565, possibly poisoned)
65. Beat à Porta (1565–1581)
66. Peter de Raschèr (1581–1601)
67. Johann V Flugi von Aspermont (1601–1627)
68. Joseph Mohr (1627–1635)
69. Johann VI Flugi von Aspermont (1636–1661)
70. Ulrich VI de Mont (1661–1692)
71. Ulrich VII von Federspiel (1692–1728)
72. Joseph Benedikt von Rost (1729–1754)
73. Johann Baptist Anton von Federspiel (1755–1777)
74. Johann Franz Dionys von Rost (1777–1793)
75. Karl Rudolf von Buol-Schauenstein (1794–1833, last Prince-Bishop, also 1824–1833 Bishop of St. Gallen)
76. Johann Georg Bossi (1835–1844, also 1835–1836 Bishop of St. Gallen)
77. Kaspar de Carl ab Hohenbalken (1844–1859)
78. Nikolaus Franz Florentini (1859–1876)
79. Kaspar Willi, OSB (1877–1879)
80. Franz Konstantin Rampa (1879–1888)
81. Johannes Fidelis Battaglia (1889–1908)
82. Georgius Schmid von Grüneck (1908–1932)
83. Laurenz Matthias Vincenz (1932–1941)
84. Christianus Caminada (1941–1962)
85. Johannes Vonderach (1962–1990)
86. Wolfgang Haas (1990–1997)
87. Amédée Grab, OSB (1998–2007)
88. Vitus Huonder (2007–2019)
89. Joseph Maria Bonnemain (2021–)

== See also ==
- Bishop of Chur
