= Marian Eleganti =

Swiss Catholic prelate (born 1955)

His Excellency, The Most Reverend Marian Eleganti OSB
- Auxiliary Bishop Emeritus of Chur
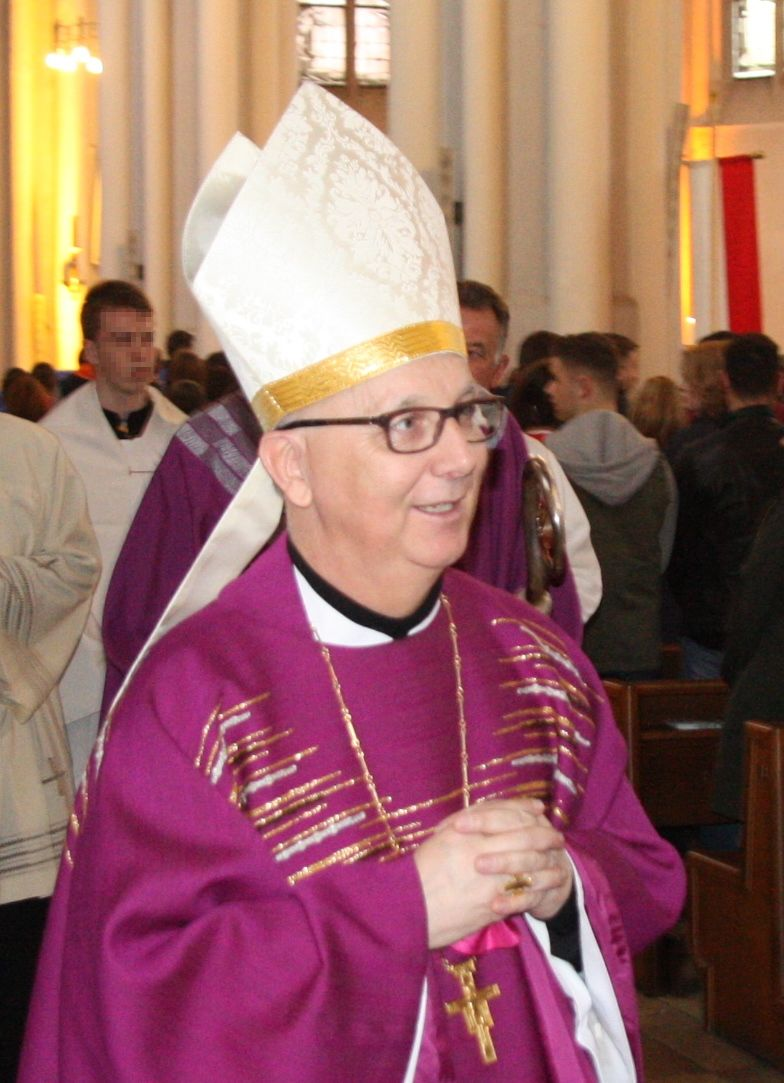
- Eleganti in 2014
- Church: Catholic Church
- Diocese: Chur
- Appointed: 7 December 2009
- Term ended: 15 February 2021
- Other posts: Titular Bishop of Lamdia (2009 - )
- Previous post: Abbot of St. Otmarsberg Abbey (1999-2009)

Orders
- Ordination: 23 June 1995 by Ivo Fürer
- Consecration: 31 January 2010 by Vitus Huonder, Francesco Canalini, Amédée Grab

Personal details
- Born: 7 April 1955 (age 71) Uznach, Switzerland
- Denomination: Roman Catholic
- Education: Pontifical Lateran University; University of Salzburg
- Motto: Cor ad cor loquitur (Heart speaks to heart)
- Coat of arms: Marian Eleganti's coat of arms

Styles of Marian Eleganti
- Reference style: His Excellency; The Most Reverend
- Spoken style: Your Excellency
- Religious style: Bishop

Ordination history of Marian Eleganti
History
Priestly ordination
- Ordained by: Ivo Fürer
- Date: 23 June 1995
Episcopal consecration
- Principal consecrator: Vitus Huonder
- Co-consecrators: Francesco Canalini, Amédée Grab
- Date: 31 January 2010
- Place: Chur Cathedral, Chur

Marian Eleganti OSB (born 7 April 1955) is a Swiss Catholic prelate who served as an auxiliary bishop of the Diocese of Chur from 2009 to 2021. From 1999 to 2009, Eleganti was Abbot of St. Otmarsberg Abbey. He is a member of the Benedictines.

== Life ==
Eugen Eleganti was born in Uznach, Canton of St. Gallen, on 7 April 1955, the second of four children to the contractor Eugen Eleganti and Irma Egli. He attended the Benedictine Einsiedeln seminary from 1967, where he completed his studies in 1974. He joined the Benedictines at the monastery of Einsiedeln in 1975, taking the name "David".

Later that year, Eleganti resigned from the monastery and joined a recently [1972] started group in Innsbruck, Austria, under the leadership of the Austrian priest Joseph Seidnitzer who had been gathering a community of young men and women geared towards the priesthood and the consecrated life. Eleganti continued his education, studying Catholic Theology at the Pontifical Lateran University. In 1978, alongside Gebhard Maria Sigl, he took over leadership duties for the above said community in Innsbruck, due to - as it turned out - the suspension 'a Divinis' of Fr. Seidnitzer. Eleganti left the community in 1990, entering the Abbey of the Missionary Benedictines in St. Otmarsberg in Uznach, where he assumed the religious name "Marian". In 1994 he finished his studies of theology in Salzburg. On 16 November 1994, Eleganti was ordained a Deacon by Bishop Otmar Mäder, and received his ordination on 23 June 1995 by the Bishop of St. Gallen, Ivo Fürer. In 2003, Eleganti completed a Doctorate of Theology at the University of Salzburg, on Romano Guardini's concept of truth.

== Abbot ==
On 15 July 1999, the monks of St. Otmarsberg Abbey elected Eleganti as the monastery's second abbot, succeeding Ivo Auf der Maur, receiving his Benediction by Bishop Ivo Fürer on 29 August 1999. The Missionary Benedictines in Uznach belong to the Benedictine Congregation of St. Ottilien near Munich with branches in Europe, East, West and South Africa, South America, Cuba and the United States, India, Korea, China, Kazakhstan and the Philippines.

== Auxiliary Bishop ==
On 7 December 2009, Pope Benedict XVI appointed Eleganti the titular bishop of Lamdia and auxiliary bishop in Chur. Eleganti received his episcopal ordination on 31 January 2010 by the Bishop of Chur, Vitus Huonder, in the Cathedral of St. Mary of the Assumption; the co-consecrators were the Apostolic Nuncio in Switzerland and Liechtenstein, Archbishop Francesco Canalini, and the emeritus Bishop of Chur, Amédée Grab.

On 1 February 2010, Eleganti became episcopal vicar in the regional general vicariate for the cantons of Zurich and Glarus, with responsibility for pastoral work, representation and administration. Succeeding Denis Theurillat, he represented German-speaking Switzerland at Ticino at the Swiss Bishops' Conference Youth bishop since 2011. He resigned from this position in early March 2018 due to disagreements with the other bishops of the Youth Synod Conference for the fall of 2018.

From 23 February 2011 to 1 July 2014, Eleganti succeeded Ernst Fuchs as rector of the St. Lucy Seminary in Chur. Since 7 April 2011, Eleganti has been the Episcopal Vicar for Religious and Monastic communities, for philosophical and theological training and for the training and development of pastors.

Eleganti is the Honorary Conventual Chaplain of the Order of Malta's Helvetic Association.

Pope Francis accepted his resignation as auxiliary bishop of Chur on 15 February 2021, at the age of 65.

== Positions ==
In 2009, Eleganti supported the minaret ban in Switzerland.

Concerning Mgr. Carlo Maria Viganò, he said that Francis' refusal “to say a single word [about the allegations against him] is the classic denial-non-denial.”

A traditionalist Roman Catholic, Mgr. Eleganti harshly criticized the Second Vatican Council and the Novus Ordo Missae.
