= Apostolic Prefecture of Rhaetia =

Former Latin Catholic jurisdiction in Switzerland

Prefecture Apostolic of Rhaetia Praefectura Apostolica Rhaetorum

Location
- Country: Switzerland
- Metropolitan: Immediately subject to the Holy See
- Population: Catholics: 7200 (in 1902)

Information
- Rite: Latin Rite

The Prefecture Apostolic of Rhaetia (Latin: Praefectura Apostolica Rhaetorum) was a Latin Church ecclesiastical jurisdiction or apostolic prefecture of the Catholic Church in what is now the Diocese of Chur, Switzerland.

== History ==
- 1621: Established as Apostolic Prefecture of Rhaetia, on territory split off from the Roman Catholic Diocese of Chur.
- 1921: Suppressed to Roman Catholic Diocese of Chur after 300 years of existence.

In 1902 the Prefecture Apostolic had 22 parishes, in three of which the majority of inhabitants spoke Italian; 52 churches and chapels; 40 schools for boys and girls; 7200 Catholics and 25 Capuchins.

== Ordinaries ==
all incumbents were missionary members of the Order of Friars Minor Capuchin (O.F.M.Cap)
Apostolic Prefects of Rhaetia

- Fr. Ignatius of Cosnigo, O.F.M.Cap. (1621 – 1645)
- Fr. Giovanni Giuseppe Santini, O.F.M.Cap. (Jan 2, 1905 – 1912)

== See also ==
- Catholic Church in Switzerland

== Sources and References ==
- Profile at Catholic Hierarchy
