= Peter Henrici =

Peter Henrici may refer to:

- Peter Henrici (Jesuit) (1928–2023), Swiss Jesuit prelate, Blondelian philosopher, and professor
- Peter Henrici (mathematician) (1923–1987), Swiss mathematician
