= Peter Henrici (Jesuit) =

Swiss Jesuit priest (1928–2023)

His Excellency Peter Henrici
- Auxiliary Bishop Emeritus of Chur
- Appointed: 4 March 1993
- Term ended: 5 February 2007
- Predecessor: —
- Successor: Marian Eleganti
- Other post: Titular Bishop of Absorus (1993–2023)

Orders
- Ordination: 23 July 1958
- Consecration: 31 May 1993 by Bernardin Gantin

Personal details
- Born: 31 March 1928 Zürich, Switzerland
- Died: 6 June 2023 (aged 95)

Peter Henrici (31 March 1928 – 6 June 2023) was a Swiss Jesuit prelate, Blondelian philosopher and professor (1960–1993) at the Pontifical Gregorian University. He was Auxiliary Bishop of Chur from 1993 to 2007.

== Biography ==
Born on 31 March, 1928, in Zürich, Henrici happens to be a cousin of the Catholic theologian Hans Urs von Balthasar. Henrici joined the Society of Jesus and made his first profession (first vows) in 1947. After studies in philology at the University of Zürich, he pursued further studies in philosophy and theology at different universities in Rome, Munich and Lyon. He was ordained as a priest in 1958, and, in 1965, he made his final religious profession as a Jesuit.

== Professor at the Gregorian University ==
From 1960 to 1993 Henrici taught History of Modern Western Philosophy at the Pontifical Gregorian University, Rome, where he also served as Dean of the Faculty of Philosophy up to his appointment as Auxiliary Bishop of Chur. He was one of the much sought after professors at the Gregorian. His occasional lecture courses were often given to classes that were packed to overflowing. In the 1990–91 'A Philosophical Discourse for Theology' in the Faculty of Theology, for example, he gave a thrilling overview of the contributions of philosophy to Christian theology beginning from the doctrine of analogy in Plato and coming down to Heidegger. Again, in the 1990 graduate seminar on 'Methods of Interpreting a Philosophical Text,' with a chapter from Blondel's L'Action (1893), he gave hands-on training in the methods of Internal and External Structure, Lexicology, Metaphorology, Internal and External Sources, Redaktionsgeschichte, Wirkungsgeschichte, and Deutungsgeschichte (self- and other-interpretation).

From 1993, he served as visiting professor at the Theologische Hochschule and honorary professor at the University of Zürich. In 2008 he was named honorary professor of the Theologische Hochschule.

== Auxiliary bishop of Chur ==
In 1993, Henrici was named Auxiliary Bishop in Chur (Switzerland) and Titular Bishop of Absorus. Henrici was one of the two auxiliary bishops appointed to Chur in an attempt by the Holy See to defuse the crisis caused by the conservative policies of Bishop Wolfgang Haas.

His resignation as Auxiliary Bishop was accepted by Pope Benedict XVI on 5 February 2007, on the grounds of age.

== Death ==
Henrici died on 6 June, 2023, at the age of 95.

== Publications ==
Henrici has numerous publications to his credit, among which Hegel und Blondel (1958), a reworking of his doctoral thesis; Aufbrüche christlichen Denkens (1978), as also many translations, among others of the works of Jean Danielou, Maurice Blondel, and Pierre Favre.

- Hegel und Blondel: Eine Untersuchung über Form und Sinn der Dialektik in der 'Phänomenologie des Geistes' und der ersten 'Action'. Pullach bei München: Berchmanskolleg, 1958.
- Introduzione alla metafisica: ad uso degli studenti. Rome: Editrice Pontificia Università Gregoriana, 1989.
- Guida pratica allo studio: con una bibliografia degli strumenti di lavoro per la Filosofia e la Teologia. 3rd rev. ed. Rome: Editrice Pontificia Università Gregoriana, 1992 (A Practical Guide to Study, tr. Ivo Coelho. Rome: Editrice Pontificia Università Gregoriana, 2004).
- Bibliografia 1956–1993. Rome: Editrice Pontificia Università Gregoriana, 1993.

Catholic Church titles
Preceded by —	Auxiliary Bishop of Chur; 1993–2007	Succeeded by Marian Eleganti
Preceded by Karl Moser	Titular Bishop of Absorus; 1993–2023	Succeeded by Vacant
