= Vitus Huonder =

Swiss Roman Catholic bishop (1942–2024)

His Excellency, The Most Reverend Vitus Huonder
- Bishop of Chur
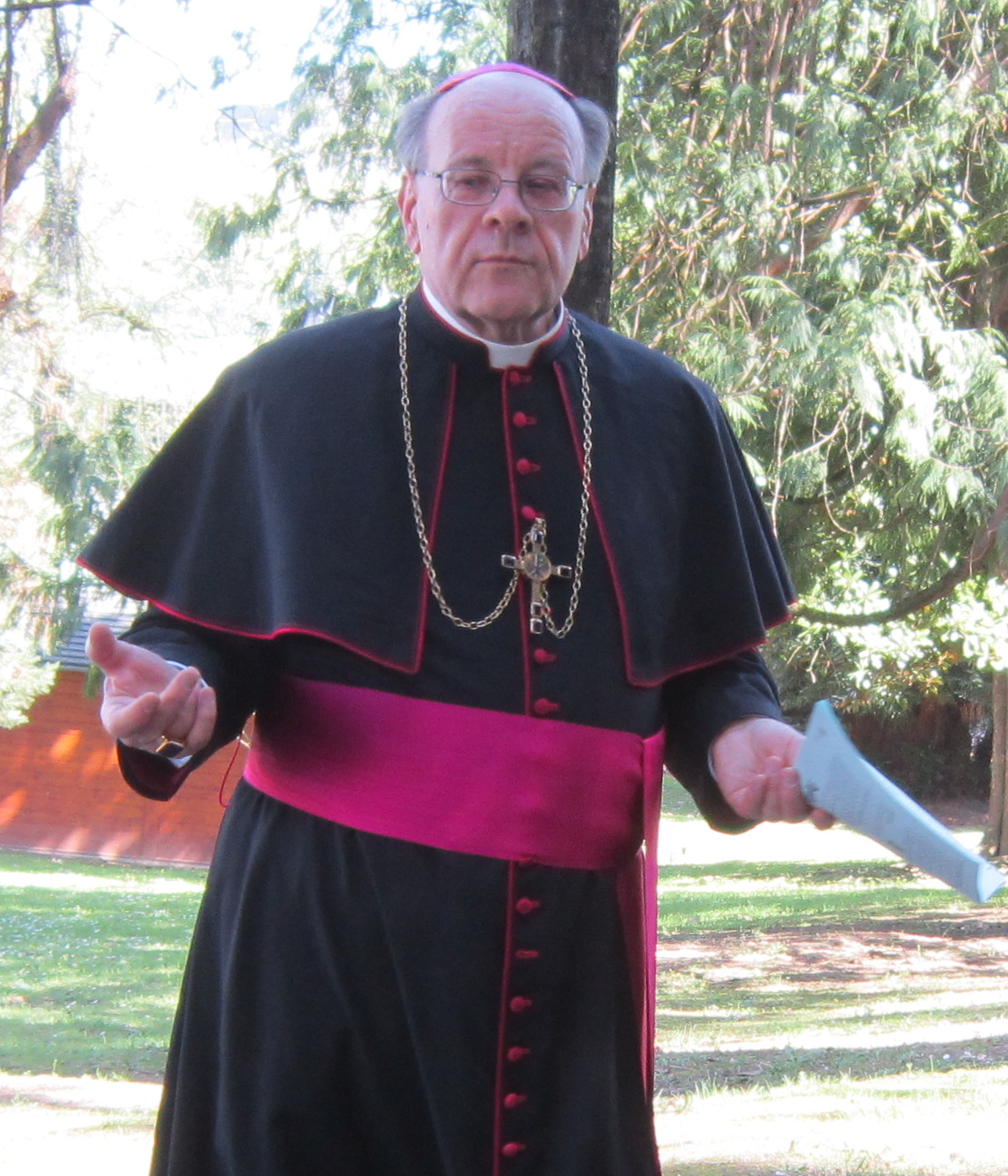
- Huonder, circa 2013
- Church: Catholic Church
- See: Chur
- Appointed: 8 July 2007
- Installed: 8 September 2007
- Term ended: 20 May 2019
- Predecessor: Amédée Grab
- Successor: Joseph Maria Bonnemain

Orders
- Ordination: 25 September 1971 by Johannes Anton Vonderach
- Consecration: 8 September 2007 by Amédée Grab, Francesco Canalini, Kurt Koch

Personal details
- Born: 21 April 1942 Trun, Switzerland
- Died: 3 April 2024 (aged 81) Wangs, Switzerland
- Buried: International Seminary of Saint Pius X, Écône, Valais, Switzerland
- Denomination: Roman Catholic
- Education: Pontifical Atheneum Saint Anselm, Rome, Italy; University of Fribourg, Fribourg, Switzerland
- Motto: Instaurare omnia in Christo (To restore all things in Christ)
- Coat of arms: Vitus Huonder's coat of arms

Styles of Vitus Huonder
- Reference style: His Excellency; The Most Reverend
- Spoken style: Your Excellency
- Religious style: Bishop

Ordination history of Vitus Huonder
History
Priestly ordination
- Ordained by: Johannes Vonderach
Episcopal consecration
- Principal consecrator: Amédée Grab
- Co-consecrators: Francesco Canalini, Kurt Koch
Episcopal succession
Bishops consecrated by Vitus Huonder as principal consecrator
- Marian Eleganti: 31 January 2010

Vitus Huonder (21 April 1942 – 3 April 2024) was a Swiss prelate of the Catholic Church. A Traditionalist Catholic, he served as Bishop of Chur from 2007 to 2019.

== Biography ==
Vitus Huonder was born in Trun on 21 April 1942. He studied at the Pontifical Atheneum Saint Anselm and at the University of Fribourg, earning a licentiate in theology. He was ordained a priest of the diocese of Chur on 25 September 1971 and then continued his studies, earning a doctorate in theology in Fribourg. He became vicar general of Chur in 1998.

Pope Benedict XVI appointed him bishop of Chur on 8 July 2007. He received his episcopal consecration on 8 September 2007 from Amédée Grab, his predecessor as bishop of Chur. His tenure proved controversial to some, due to his outspoken conservative views.

Pope Francis accepted his resignation on 20 May 2019. Huonder chose to live out his retirement in an institute of the Society of Saint Pius X, with papal authorization, with the intention of living a quiet and prayerful life, celebrating the Tridentine Mass, and working for the revitalization of Sacred Tradition, which he saw as the only means of restoration of the Church.

On 3 April 2024, Huonder died at the age of 81 in the Sancta Maria Institute in Wangs, following a serious illness. His funeral Mass on 17 April was celebrated by Bishop Bernard Fellay, and Huonder was buried at the International Seminary of Saint Pius X in Écône next to the tomb of Archbishop Marcel Lefebvre. Huonder's successor, Bishop Joseph Maria Bonnemain, attended the funeral, but did not take part in the celebration, due to the irregular canonical situation of the SSPX.

Catholic Church titles
Preceded by Amédée Grab	Bishop of Chur; 2007–2019	Succeeded by Joseph Maria Bonnemain
