= Bishop of Chur =

Bishop of the Catholic Church

Catholic
- Incumbent; Joseph Maria Bonnemain

Information
- First holder: Asinio
- Diocese: Chur
- Cathedral: Chur Cathedral

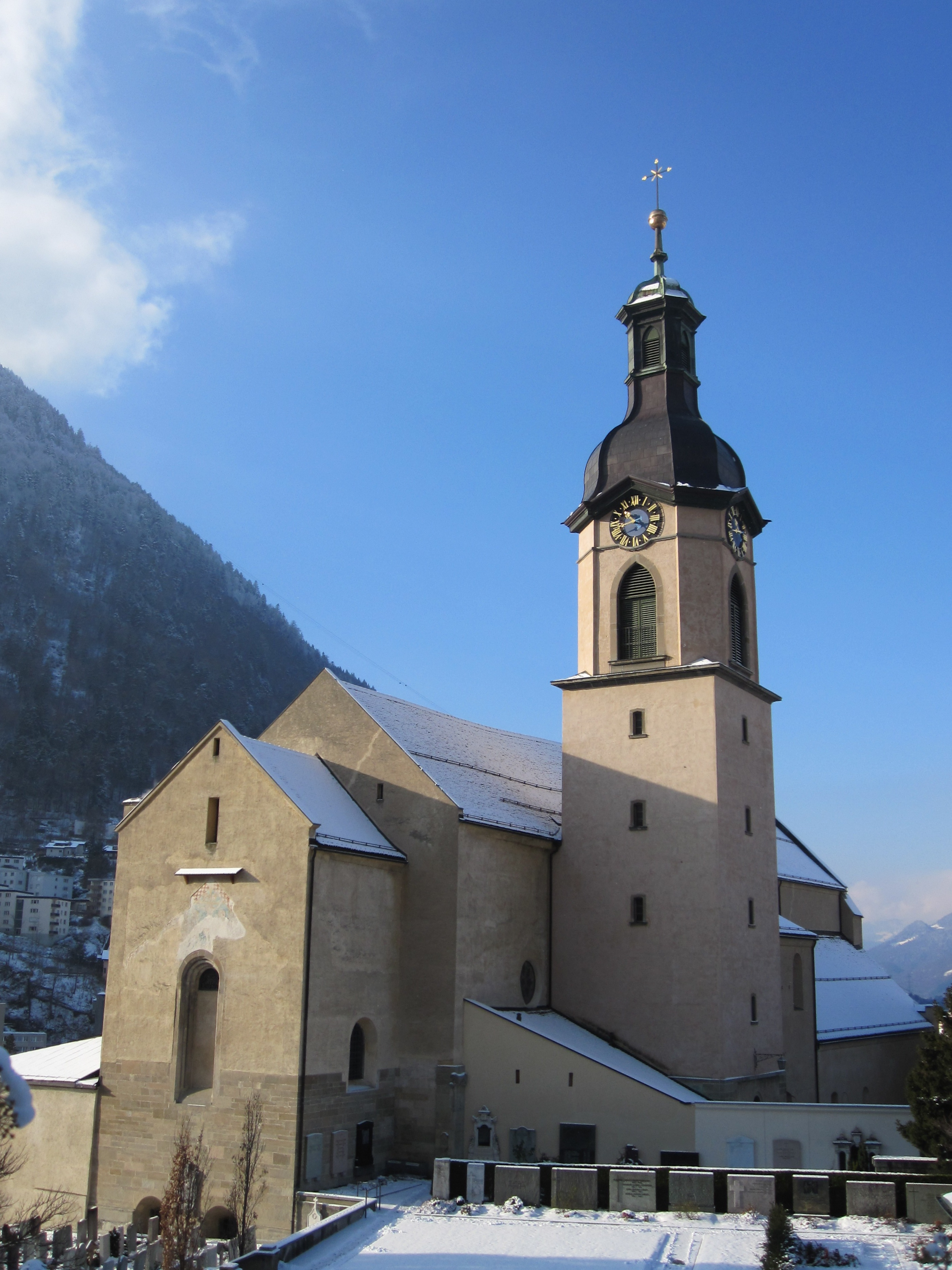
Chur Cathedral

The Bishop of Chur (German: Bischof von Chur) is the ordinary of the Diocese of Chur in Grisons, Switzerland (Latin: Dioecesis Curiensis).

== History ==
A Bishop of Chur is first mentioned in 451/452 when Asinius attended the Synod of Milan, but probably existed a century earlier. According to local tradition, the first Bishop of Chur was Saint Lucius, who is said to have died a martyr at Chur about the year 176, and whose relics are preserved in the cathedral. In the 7th century the bishopric acquired several territories south to the Lake of Constance. The see was at first suffragan to the archbishop of Milan, but after the treaty of Verdun (843) it became suffragan to Mainz. In 958 Holy Roman Emperor Otto I gave the bishopric to his vassal Hartpert with numerous privileges including control over the Septimer Pass, at the time the main pass through the central Alps. These concessions strengthened the bishopric's temporal power and later it became a princedom within the Holy Roman Empire.

At the time of the Hohenstaufen emperors in the 12th to early 13th centuries, some bishops of Chur were appointed by the emperor, which for a period led to existence of two bishops at the same time, the other being appointed by the pope. In the 14th century bishop Siegfried von Gelnhausen acquired the imperial diocese of Chur from the Barons Von Vaz and represented emperor Henry VII in Italy.

In 1803 the see became immediately subject to the Holy See. Until 1997, the Principality of Liechtenstein had been part of the diocese of Chur.

== List of Bishops of Chur ==
Term	Bishop	Notes
ca. 176	Lucius	
452-455	Asinio	
ca. 460	Pruritius	
ca. 470	Claudian	
ca. 485	Ursicinus I	
ca. 495	Sidonius	
ca. 520	Eddo	
530-546	Valentinianus	
548-?	Paulinus	
ca. 590	Theodore	
ca. 614	Victor I	
?	Verendarius ?	
?-681	Ruthard	
681-696	Paschal	
696?-712	Victor II	
712-735	Vigilius	
ca. 740	Adalbert	
754-760	Ursicinus II	
759-765	Tello	
773-800?	Constantius	
800-820	Remigius	
820-833	Victor III	
833-844	Verendarius	
844-849	Gerbrach	
849-879	Hesso	
879-887	Rothar	
887-914	Dietholf	
914-949	Waldo I	
949-968	Hartbert	
969-995	Hiltibold	
995-1002	Waldo II	
1002–1026	Ulrich I	
1026–1039	Hartmann I	
1039–1070	Dietmar	
1070–1078	Heinrich I	
1079–1088	Norbert	
1089–1095	Ulrich II von Tarasp	
1095–1122	Guido	
1122–1142	Konrad I von Biberegg	
1142–1150	Konrad II von Tegerfelden	
1150–1160	Adalgod	
1160–1170	Egino von Ehrenfels	
1170–1179	Ulrich III von Tegerfelden	
1179–1180	Bruno von Ehrenfels	
1180–1193	Heinrich II von Arbon	
1194?-1200	Arnold I von Matsch	
1200–1209	Rainier	
1209	Walter von Tegerfelden	
1209–1221	Arnold II von Matsch	
1221–1222	Heinrich III von Realta and/or Albrecht von Güttingen, Abbot of St. Gall	
1222–1226	Rudolf I von Güttingen	
1226–1233	Berthold Graf von Helfenstein	
1233–1237	Ulrich IV Graf von Kyburg	
1237–1251	Volkhard von Neuenburg	
1251–1272	Heinrich IV Graf von Montfort	
1272–1282	Konrad III von Belmont	
1282–1290	Friedrich I Graf von Montfort	
1290–1298	Berthold II Graf von Heiligenberg	
1298	Hugo Graf von Montfort	
1298–1321	Siegfried von Geilnhausen	
1321–1324	Rudolf II Graf von Montfort	
1324–1325	Hermann von Eichenbach	
1325–1331	Johann I von Pfefferhart	
1331–1355	Ulrich V von Lenzburg	
1355–1368	Peter Gelyto	
1368–1376	Friedrich II von Erdingen	
1376–1388	Johann II von Ehingen	
1388–1390	Bartholomew	
1390–1416	Hartmann II, Count of Werdenberg-Sargans	
1416–1417	Johann III Ambundi	
1417–1440	Johann IV Naso	
1440–1441	Konrad IV von Rechberg	
1441–1453	Heinrich V von Höwen	Bishop of Constance
1453–1458	Leonhard Wyssmayer	
1458–1491	Ortlieb von Brandis	
1491–1503	Heinrich VI von Höwen	
1503–1541	Paul Ziegler von Ziegelberg	
1541–1548	Licius Iter	
1548–1565	Thomas Planta	
1565–1581	Beatus à Porta	
1581–1601	Peter II von Rascher	
1601–1627	Giovanni V	
1627–1635	Joseph Mohr, von Zernez	
1636–1661	Giovanni VI Johann Flugi d'Apremont	
1661–1692	Ulrich VI di Monte-Villa	
1692–1728	Ulrich VII von Federspiel	
1728–1754	Joseph Benedict von Rost	
1755–1777	Johann Anton von Federspiel	
1777–1794	Franz Dionysius von Rost	
1794–1833	Karl Rudolf Graf von Buol-Schauenstein	last prince-bishop (until 1803)
1834–1844	Johann Georg Bossi	
1844–1859	Kaspar I de Carl ab Hohenbalken	
1859–1876	Nikolaus Franz Florentini	
1877–1879	Kaspar II Willi	
1879–1888	Franz Konstantin Rampa	
1888–1908	Johannes Fidelis Battaglia	
1908–1932	Georg Schmid von Grüneck	
1932–1941	Laurenz Matthias Vincenz	
1941–1962	Cristiano Caminada	
1962–1990	Johannes Vonderach	
1990–1997	Wolfgang Haas	
1997–2007	Amédée Grab	
2007–2019	Vitus Huonder	
2021-	Joseph Maria Bonnemain	
