= Victor I =

Victor I may refer to:

- Pope Victor I (reigned c. 189–199)
- Victor I (bishop of Chur)
- Victor I, Prince of Anhalt-Bernburg-Schaumburg-Hoym (1693–1772)
- Victor I, Duke of Ratibor (1818–1893)
- Victor Amadeus I, Duke of Savoy
- Victor Amadeus I, Prince of Carignano
- Victor Emmanuel I, King of Sardinia
- Victor class submarine, a nuclear-powered submarine built by the Soviet Union, the first version is referred to as Victor I
