= Chur Cathedral =

- Cathedral of the Assumption of Mary
- German: Kathedrale St. Mariä Himmelfahrt
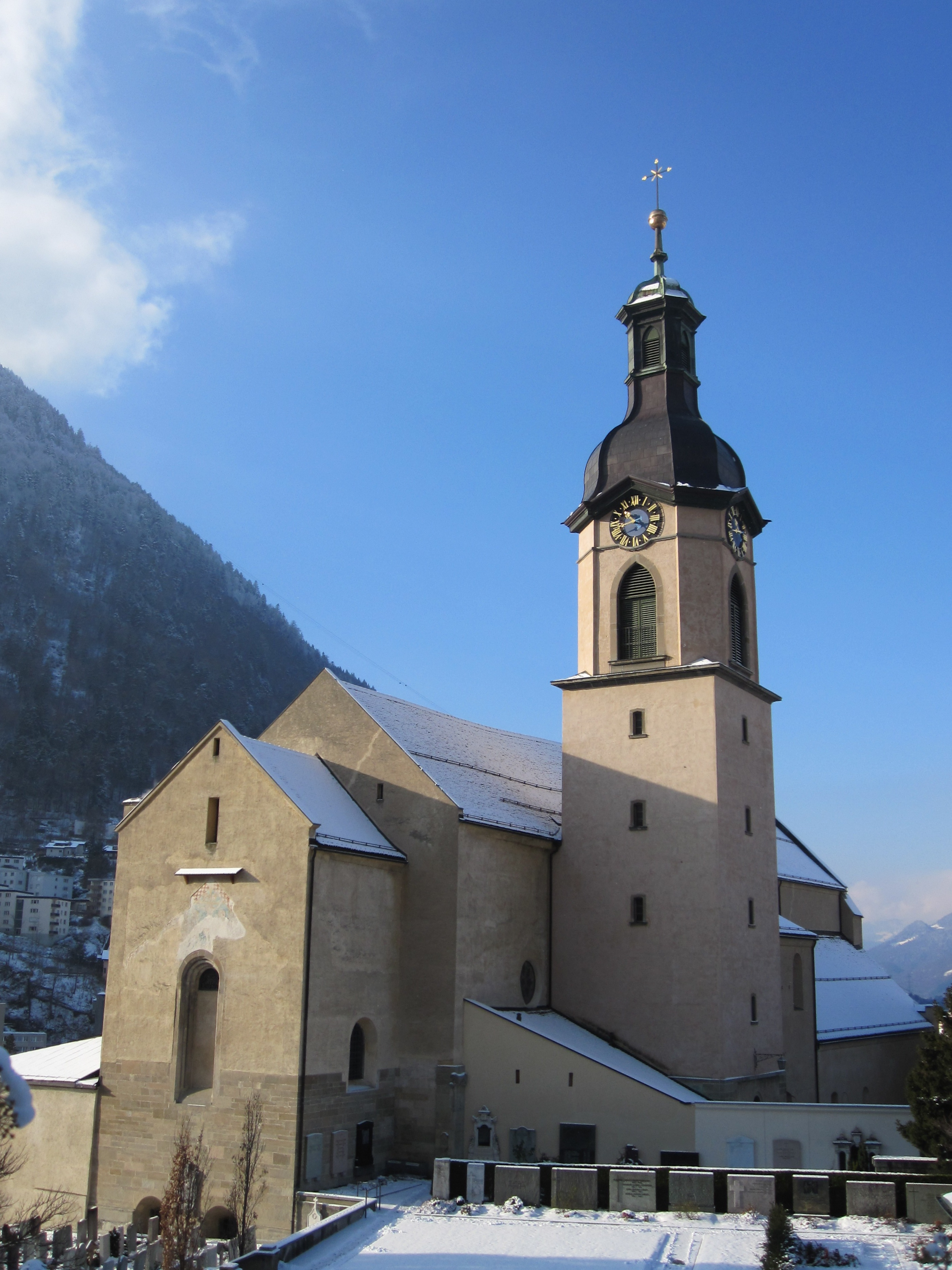

- Location within Canton of Graubünden Location within Switzerland
- 46°50′52″N 9°32′07″E
- Location: Chur
- Country: Switzerland
- Denomination: Catholic
- Website: www.bistum-chur.ch

History
- Status: Cathedral
- Founded: 1150

Architecture
- Functional status: Active
- Architectural type: Cathedral
- Style: Romanesque with Gothic elements
- Years built: 1150-1272

Administration
- Diocese: Chur

Clergy
- Bishop: Joseph Maria Bonnemain

Swiss Cultural Property of National Significance

Chur Cathedral, otherwise known as the Cathedral of the Assumption of Mary (German: Kathedrale St. Mariä Himmelfahrt), is the Catholic cathedral of the diocese of Chur in Switzerland. The episcopal palace of the bishop of Chur is beside the church. The cathedral claims the relics of St Lucius of Britain, said to have been martyred nearby in the late 2nd century. During the Swiss Reformation, the Catholic population of the city were confined to a ghetto enclosed around the bishop's court beside the cathedral. It is a Swiss heritage site of national significance.

The first building on the site probably dates from the first half of the 5th century. The second church was built by Bishop Tello at some time before his death in 773. The current building was built between 1154 and 1270. In 1272 it was dedicated to the Assumption of the Blessed Virgin Mary. The round arch window along the center axis is the largest medieval window in Graubünden. The late-Gothic high altar was completed in 1492 by Jakob Russ.

The cathedral was renovated from 2001 to 2007.

== History ==
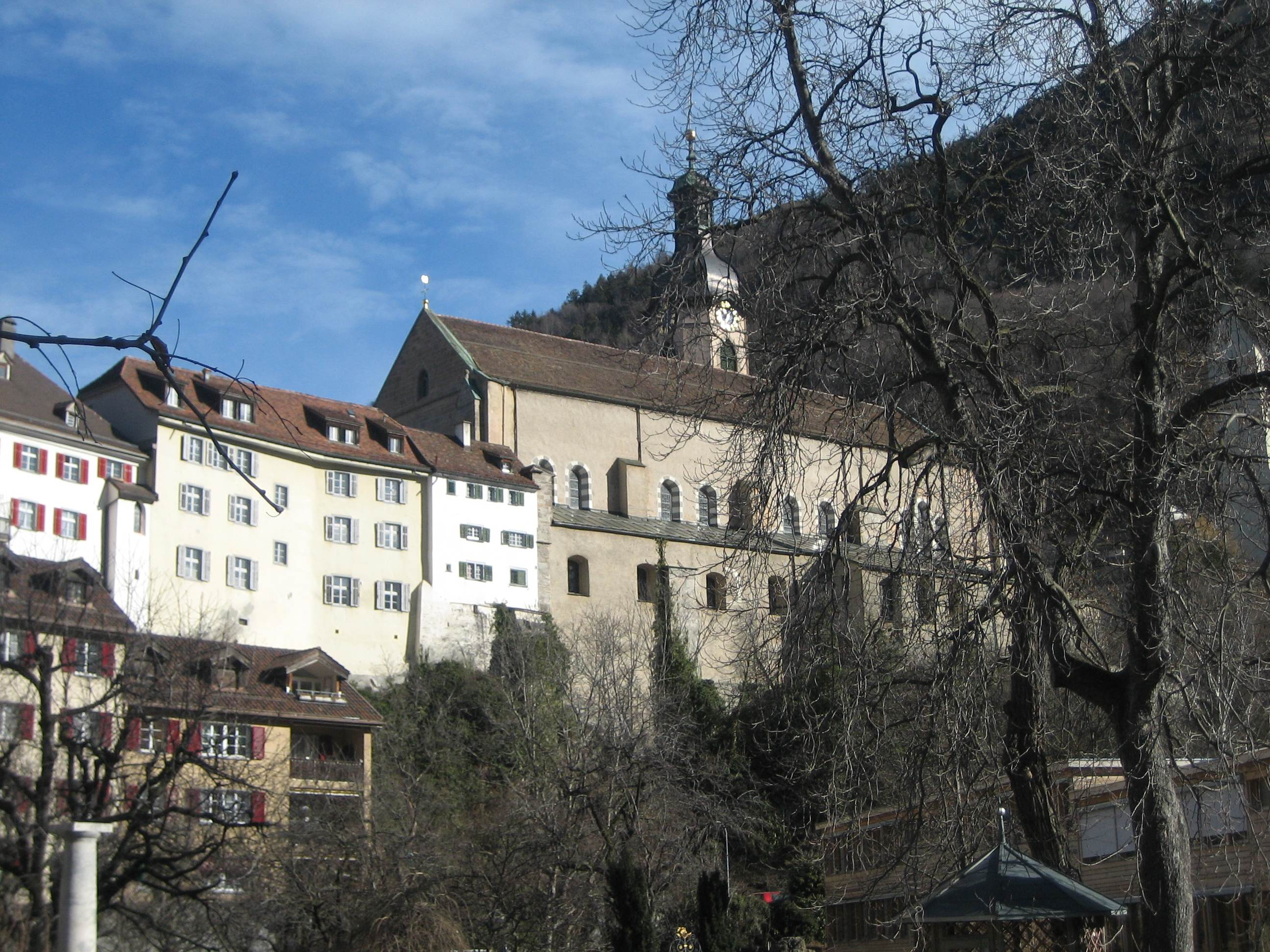
South side of the church and buildings of the Bishop's court

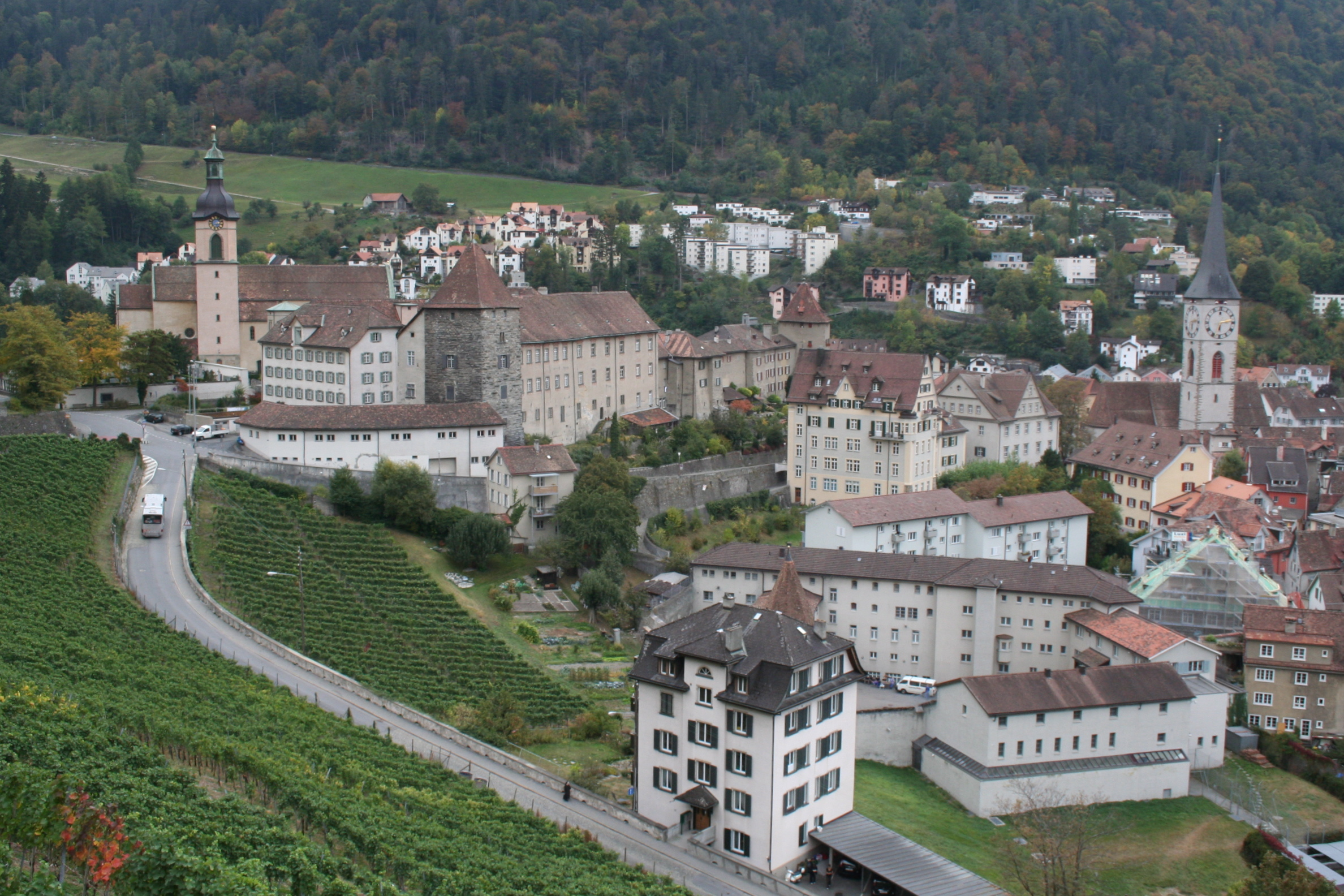
Left: The Cathedral and the Episcopal Court at Chur

Bishop Asinio of Chur was first mentioned in 451 with the diocese probably being founded in the 4th or 5th century. The first church on the site was built in the 5th century. In 1921 an excavation discovered a small apse from this first church below the current building. The second church was probably built by Bishop Tello before his death in 773. The 1921 excavation discovered a larger apse from this church. Additionally, some of the marble carvings in the choir are from this second church.

The current Romanesque church was begun under Bishop Adalgott (1151–60). The choir was consecrated in 1178, followed by the main altar in 1208. The church was completed and consecrated to the Assumption of the Blessed Virgin Mary in 1272 under Bishop Henry of Montfort. In 1462 the Chapel of S. Lawrence was added to the cathedral, followed by a sacrament house in 1484. A new high altar was built in 1492 by Jacob Russ. The St. Luzius Chapel and a prayer house for the bishop were built in 1517. The entire church was renovated in 1652. During the renovation, the upper sacristy was added.

Beginning in the 11th century, the Bishops of Chur began taking sides in secular conflicts as their worldly power grew. In 1079/80, during the Investiture Controversy the emperor's candidate Norbert became bishop over the pope's candidate Ulrich II of Tarasp. He held the office until 1087, when he was replaced by Ulrich II. During the conflicts between Frederick Barbarossa and Pope Alexander III following the 1159 papal election, Bishop Egino of Chur sided with the emperor and was rewarded with the dignity of Prince of the Empire (1170). In 1514 Emperor Maximilian I separated the land surrounding the cathedral from the town of Chur and granted it as an imperial estate to the Bishops. In 1524 the Protestant Reformation was accepted in Chur and the two Catholic churches of St. Martin and St. Regula were given over to the Protestants. The bishop fled, and his administrator, Abbot Theodore Schlegel, was publicly beheaded (1 January 1529). Bishop Thomas Planta, tried without success, to suppress Protestantism. He died, probably poisoned, 5 May 1565. The Ilanz Articles of 1524 restricted the secular power of the bishop to his imperial estate, including the cathedral. During the Bündner Wirren, the cathedral remained a center of Catholic power in the region. The 1803 Act of Mediation ended the secular power of the bishop.

In 1811 a fire destroyed the towers and roof of the cathedral. In 1828-29 the roof was replaced and the towers were rebuilt from the ground up. The marble floor in the choir was added in 1852. In 1884-86 the west window was reglazed and a new organ was built by F. Goll of Lucerne. Between 1921 and 1926 the entire church was completely renovated. The interior was completely cleaned, some of the plaster was removed from the walls, the altars were restored and the crypt floor was excavated. About a decade later, in 1937-38, another organ was added by Franz Gattringer of Horn in the Canton of Thurgau. For the rest of the 20th century a museum was added in the crypt and additional repairs, cleaning and renovations continued. For about six years, beginning in 2001, the cathedral was completely renovated and new organs replaced the Goll and Gattringer organs. The cathedral was re-consecrated on 7 October 2007.

== Cathedral exterior ==
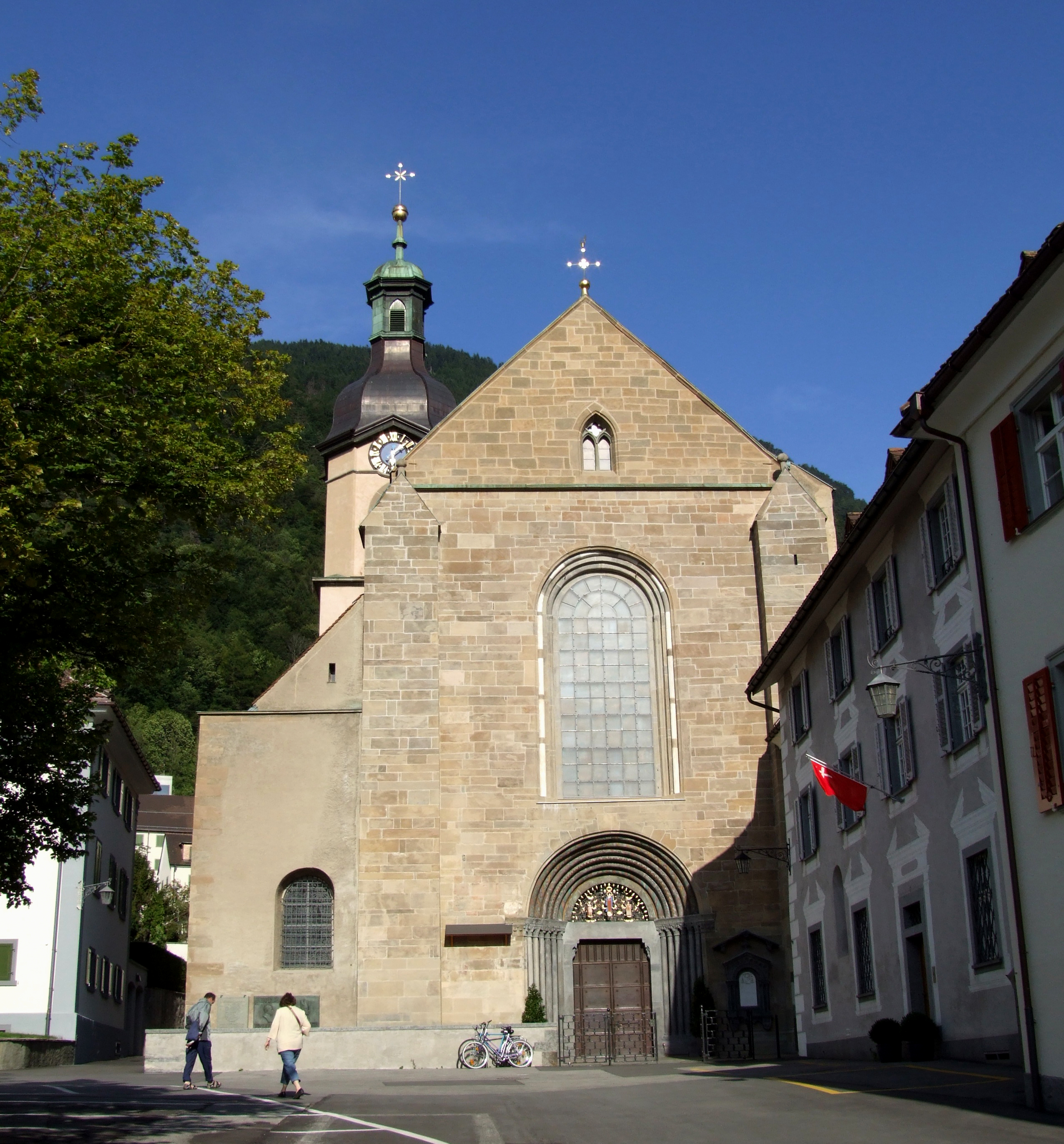
Westwork of the cathedral

The west facade of the cathedral consists of a Romanesque portal with the large west window above. The portal is flanked by two simple pilasters. The iron work above the portal was created around 1730. The single bell tower is on the north side of the building between the nave and choir. It was completely rebuilt by Johann Georg Landthaler after the 1811 fire. The two story sacristy makes up the east end of the building. A 14th century round window is visible on the north side of the choir, along with three windows on the south side which were restored in 1924-25.

== Organs ==
During the 2001-7 renovation two new organs were built in the cathedral. The main organ was the work of Kuhn Organ Builders of Männedorf in the Canton of Zurich. The choir organ was built by Späth Organ Builders of Rapperswil.

=== Main organ ===
The location and construction of the main organ was a little unusual. It was built on the floor of the nave instead of the more traditional location above the nave. Additionally, the two large organ towers stretch from the floor to support the gallery above. This placement allowed for a larger organ without blocking the light from the west window.

During the renovation the old 1887 Goll organ was dismantled and cleaned. Most of the registers, valves and wiring were in very poor condition and had to be replaced. However, 1132 of the original pipes were in good condition and were integrated into the new organ. The new organ has a total of 3,244 pipes including about one-third which came from the older organ. It is 11.63 m (38.2 ft) tall and weighs 15.2 tonnes (15.0 long tons; 16.8 short tons).

I Hauptwerk C–c^{4}
Principal	16′
Principal^{[b]}	8′
Gedeckt^{[a]}	8′
Flauto^{[a]}	8′
Gamba^{[a]}	8′
Octave^{[a]}	4′
Flöte^{[a]}	4′
Quinte	2 2/3′
Superoctave	2′
Mixtur V^{[b]}	2′
Cornett III–V^{[a]}	8′
Tuba	16′
Trompete	8′

II Positiv C–c^{4} (schwellbar)
Geigenprincipal^{[b]}	8′
Wienerflöte^{[a]}	8′
Salicional^{[a]}	8′
Octave	4′
Rohrflöte	4′
Sesquialtera II	2 2/3′
Flauto	2′
Mixtur IV	1 1/3′
Oboe^{[a]}	8′
Tremulant

III Schwellwerk C–c^{4}
Bourdon^{[a]}	16′
Diapason	8′
Gedeckt^{[a]}	8′
Dolce^{[a]}	8′
Vox caelestis^{[d]}	8′
Traversflöte^{[c]}	4′
Octavin	2′
Plein jeu V	2 2/3′
Basson	16′
Trompette harmonique	8′
Vox humana	8′
Tremulant

Pedal C–g^{1}
Principalbass^{[a]}	16′
Subbass^{[a]}	16′
Echobass^{[c]}	16′
Quinte	10 2/3′
Octavbass^{[a]}	8′
Violoncello^{[a]}	8′
Dolce^{[c]}	8′
Choralbass	4′
Bombarde^{[a]}	16′
Trompete	8′

Notes

- ^{a} Goll 1887 Organ
- ^{b} Goll 1887 Organ, register partly retained
- ^{c} Goll 1887 Organ, wooden
- ^{d} Gattringer 1938
- ^{e} Transmission through Swell box
- Couplers: II-I, III-I, I-P, II-P, III-P
- Super Octave Couplers: III-I, III-P

=== Choir organ ===
The choir organ is located on the south wall in the choir of the cathedral. It was rebuilt by Späth Orgelbau AG of Rapperswil during the renovation. It has eight registers which are distributed over two manuals and pedals, but has two preliminaries and a transmission which provide the impression of an eleven-register organ. The instrument is equipped with a tremulant, which affects the sound of the entire organ.

I Manual C–f^{3}
Principal	8′
Rohrgedeckt	8′
Octave	4′
Doublette	2′
Mixtur III

II Manual C–f^{3}
Gedeckt	8′
Spitzflöte	4′
Flautino	2′
Cornettino III	2 2/3′
Tremulant

Pedal C–f^{1}
Subbass	16′
Oktavbass	8′

- Couplers: II/I, I/P, II/P

== Bells ==
The current bells were built between 1821 and 1977.

. No	Name (function)	Cast Year	Foundry, casting site	Diameter mm, (ft in)	Mass kg, approx. (lb approx.)	Strike note (Semitone - ^{1} / _{16})
1	St. Luzius and Martha	1822	Jakob Grassmayr, Feldkirch	1,865 mm (6 ft 1.4 in)	3,892 kg (8,580 lb)	as^{0} +4
2	Karl Borromäus, Flurinus, Beatus	1822	Jakob Grassmayr, Feldkirch	1,468 mm (4 ft 9.8 in)	1,898 kg (4,184 lb)	c^{1} +1
3	Agatha, Angelus	1822	Jakob Grassmayr, Feldkirch	1,192 mm (3 ft 10.9 in)	1,016 kg (2,240 lb)	es^{1} +4
4	Marien	1977	Rüetschi AG, Aarau	1,151 mm (3 ft 9.3 in)	914 kg (2,015 lb)	f^{1} +4
5	Rosenkranz (Plague Bell)	1821	Jakob Grassmayr, Feldkirch	945 mm (3 ft 1.2 in)	506 kg (1,116 lb)	as^{1} +6
6	Georg (Lord's Bell)	1821	Jakob Grassmayr, Feldkirch	744 mm (2 ft 5.3 in)	247 kg (545 lb)	c^{2} +4
