= Victorids =

Family

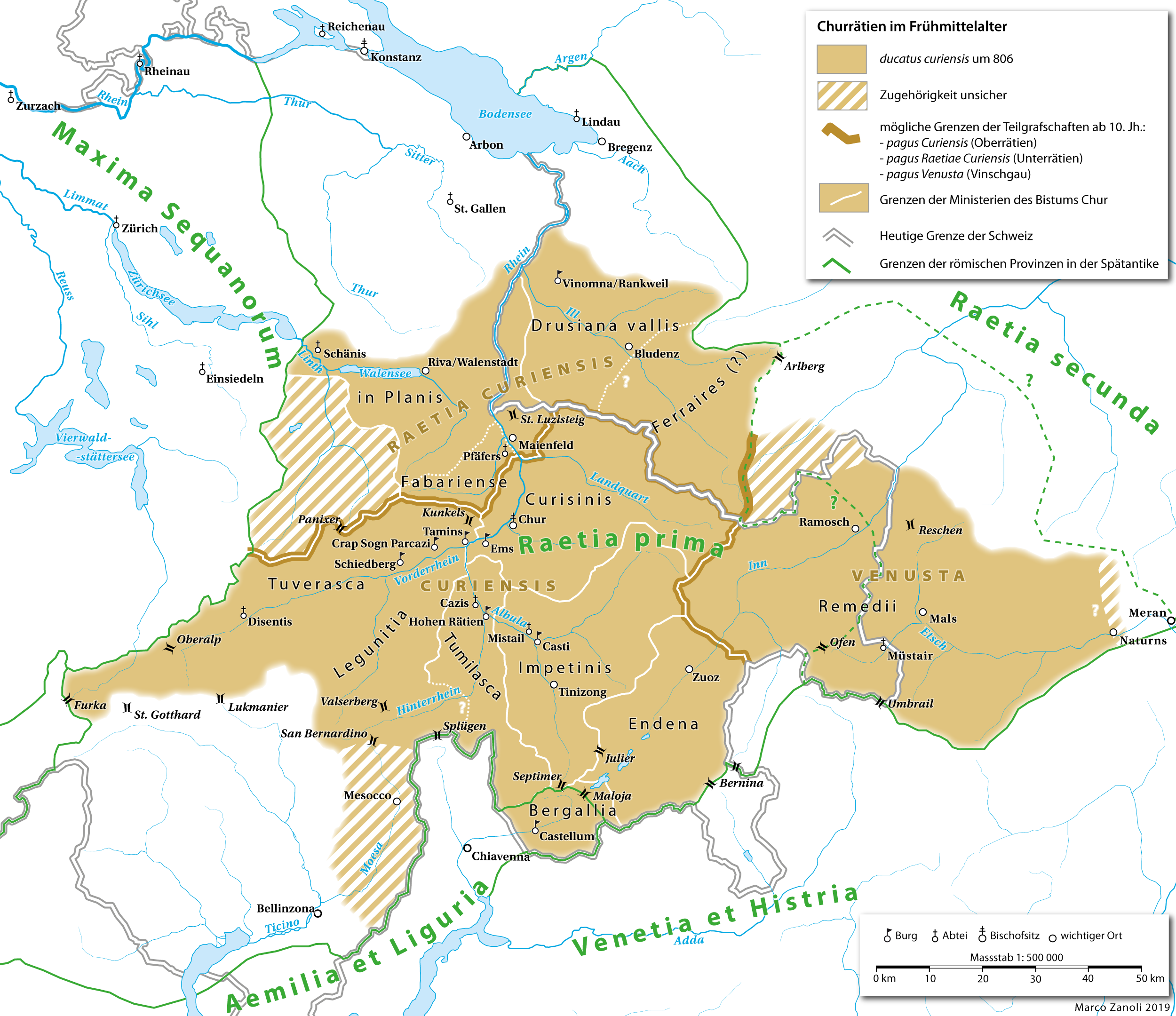
The ducatus Curiensis (or duchy of Chur) corresponded more or less with the diocese of the same name (dioecesis Curiensis). This was the region which the Victorids dominated.

The Victorids (Romansh: Zaccons) were a powerful family in Rhaetia during the seventh and eighth centuries, dominating the region politically and controlling the Diocese of Chur. The family is termed after the continued use of the name Victor.

Rhaetia was a part of the Frankish Empire from the sixth century at least. It was governed along Roman lines. The ecclesiastical province of Rhaetia was attached to the Archdiocese of Milan, but beginning c. 600 the influence of the Frankish church increased. In the province the secular and ecclesiastic powers were consolidated in the hands of one family, that of the Victorids, who had ties to the Merovingian dynasty in Gaul. The Victorids came to hold the offices of bishop and praeses (the highest judicial function, a Roman title).

The founder of the family was Zacco, who was granted military command of the region by the Frankish king and probably held the office of dux (duke). The first Victorid duke was Victor I, who moved away from the Archdiocese of Milan and towards the Frankish church. The Victorids were thus able to control the old Roman imperial fiscal lands, the ecclesiastic properties, and the military resources of the region. Under Zacco's successors the offices of duke and praeses were united and eventually the episcopal title was accepted as well.

The Victorids had their hand in the foundation of Pfäfers Abbey (Romansh: Faveras) (c. 730) and the monks of Pfäfers probably contributed to the foundation of Müstair (Tuberis). The Victorid bishop was Tello (758–763), who began the construction of the cathedral which has an unusual crypt and was renovated in the Romanesque style. Under the Carolingians the power of the Victorids diminished and they were replaced. The last Victorid bishop was Victor III (died c. 836), who fought against the secular forces seeking to take back power and property from the diocese, but ultimately failed.

== Sources ==
- Schmidhauser, John R. "The European Origins of Legal Imperialism and Its Legacy in Legal Education in Former Colonial Regions." International Political Science Review, Vol. 18, No. 3, Contrasting Political Institutions. Institutions politiques contrastées. (July 1997), pp 337–351.
- "Istorgia ecclesiastica dal Grischun." Lexicon istoric retic.
