= Victor II (bishop of Chur) =

Victor II was an 8th-century bishop of Chur of the Victorid family which had controlled the bishopric and the province of Rhaetia since the early seventh century.

He is mentioned in an inscription on the tomb of his predecessor Paschal in the monastery of Cazis. According to the Liber de feodis of 1388, he was a son of the tribune Vigilius and a woman named Episcopina. The date of his death was 21 November, but the date is unrecorded, probably in the first half of the eighth century.

== Sources ==
- Erich Wenneker (1997). "Victor II (bishop of Chur)". In Bautz, Traugott (ed.). Biographisch-Bibliographisches Kirchenlexikon (BBKL) (in German). Vol. 12. Herzberg: Bautz. cols. 1345–1346. ISBN 3-88309-068-9.
