= Adalgott =

Two medieval abbots of Disentis Abbey venerated as saints

There were two abbots of Disentis Abbey named Adalgott, both venerated as Catholic saints. They are sometimes confused in later historical writing, despite living approximately 130 years apart.

== Adalgott I ==
Saint Adalgott I of Disentis

Abbot of Disentis Abbey
- Died: 1 November 1031
- Major shrine: Disentis Abbey, Switzerland
- Feast: 26 October

Adalgott I (died 1 November 1031) was a Benedictine monk from Einsiedeln Abbey who became abbot of Disentis Abbey in 1012 or 1016. He was deeply committed to monastic reform and the elaboration of the liturgy. According to the Einsiedeln chronicler, who preserved a verse epitaph in his honour, Adalgott I was acclaimed as a saint immediately after his death. In 1672, his relics, along with those of Adalgott II, were enshrined in a newly built church at the abbey.

His feast day is celebrated on 26 October.

== Adalgott II ==
Saint Adalgott II of Disentis
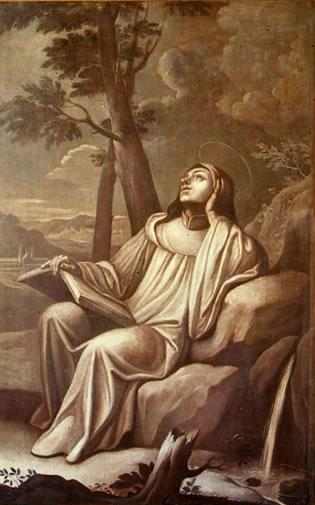
- Saint Adalgott as a Contemplative

Abbot of Disentis Abbey and Bishop of Chur
- Born: c. 12th century
- Died: 3 October 1160 or 1165
- Major shrine: Disentis Abbey, Switzerland
- Feast: 3 October

Adalgott II (died 3 October 1160 or 1165) was a twelfth-century Cistercian monk, abbot, and Bishop of Chur, venerated as a Roman Catholic saint.

=== Early life and monastic formation ===
Little is known about Adalgott II's origins or birthplace. He entered Clairvaux Abbey, where he came under the spiritual direction of Bernard of Clairvaux.Under Bernard's guidance, he received a thorough formation in Cistercian spirituality, theology, and the Rule of Saint Benedict.

=== Abbot of Disentis ===
Adalgott was subsequently appointed abbot of Disentis Abbey in Switzerland, situated on the Lukmanier Pass. As abbot, he became widely known for his care of the sick and poor.

=== Bishop of Chur ===
Adalgott was later named Bishop of Chur, the oldest diocese in Switzerland. In 1150 he founded a hospital, one of his most enduring practical legacies. He used his position and title to advocate on behalf of the suffering and disadvantaged throughout his tenure. He was a figure of some importance in the political affairs of the time, being associated with Emperor Frederick Barbarossa, the prince-bishop of Constance, and Pope Stephen III, whose fellow student he had reportedly been. He also appears to have been a benefactor of other religious houses, including those at Münster and Schännis, where his memory was later commemorated.

He died on 3 October, variously reported as 1160 or 1165, at or near Disentis Abbey. He was buried at Chur, though the exact location of his grave, likely within the cathedral whose reconstruction he had promoted, is unknown. Since 1646, the Diocese of Chur has venerated him liturgically as a saint; his name also appears in the Cistercian calendar of saints.

His feast day is celebrated on 3 October.

== Confusion between the two Adalgatts ==
The two abbots have frequently been confused in later historical writing, partly because both were associated with Disentis Abbey and both were venerated as saints. A German-language account notes that the confusion persists despite roughly 130 years separating the two men. Their relics were enshrined together in the abbey church at Disentis in 1672.

== See also ==
Disentis Abbey Clairvaux Abbey Einsiedeln Abbey Bishop of Chur List of Catholic saints
