= Karl Rudolf Graf von Buol-Schauenstein =

- Bishop of Chur
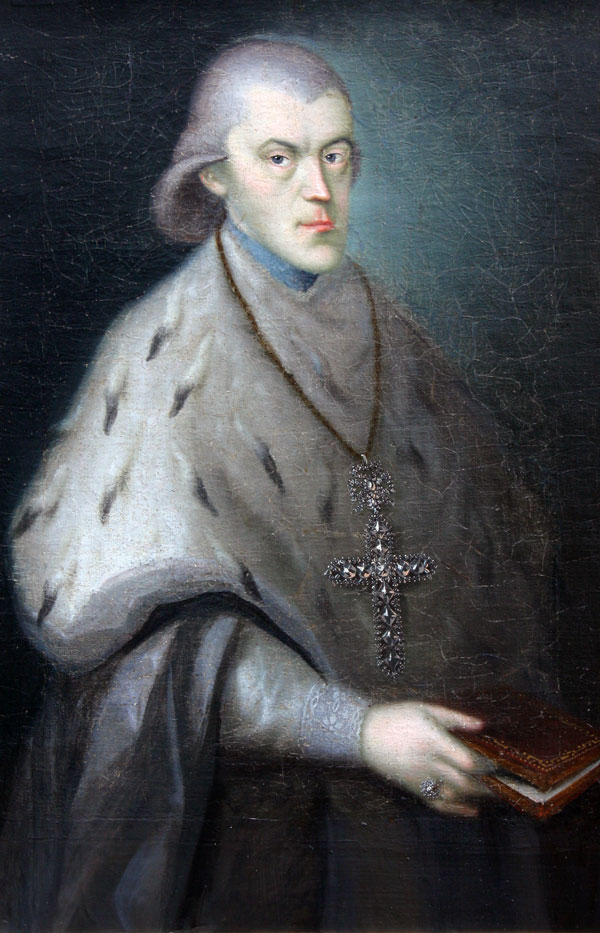
- Elected: 22 January 1794

Orders
- Consecration: 5 October 1794

Personal details
- Born: 30 June 1760
- Died: 23 October 1833 (aged 73)

Karl Rudolf Graf von Buol-Schauenstein (30 June 1760 – 23 October 1833) was Bishop of Chur (1794–1824), then of Chur-St. Gallen (1824-1833). He had also been the last prince-bishop of the Prince-Bishopric of Chur until the ecclesiastical principality was secularized in 1803 in the course of the German mediatization.

An uncle of the Austrian diplomat Karl Ferdinand Graf von Buol-Schauenstein, Buol-Schauenstein was first ordained as a priest at Chur on 14 June 1783. He was elected prince-bishop on 22 January 1794; his confirmation followed on 12 September 1794, and he was consecrated as such on 5 October 1794. In 1810, Buol joined the Order of Knights of Malta. Buol was appointed bishop of the combined diocese of Chur-St. Gallen on 27 September 1824 and served in this capacity until his death.
