= Georg Schmid von Grüneck =

Swiss Catholic bishop (1851–1932)

- Bishop of Chur
- Church: Catholic Church
- Diocese: Diocese of Chur
- Installed: 1908

Orders
- Ordination: 1875
- Consecration: 1908

Personal details
- Born: 21 November 1851 Sumvitg, Grisons, Switzerland
- Died: 6 May 1932 (aged 80) Chur, Grisons, Switzerland
- Parents: Martial Anton Modest Schmid von Grüneck; Maria Magdalene Carolina Crufer

Georg Schmid von Grüneck (21 November 1851 – 6 May 1932) was a Swiss Catholic bishop. After teaching at the seminary in Chur and serving as chancellor and vicar general of the diocese, he was elected and consecrated bishop of Chur in 1908. Under Pope Benedict XV he was brought into Vatican diplomacy and took part in the papal peace initiative of 1917. In the Modernist controversy he strictly followed the Roman line.

== Biography ==
Georg Schmid von Grüneck was born on 21 November 1851 in Sumvitg, (Note: Sources disagree: the HDS and the Historisches Lexikon des Fürstentums Liechtenstein give 21 November 1851 in Sumvitg, while the authority file of the German National Library (GND) gives 29 November 1851 in Andiast.) the son of Martial Anton Modest Schmid von Grüneck, a major in the papal Swiss troops, and Maria Magdalene Carolina Crufer. He came from the Catholic branch of the Schmid von Grüneck family at Sumvitg.

Schmid von Grüneck studied theology in London, under the influence of Cardinal Henry Edward Manning, and in Chur. He was ordained in 1875, and in 1878 he obtained a doctorate in both laws (Dr. iur. utr.) in Rome. From 1880 to 1889 he was a professor at the seminary (Priesterseminar) in Chur, from 1889 to 1898 episcopal chancellor, and from 1898 to 1908 vicar general of the diocese and rector (Regens) of the seminary. In 1908 he was elected and consecrated bishop of Chur.

Widely traveled and a skilled linguist, Schmid von Grüneck was brought into Vatican diplomacy under Pope Benedict XV, and in the summer of 1917, during the First World War, he took part in the papal peace initiative. Among others, he had personal contacts with Archduke Franz Ferdinand of Habsburg and the German politician Matthias Erzberger. He had good skills in canon law and organization.

In the Modernist controversy Schmid von Grüneck strictly followed the Roman line, and in 1910, with Heinrich Federer, he intervened on the integralist side in the Catholic literary dispute (Literaturstreit). On the other hand, he also successfully defended in Rome his seminary rector Anton Gisler, the dogmatic theologian and later auxiliary bishop, when Gisler himself was suspected of modernism after the publication of his book Der Modernismus (1912). Schmid von Grüneck died in Chur on 6 May 1932.

== Bibliography ==
- Helvetia Sacra, I/1, 504
