= Prince-Bishopric of Chur =

Ecclesiastical principality of the Holy Roman Empire

Prince-Bishopric of Chur Bistum Chur (de) Chapitel catedral da Cuira (rm) Principato vescovile di Coira (it)
- 1170–1803
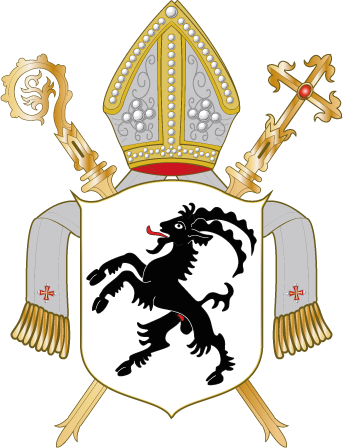
- Flag Coat of arms
- Capital: Chur
- Religion: Roman Catholic
- Government: Prince-Bishopric
- Bishop
- Historical era: Medieval
  - Established: 1170
  - Disestablished: 1803
Preceded by	Succeeded by
Raetia Curiensis	Three Leagues

The Prince-Bishopric of Chur (German: Hochstift Chur, Fürstbistum Chur, Bistum Chur) was an ecclesiastical principality of the Holy Roman Empire, and had Imperial immediacy. The Prince-Bishopric of Chur controlled contiguous land from the city of Chur, to Engadin, and to Vinschgau. The historical State must be distinguished from the Roman Catholic Diocese of Chur which still exists, even if the bishop was the same man.

They were led by the League of God's House from the 15th century. The Three Leagues then took over any effective power from the Prince-Bishopric (while in Vinschgau the control passed to the Habsburg), and after the Reformation the bishop's estates remained the sole territory of the principality. The bishop had the vote number 51 in the Imperial Diet.

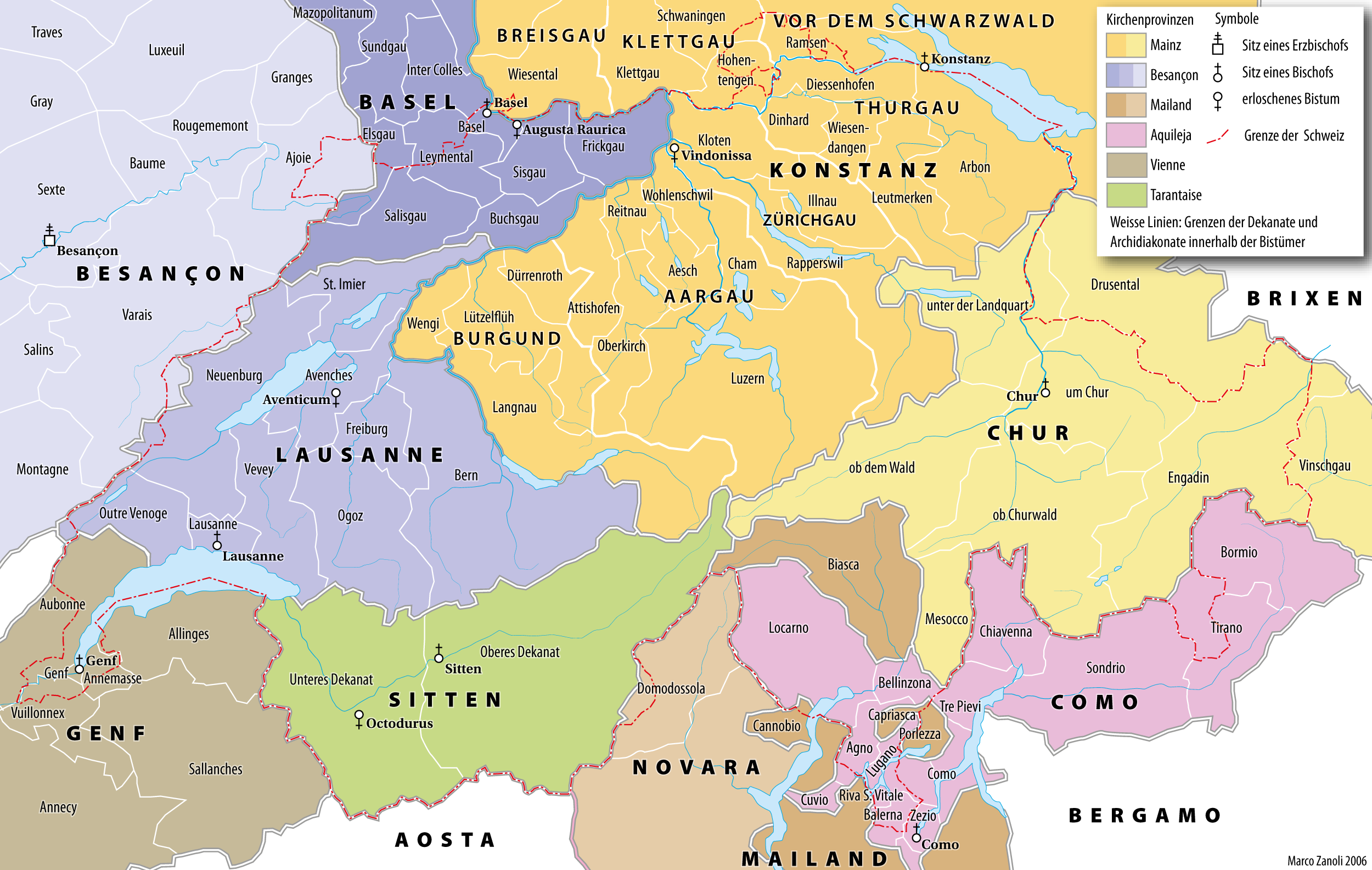
The historical Prince-Bishopric of Chur in Switzerland (light yellow)

The present-day Roman Catholic Diocese of Chur

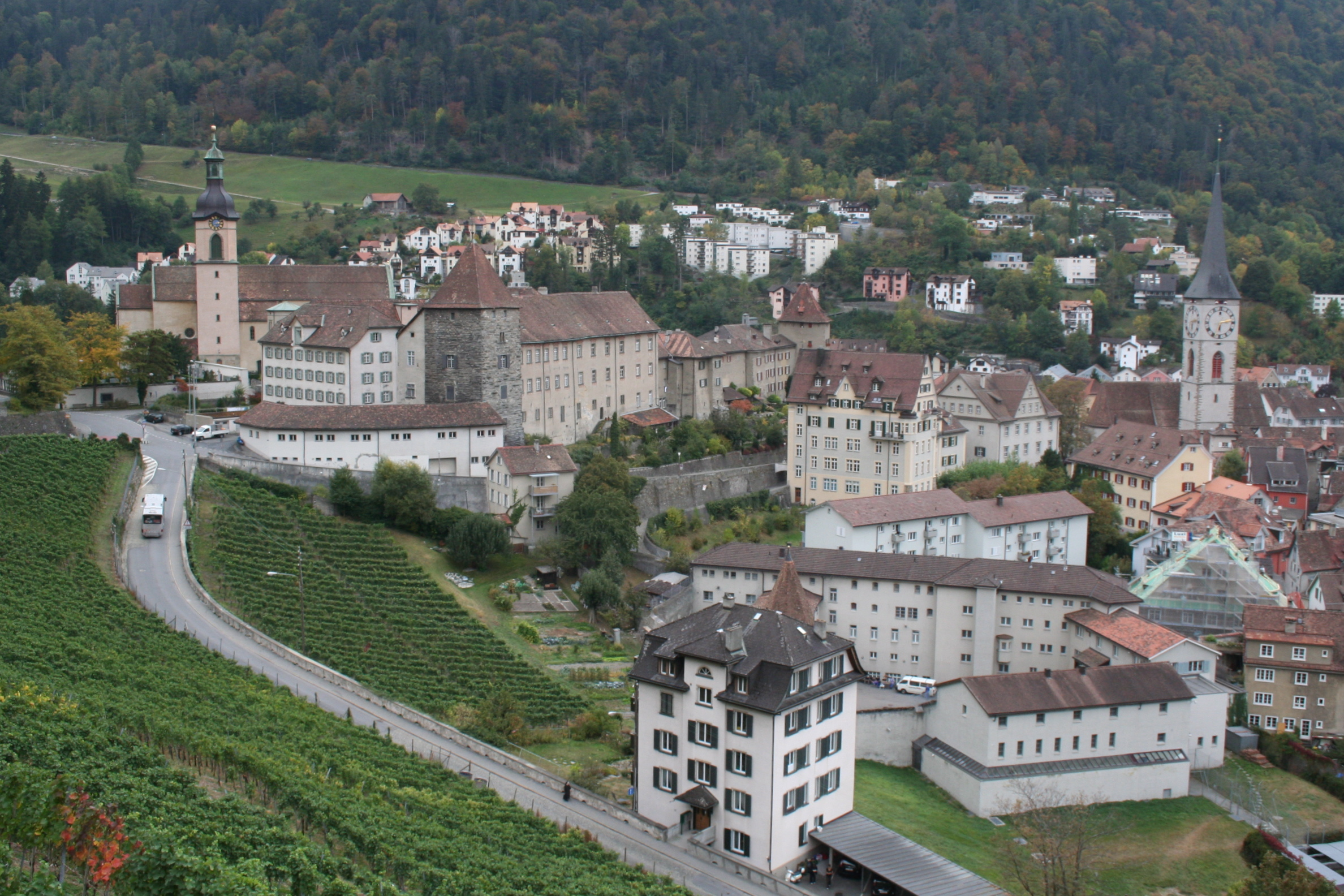
The Episcopal Court above the city of Chur, with Chur Cathedral (left)

== History ==
The Bishopric of Chur was first founded in 451, when Asinio was made Bishop of Chur. In 1170, Emperor Frederick I raised the Bishopric of Chur to the title of Prince-Bishopric of Chur.

In October 1621, Colonel Baldiron of Austria attacked the Prince-Bishopric of Chur, and the League of God's House as a whole, with 8,000 men. On November 22 of the same year, Baldiron and his soldiers captured Chur. In the ensuing peace deal, Austria took the Lower Engadine from Chur, and retained the right to station troops in Chur, and use their roads. On October 27, 1624, an army of 8,000 French and Swiss soldiers attacked the Austrians stationed at Chur, led by the marquis de Coeuvres. Because Austria had pulled much of her garrison back during spring, the 8,000 strong army quickly overtook the Austrian skeleton garrison, and seized Chur and the surrounding land. During the time of the Transalpine campaigns of the Old Swiss Confederacy, the Three Leagues took control of Valtellina, Bormio, and Chiavenna.

== Religion ==
As an ecclesiastical state, their leader was appointed by the Pope. It is, however, known that at least once, in 1440, the Bishop-elect requested confirmation from the Archbishop of Mainz, rather than the current pope, Eugenius IV. In 1441 Heinrich von Höwen, who was already the Bishop of Constance, became the Bishop of Chur as well. On 12 January 1447, Pope Eugenius IV issued a papal bull to Emperor Frederick III, allowing him to nominate bishops for Chur, for the rest of his life.

== Bishops ==
- Henry II: 1180–1193
- Arnold II: 1210–24 December 1221
- Rudolf II: 1223–1226
- Berthold: 1226−25 August 1233
- Ulrich IV: 1233–1237
- Volcnand: 1238–1251
- Heinrich von Höwen: 1441−?
