= Joseph Maria Bonnemain =

Swiss Catholic bishop (born 1948)

The Right Reverend Joseph Maria Bonnemain Opus Dei
- Bishop of Chur
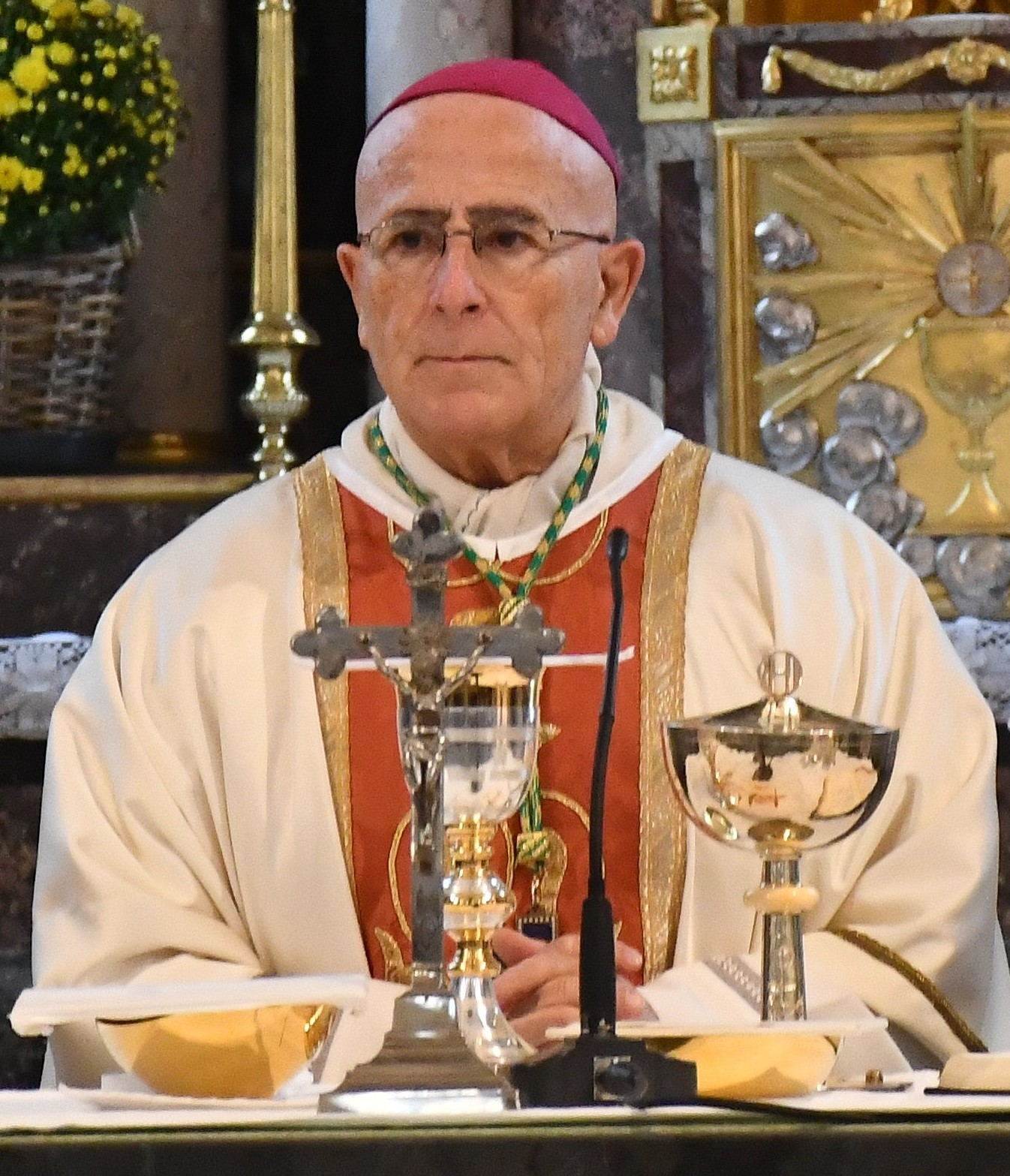
- Bishop Joseph Maria Bonnemain, 2025
- Church: Catholic Church
- Diocese: Diocese of Chur
- See: Chur
- Appointed: 15 February 2021
- Installed: 19 March 2021
- Predecessor: Vitus Huonder

Orders
- Ordination: 15 August 1978 by Franz Cardinal König
- Consecration: 19 March 2021 by Kurt Cardinal Koch

Personal details
- Born: 26 July 1948 (age 78) Barcelona, Spain
- Denomination: Roman Catholic

Joseph Maria Bonnemain (born 26 July 1948) is a Swiss prelate of the Catholic Church who has been the bishop of the Diocese de Chur since 2021.

== Life ==
Bonnemain was born on 26 July 1948 in Barcelona, the son of a Swiss father and a Spanish mother. He speaks Catalan, Spanish, French, German, Italian, and Portuguese. After completing school in 1967, he studied medicine at the University of Zurich, completing his studies in 1975.

While in Barcelona, Bonnemain established a connection with Opus Dei. He studied philosophy and theology in Rome. On 15 August 1978, he was ordained a priest by Cardinal Franz König in Torreciudad and four years later incardinated into the personal prelature of Opus Dei. In 1980, he completed a doctorate in canon law at the University of Navarre. During this time, he also worked as a chaplain for workers and farmers in the Navarre region.

From 1981, Bonnemain worked at the diocesan curia for the Diocese of Chur as a judicial lawyer and from 1982 as vice official. From 1983 to 1991, he was a member of the Delegation of the Holy See to the World Health Organization (WHO) in Geneva. In 1985, he was a chaplain at the Limmattal hospital in Schlieren in Zürich. In 1989 he was named an official of the Diocese of Chur. From 2002, he served as secretary for the Commission on Sexual Abuse in the Church established by the Swiss Bishops' Conference. In 2003, he was named a canon of the Chur cathedral chapter. In 2008, he was made a member of the Bishop's Council and in 2009 he was appointed a Chaplain of His Holiness. From 2011, he worked as episcopal vicar for canon law and for the cantons of the Diocese.

After the cathedral chapter rejected all three candidates, Pope Francis proposed as their new bishop, (Note: "Since the 15th century, by virtue of the 1448 Concordat of Vienna and then the 1948 papal decree Etsi Salva, the Chapter of Chur has been enjoying the rare ecclesial privilege of electing its bishops. According to that procedure, it is the responsibility of the apostolic nuncio of Switzerland to identify three possible candidates (after consulting the bishops’ conference, the cathedral chapter of Chur, as well as some clergymen, nuns and lay people from the diocese) and submit the list, known as the terna, to the Holy See. After getting Rome’s approval, the terna is then sent to the canons of Chur, who must elect one of the three candidates.") the pope appointed Bonnemain the bishop of Chur on 15 February 2021. His name had reportedly been rejected by the chapter because of his age. Despite his age, he agreed to serve for at least five years. He received his episcopal consecration on 19 March from Cardinal Kurt Koch. Bonnemain had women play all the roles allowed in the service. He said he will not have a coat of arms: "The sign of the Cross of Christ is enough for me. And this, only this, I will use."

In November 2022, Bonnemain announced he would not fill the position of exorcist, saying "In most cases, people are simply suffering mental or psychological stress. They need support, prayers, a blessing or other appropriate services – but not necessarily a major exorcism." For years the Chur diocese attracted foreigners because it was one of the few in the region still performing exorcisms.
