= Johannes Ambundii =

German ecclesiastic

Johannes Ambundii de Swan
- Archbishop of Riga
- Church: Catholic Church
- Archdiocese: Archdiocese of Riga
- In office: 11 July 1418 – 16 June 1424
- Predecessor: Johannes von Wallenrode
- Successor: Henning Scharpenberg
- Previous post: Bishop of Chur (1418)

Orders
- Consecration: 13 March 1418 by Johann von Nassau-Wiesbaden-Idstein

Personal details
- Died: 16 June 1424

Johannes VI Ambundii, Archbishopric of Riga 1418-1424, secular name Johannes Ambundii de Swan, also Abundi, Ambundij, Habundi, Habendi, Habindi, Almanni and ~ von Schwan (born 1384; died 16 June 1424) was a German ecclesiastic. Ambundii is thought to be born in the area of Stettin (Szczecin) in Pomerania. He studied at the Juristical University of Prague, and graduated in 1391. Later, he got his doctor in theology and canonical law.

== Career ==
From 1394–1399 he was general vicar of the bishop of Bamberg. In 1401, he was general vicar in Speyer, and in 1408 general vicar in Würzburg.

In 1412, he visited the Scottish convent of St. Ägidius in Nuremberg, by order of the bishop of Bamberg. He was canon of the church of Eichstädt and provost of Herriden in 1414 or 1415 and as such took part at the Council of Constance. On 27 November 1416 he was elected bishop of Chur and affirmed by the archbishop of Mainz, Johann II. Shortly afterwards, Ambundii returned to the council.

At this time, Italy, France and Spain demanded the immediate election of the pope, while the Holy Roman Empire preferred to first initiate the reform of the Church. Ambundii convinced Emperor Sigismund to give priority to the election.

On 11 July 1418 Pope Martin V by recommendation of the Emperor nominated Johannes Ambundii to the position of Archbishopric of Riga where he stayed until 1424. In Riga Ambundii initiated the establishment of the Livonian Confederation.

On 13 October 1418 Ambundii participated in the negotiations between the State of the Teutonic Order and the Kingdom of Poland in Wileny.

Ambundii was unhappy with his new office in the far north. The German brothers from the order deemed him a bitter and scant man, which is not a laudable trait for great men as a chaplain said. It was seen with anxiety that Ambundii was a counselor of the Emperor and considered his favorite. The order tried to acquire Livonia as independent property from the Emperor and feared Ambundii would act in opposition to the efforts. In fact, it was caused by him that the chapter of Riga asked the pope to revoke the Bulle Bonifacii IX, which incorporated the Church of Riga to the order.

In 1421 he acted as papal delegated judge in a quarrel between the king of Sweden and the bishop of Uppsala. In 1422 he organized a council of the Prussian bishops, but it did not take place.

Catholic Church titles
Preceded by Johannes von Wallenrode	Prince-Archbishop of Riga; 1418–1424	Succeeded by Henning Scharpenberg
