= Thomas Planta (bishop) =

Bishop of Chur (1520–1565)

- Bishop of Chur
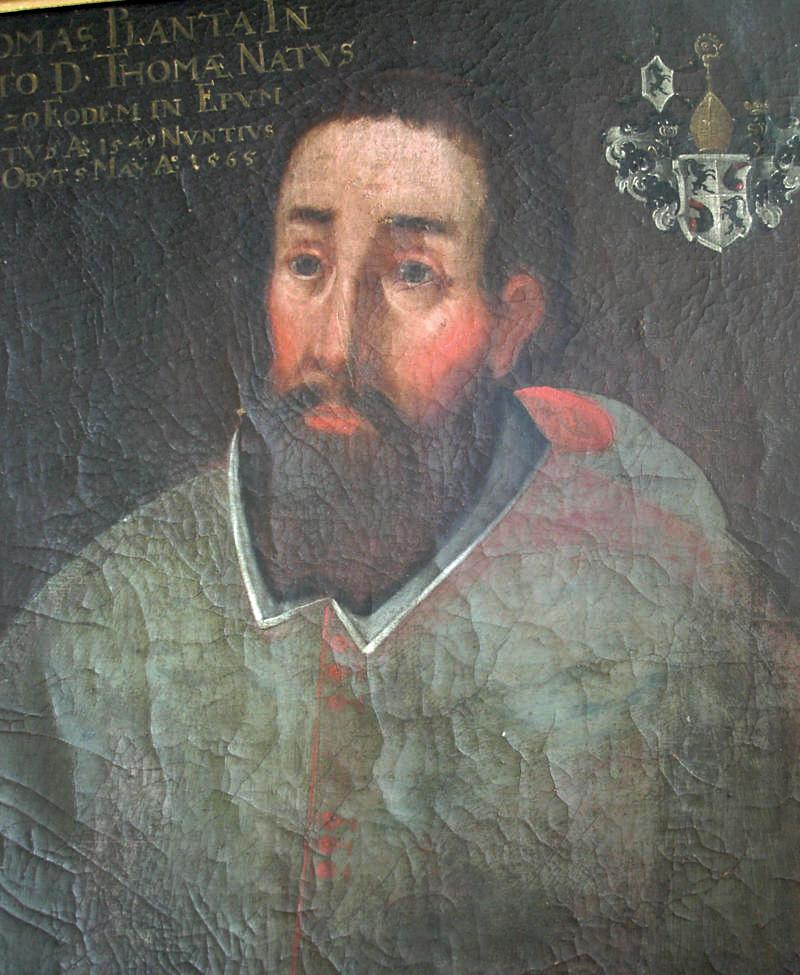
- Portrait, after 1565
- Church: Catholic Church
- Diocese: Chur
- Elected: 1549
- Previous post: Cathedral cantor in Chur

Orders
- Consecration: 1551

Personal details
- Born: 21 December 1520
- Died: 28 April 1565 (aged 44) Bad Fideris, Fideris, Switzerland

Thomas Planta (21 December 1520 – 28 April 1565) was a bishop of Chur. Elected in 1549, he took part in the Council of Trent in 1551–1552, and he secured the survival of the diocese thanks to his accommodating stance toward the League of God's House.

== Biography ==
Thomas Planta was a member of the Planta family. He was the son of Hartmann and a woman of the Schucan family. He studied in Vienna in 1537, and in 1543 he is recorded as cathedral cantor (Domkantor) in Chur.

In 1549 Planta was elected bishop of Chur, and papal confirmation followed in 1550. He had to defend himself in Rome against the charge of heresy brought by his rival Bartholomäus von Salis, and he was consecrated bishop there in 1551. In 1551–1552 he took part in the Council of Trent, and in 1552–1553 he was nuncio for the Grisons. He secured the survival of the diocese thanks to his accommodating stance toward the League of God's House. He managed the diocese prudently but refused to undertake reforms. He died at Bad Fideris, in the municipality of Fideris, in 1565.

== Bibliography ==
- Helvetia Sacra, I/1, 495
- Die Bischöfe des Heiligen Römischen Reiches 1448–1648, edited by E. Gatz, 1996, 543–544
