= Las Valeras =

Las Valeras, Spain
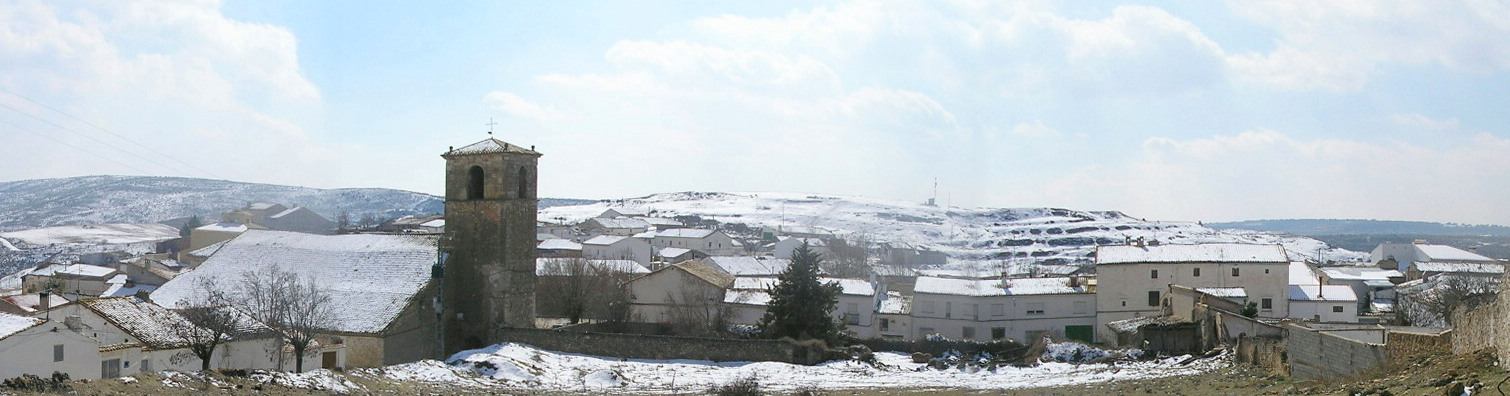
- Panoramic view of Las Valeras

- Coat of arms

- Location within Spain Location within Castilla-La Mancha
- Coordinates: 39°46′07″N 02°09′29″W
- Country: Spain
- Autonomous community: Castile-La Mancha
- Province: Cuenca
- Municipality: Las Valeras

Area
  - Total: 113 km^{2} (44 sq mi)

Population (2025-01-01)
  - Total: 1,528
  - Density: 13.5/km^{2} (35.0/sq mi)
- Time zone: UTC+1 (CET)
  - Summer (DST): UTC+2 (CEST)

Las Valeras is a municipality located in the province of Cuenca, Castile-La Mancha, Spain. According to the 2004 census (INE), the municipality had a population of 1,399 inhabitants.
