= Reform of a religious order =

The reform of a religious order is the return of the order from a mitigated or relaxed observance to the rigour of its primitive rule. Example include the Cluniac Reforms and the English Benedictine Reform.
