= Francesco Canalini =

Italian prelate of the Catholic Church (born 1936)

His Excellency, The Most Reverend Francesco Canalini
- Apostolic Nuncio emeritus of Switzerland and Liechtenstein; Titular Archbishop of Valeria
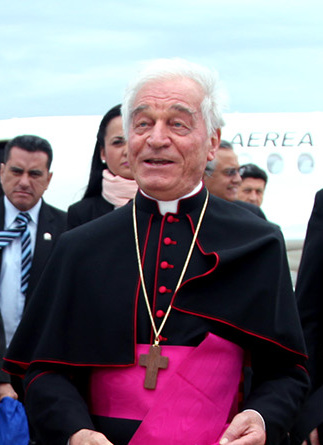
- Canalini in April 2015
- Appointed: 8 September 2004
- Retired: 28 May 2011
- Predecessor: Pier Giacomo De Nicolò
- Successor: Diego Causero
- Other post: Titular Archbishop of Valeria
- Previous posts: Apostolic Nuncio of Australia (1998–2004); Apostolic Nuncio of Ecuador (1991–1998); Apostolic Pro-Nuncio of Indonesia (1986–1991)

Orders
- Ordination: 18 March 1961 by Domenico Brizi
- Consecration: 12 July 1986 by Agostino Casaroli, Jose Tomas Sanchez, and Carlo Maccari

Personal details
- Born: March 23, 1936 (age 90) Osimo, Ancona, Italy

Styles of Francesco Canalini
- Reference style: His Excellency; The Most Reverend
- Spoken style: Your Excellency
- Religious style: Archbishop

Francesco Canalini (born 23 March 1936) is an Italian prelate of the Catholic Church who spent his career in the diplomatic service of the Holy See.

== Biography ==
Francesco Canalini was born in Osimo, Italy, on 23 March 1936. He was ordained a priest on 19 March 1961.

== Diplomatic career ==
To prepare for a diplomatic career he entered the Pontifical Ecclesiastical Academy in 1966. His early assignments in the diplomatic service included work at a meeting of the Conference on Security and Co-operation in Europe (CSCE) in 1974.

On 28 May 1986, Pope John Paul II appointed him a titular archbishop and Apostolic Pro-Nuncio to Indonesia. He received his episcopal consecration on 12 July 1986 from Cardinal Agostino Casaroli. Pope John Paul II visited Indonesia while Canalini was nuncio there.

On 20 July 1991, he was named Apostolic Nuncio to Ecuador.

On 5 December 1998, he was appointed Apostolic Nuncio to Australia.

On 8 September 2004, Pope John Paul II named him Apostolic Nuncio to Switzerland and to Liechtenstein. He retired from the diplomatic service in April 2011.

He was later Vicar of the Basilica of Santa Maria Maggiore.

== See also ==
- List of heads of the diplomatic missions of the Holy See
