= Tello (bishop of Chur) =

Bishop of Chur

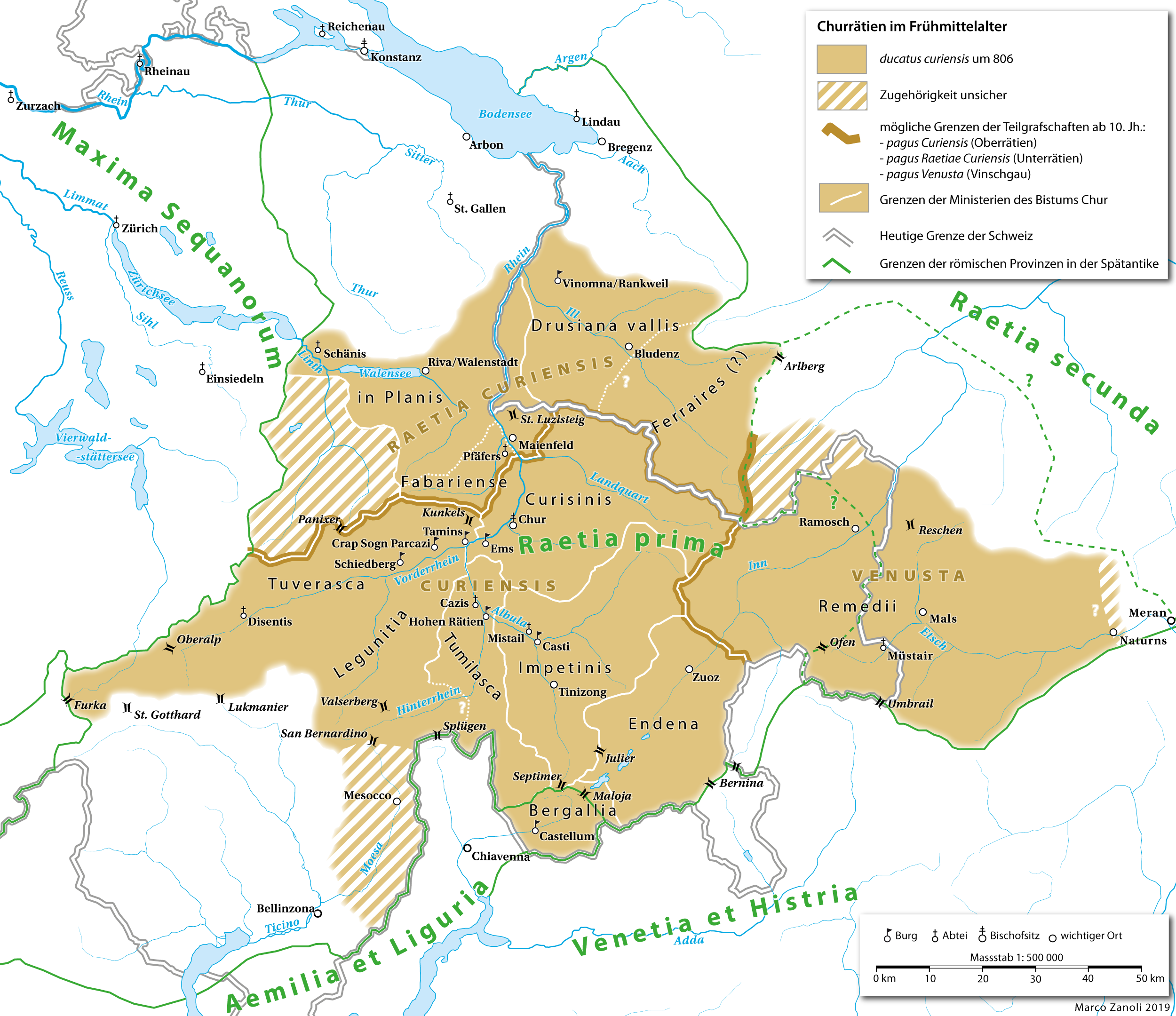
The ducatus Curiensis (or duchy of Chur) corresponded more or less with the diocese of the same name (dioecesis Curiensis) at the time of Tello, who had control over both.

Tello (died 24 September probably 765) was the Bishop of Chur from 758/759 until his death. He was the last member of the episcopal dynasty of the Victorids to wield power in Rhaetia through his control of the bishopric. His will is one of the earliest surviving records from Graubünden and is an important source for the history of Rhaetia in the eighth century.

According to his will, dated 15 December 765, and the Liber de feodis of 1388, he was a son of Victor, the praeses of Rhaetia, and his wife Teusenda. It is also mentioned in the will that he had brothers and sisters, though they are left unnamed. His episcopate can be demonstrated from 759 and he held, concurrently, the title of praeses, which had been his father's. He thus held both the spiritual and the temporal authority in the province.

He is mentioned in the Vita sancti Galli of Walafrid Strabo under the year 759 or 760. In 762 he participated in the Council of Attigny on the Aisne as a suffragan of the Archdiocese of Mainz. His signature appears on the conciliar documents. Tello is elsewhere documented in the Verbrüderungsbuch (fraternity book) of the Abbey of Reichenau. He began the construction of the cathedral, which has an unusual crypt and was renovated in the Romanesque style.

His death date is secured as 24 September, but the year is unknown, probably the same year as that of his will, which was dated to December. He bequeathed his extensive landed and movable wealth, which was concentrated in the lower Surselva between Flims and Trun, to Disentis Abbey, with which he had had close ties.

== Sources ==
- Erich Wenneker (1996). "Tello (bishop of Chur)". In Bautz, Traugott (ed.). Biographisch-Bibliographisches Kirchenlexikon (BBKL) (in German). Vol. 11. Herzberg: Bautz. cols. 644–646. ISBN 3-88309-064-6.
