= Amédée Grab =

Swiss Roman Catholic bishop (1930–2019)

Amédée Grab O.S.B.
- Bishop of Chur
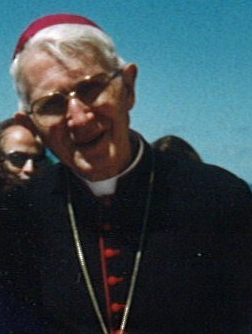
- Church: Roman Catholic Church
- Diocese: Chur
- Appointed: 12 June 1998
- Installed: 23 August 1998
- Term ended: 5 February 2007
- Predecessor: Wolfgang Haas
- Successor: Vitus Huonder
- Previous posts: Auxiliary Bishop of Lausanne, Geneva and Fribourg (1987-1995); Titular Bishop of Cenae (1987-1995); Bishop of Lausanne, Geneva and Fribourg (1995-1998)

Orders
- Ordination: 12 June 1954
- Consecration: 12 April 1987 by Pierre Mamie

Personal details
- Born: 3 February 1930 Zürich, Switzerland
- Died: 19 May 2019 (aged 89) Roveredo, Switzerland
- Buried: Chur
- Denomination: Roman Catholic
- Coat of arms

Amédée Grab, O.S.B. (3 February 1930 – 19 May 2019) was a Swiss prelate of the Catholic Church who served as bishop of Chur from 1998 to 2007. He was an auxiliary bishop of the Diocese of Lausanne from 1987 to 1995 and then bishop there until 1998.

== Biography ==
Born Antoine-Marie Grab on 3 February 1930 in Zürich, he was raised first in Schwyz and then in Geneva alongside his three brothers by his father Joseph, an accountant, and his mother Germaine, a stenographer. He entered the École Saint-Louis in Geneva at the age of eleven, having already decided to become a priest. In 1947, he moved to the Lycée of Einsiedeln where he completed his baccalaureate in German 1949. In 1950, he took his first vows as a Benedictine and took the name Amédée. He took his solemn vows in 1953.

He was ordained a priest of the Order of Saint Benedict on 12 June 1954. He continued his studies in Perugia and then taught at the Collegio Papio in Ascona from 1958 to 1978. His many temporary assignments included working as a confessor for monasteries and religious communities as well as serving on diocesan commissions. He assisted with preparatory the national “Synod 72” and for Pope John Paul's visit to Switzerland in 1984. He also taught at the preparatory school in Einsiedeln in 1983/84. He became Secretary of the Swiss Bishops Conference in 1984.

Coat of arms of Amédée Grab as bishop ofLausanne, Geneva and Fribourg

On 3 February 1987, Pope John Paul II appointed him titular bishop of Cenae and auxiliary bishop of the Roman Catholic Diocese of Lausanne, Geneva and Fribourg. He received his episcopal consecration on 12 April from the bishop of Lausanne, Pierre Mamie.

On 9 November 1995, Pope John Paul named him bishop there. He was installed on 26 November.

Pope John Paul appointed him bishop of Chur on 12 June 1998. He was installed on 23 August. His appointment followed the troubled tenure of his predecessor; never before had a sitting bishop been moved from one Swiss diocese to another. The pope had also failed to consult the canons of the cathedral chapter of Chur in accordance with ancient practice. (Note: "Since the 15th century, by virtue of the 1448 Concordat of Vienna and then the 1948 papal decree Etsi Salva, the Chapter of Chur has been enjoying the rare ecclesial privilege of electing its bishops. According to that procedure, it is the responsibility of the apostolic nuncio of Switzerland to identify three possible candidates (after consulting the bishops’ conference, the cathedral chapter of Chur, as well as some clergymen, nuns and lay people from the diocese) and submit the list, known as the terna, to the Holy See. After getting Rome’s approval, the terna is then sent to the canons of Chur, who must elect one of the three candidates.")

He was president of the Swiss Bishops Conference from 1998 to 2006 and led the Conference of Episcopal Conferences of Europe from 2001 to 2006.

Pope Benedict XVI accepted his resignation on 5 February 2007, two years after Grab had submitted it. He remained apostolic administrator of the diocese until the installation of his successor six months later. In retirement he lived at the seminary of Saint Lucius in Chur until 2017, when he moved to Roveredo.

He died in Roveredo on 19 May 2019.
