= Victor III (bishop of Chur) =

Victor III (died 7 January before 836) was the Bishop of Chur from after 800 until his death. He was the last member of the Victorid family to hold the bishopric of Chur and the secular power in Rhaetia concurrently.

He succeeded the bishop Remedius. During his episcopate the ecclesiastic and secular authority in Rhaetia were separated. The diocese lost control over the property of the county and Victor complained several times about the conduct of the count Roderich, probably an Aleman. These complaints had only limited success. In 831 restitution was made to the diocese and Victor obtained immunity for the properties then held by the Church in Rhaetia, Alemannia, and Alsace.

In 836 Victor's successor, his vicar Verendarius, is mentioned as bishop, so Victor presumably died some time beforehand.

== Sources ==
- Erich Wenneker (1997). "Victor III., Bischof von Chur". In Bautz, Traugott (ed.). Biographisch-Bibliographisches Kirchenlexikon (BBKL) (in German). Vol. 12. Herzberg: Bautz. cols. 1346–1348. ISBN 3-88309-068-9.
