= Concordat of Vienna =

1488 treaty between the Holy Roman Empire and Holy See

The Concordat of Vienna was a treaty concluded on 17 February 1448 between the Holy Roman Empire and the Holy See.

== Background ==
In the Princes' Concordat, concluded in January 1447 between Pope Eugenius IV and the prince-electors of the Holy Roman Empire, Eugenius agreed to restore the archbishop-electors of Trier and Mainz, whom he had deposed for supporting the Council of Basel and the antipope it elected, Amadeus VIII, Duke of Savoy. In exchange, the princes recognized Eugenius as the legitimate Pope.

== The treaty ==
The Concordat of Vienna was signed by Frederick III, Holy Roman Emperor and the papal legate Cardinal Juan Carvajal on 17 February 1448. Pope Nicholas V confirmed the treaty on 19 March. It provided that the initial selection of bishops was to take place without papal interference, but the pope continued to exercise the right to confirm such selections and to replace bishops he deemed unworthy, terms, writes one historian, "manifestly ... in the Pope's favor". Another writes: "It represented the complete victory of the curia over the reform party ..., more favourable to the Papacy than the similar Concordat of 1418" and "gave the Pope more control over the Church in Germany than in any other country".

It governed relations between the Holy Roman Empire and the Holy See until the dissolution of the Empire on 6 August 1806.
