= Victor I (bishop of Chur) =

7th-century Frankish bishop

Victor I was a 7th-century bishop of Chur, the first of the Victorid family which was to control the bishopric and the province of Rhaetia until the early ninth century.

On 10 October 614, he signed the canons of the Fifth Council of Paris on church discipline. His participation in a Frankish church council signifies the breaking away of the diocese of Chur from the Archdiocese of Milan to which it was nominally attached.

== Sources ==
- Erich Wenneker (1997). "Victor I., Bischof von Chur". In Bautz, Traugott (ed.). Biographisch-Bibliographisches Kirchenlexikon (BBKL) (in German). Vol. 12. Herzberg: Bautz. cols. 1344–1345. ISBN 3-88309-068-9.
