= Swiss Bishops' Conference =

Coordination body of the Catholic dioceses in Switzerland

Logo of the bishops' conference

The Swiss Bishops' Conference (SBC; German: Schweizer Bischofskonferenz; French: Conférence des évêques suisses; Italian: Conferenza dei vescovi svizzeri; Romansh: Conferenza dals uvestgs svizzers) is the coordinating body of the Catholic dioceses in Switzerland. It was founded in 1863 as the world's first Bishops Conference and is a member of the Council of European Bishops' Conferences.

== Members ==
It meets quarterly and comprises nine members: the bishops of the six dioceses of Switzerland, the auxiliary bishops and the two abbots of Saint-Maurice and Einsiedeln.

- Bishops of dioceses:
  - Felix Gmür (Basel)
  - Charles Morerod, O.P. (Lausanne, Geneva and Fribourg)
  - Alain de Raemy (Apostolic administrator of Lugano)
  - Markus Büchel (Saint Gallen)
  - Jean-Marie Lovey, C.R.B. (Sion)
  - Joseph Maria Bonnemain (Chur)
- Auxiliary bishop by diocese:
  - Alain de Raemy (Lausanne, Geneva and Fribourg)
- Territorial abbots by abbey:
  - Urban Federer, O.S.B. (Einsiedeln)
  - Jean César Scarcella, C.R.A. (Saint-Maurice)

=== Dioceses ===
- Roman Catholic Diocese of Basel, based in Solothurn
- Roman Catholic Diocese of Chur, based in Chur
- Roman Catholic Diocese of Lausanne, Geneva and Fribourg, based in Fribourg
- Roman Catholic Diocese of Lugano, based in Lugano
- Roman Catholic Diocese of Saint Gallen, based in St. Gallen
- Roman Catholic Diocese of Sion, based in Sion

=== Territorial abbeys ===
- Einsiedeln Abbey
- Abbey of St. Maurice, Agaunum

== Presidents ==
- Pierre-François de Preux, Bishop of Sion (1863–1875)
- Marilley Etienne, Bishop of Lausanne (1876–1879)
- Karl Johann Greith, Bishop of St. Gallen (1880–1881)
- Eugene Lachat, Bishop of Basel (1882–1886)
- Gaspard Mermillod, Bishop of Lausanne and Geneva (1887–1890)
- Adrien Jardinier, Bishop of Sion (1891–1894)
- Augustine Egger, Bishop of St. Gallen (1895–1905)
- John Fidelis Battaglia, Bishop of Chur (1906–1911)
- Jules-Maurice Abbet, Bishop of Sion (1912–1917)
- Jakob Stammler, Bishop of Basle-Lugano (1918–1924)
- Georg Schmid Grüneck, Bishop of Chur (1925–1931)
- Aurelio Bacciarini, Apostolic Administrator of the Tessin (1932–1933)
- Victor Biel, Bishop of Sion (1935–1951)
- Angelo Jelmini, Apostolic Administrator of Lugano (1952–1967)
- Vonderach John, Bishop of Chur (1967–1970)
- Nestor Adam, Bishop of Sion (1970–1976)
- Anton Hänggi, Bishop of Basel (1976–1977)
- Pierre Mamie, Bishop of Lausanne, Geneva and Fribourg (1977–1979)
- Otmar Maeder, Bishop of St. Gallen (1980–1982)
- Henri Schwery, Bishop of Sion (1983–1988)
- Joseph Candolfi, Auxiliary Bishop of Basel (1989–1991), illegally, not because the diocesan bishop. Complaint of Rome.
- Pierre Mamie, Bishop of Lausanne, Geneva and Fribourg (1992–1994) (2x)
- Henri Salina C.R.A., abbot of Saint-Maurice (1995–1997)
- Amédée Grab O.S.B., Bishop of Chur (1998–2006)
- Kurt Koch, Bishop of Basel (2007–2009)
- Norbert Brunner, Bishop of Sion (2010–2012)
- Markus Büchel, Bishop of St. Gallen (2013–2015)
- Charles Morerod, Bishop of Lausanne, Geneva and Fribourg (2016–2018)
- Felix Gmür, Bishop of Basel (since 2019)

== See also ==
- Catholic Church in Switzerland
