= Catholic Church in Switzerland =

- German: Katholische Kirche in der Schweiz; French: Église catholique en Suisse; Italian: Chiesa cattolica in Svizzera; Romansh: Baselgia catolica romana in Svizra
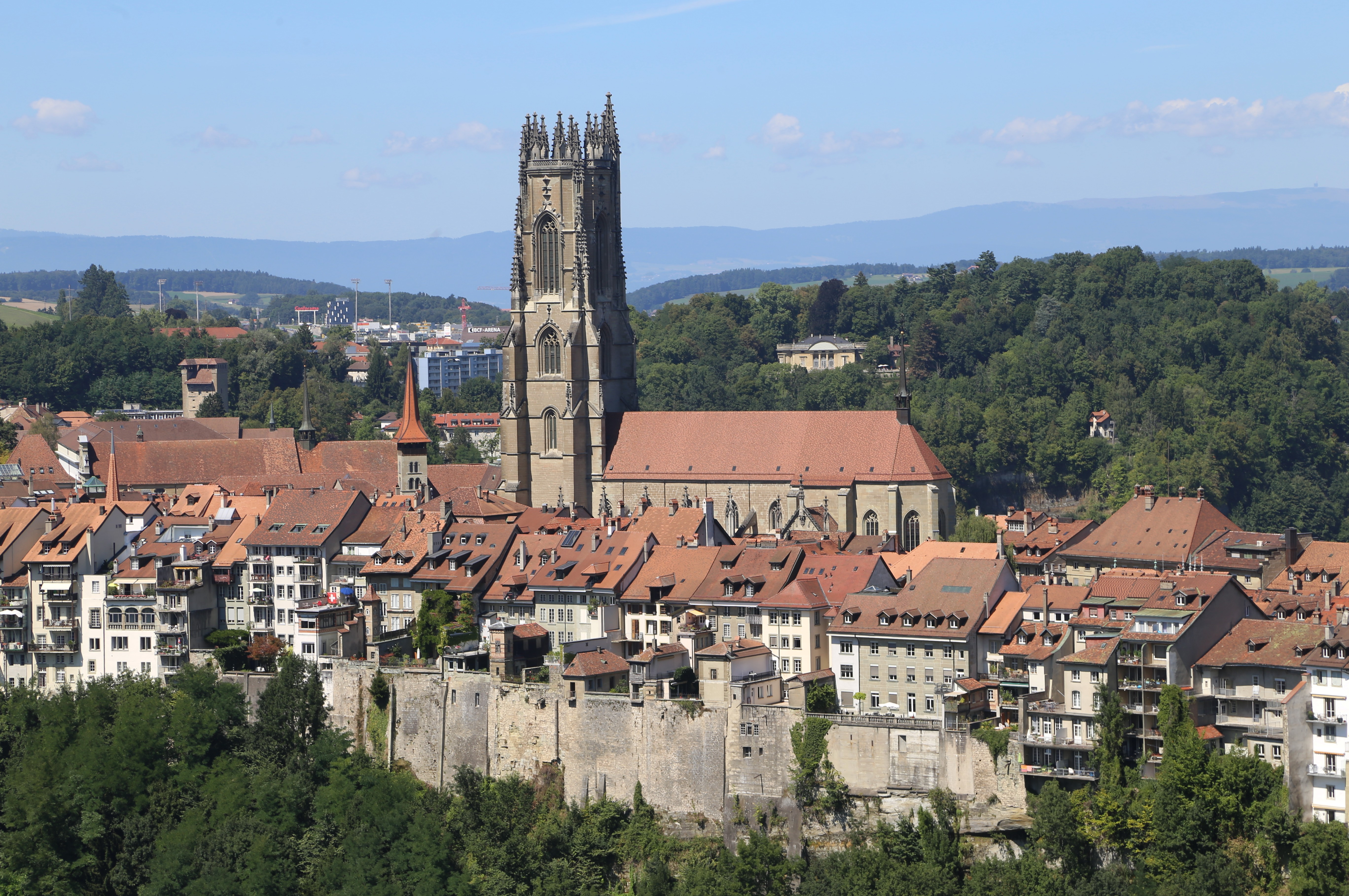
- Fribourg Cathedral
- Type: National polity
- Classification: Catholic
- Scripture: Bible
- Theology: Catholic theology
- Governance: SBC
- Pope: Leo XIV
- Region: Switzerland
- Language: German, French, Italian, Romansh, Latin
- Headquarters: Fribourg, Switzerland
- Separations: Swiss Reformed Church (16th Century); Old Catholics (19th Century)
- Members: 2,700,000 (2023)
- Official website: Swiss Bishop's Conference

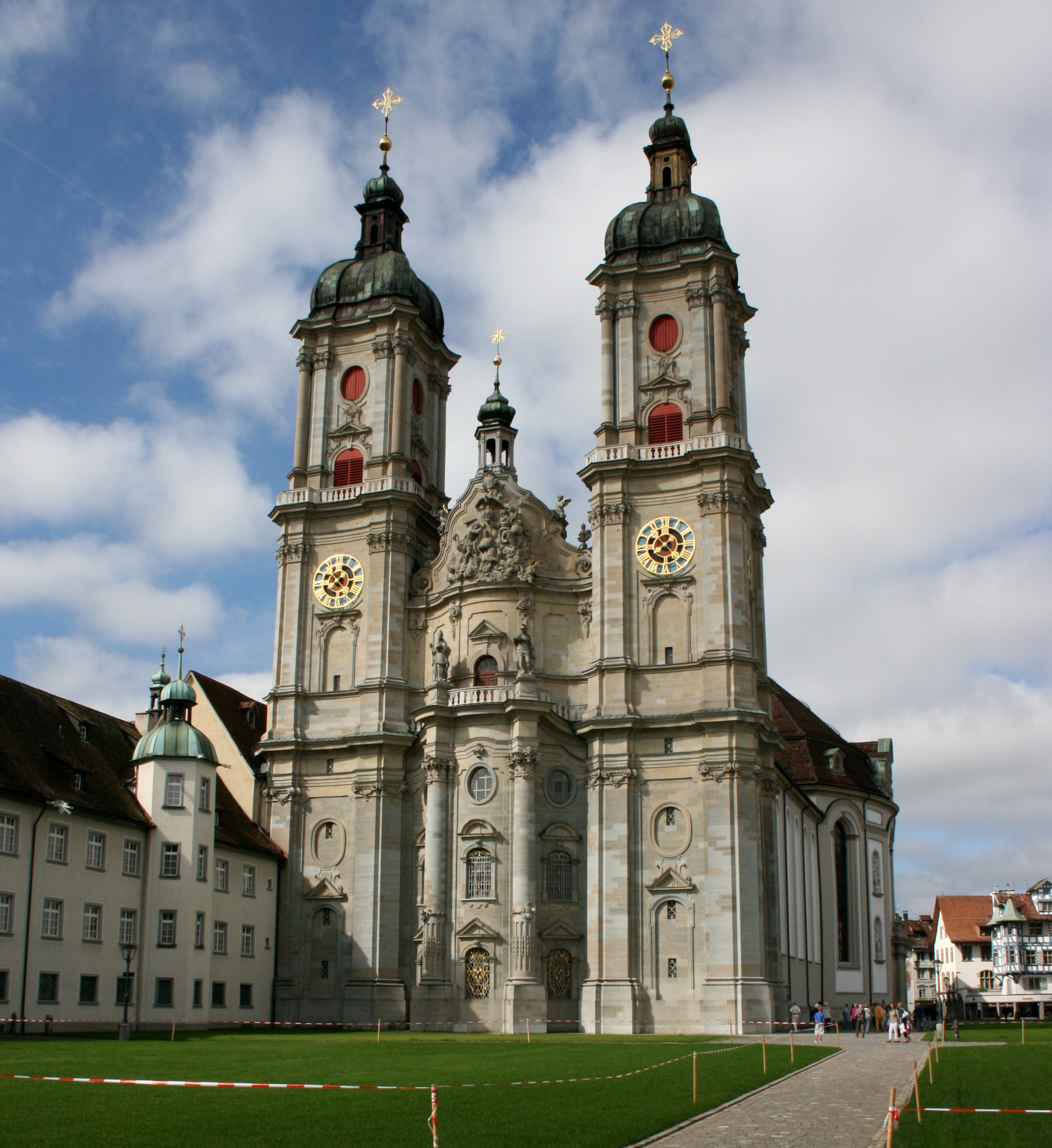
Stiftskirche St. Gallus und Otmar (St. Gallen)

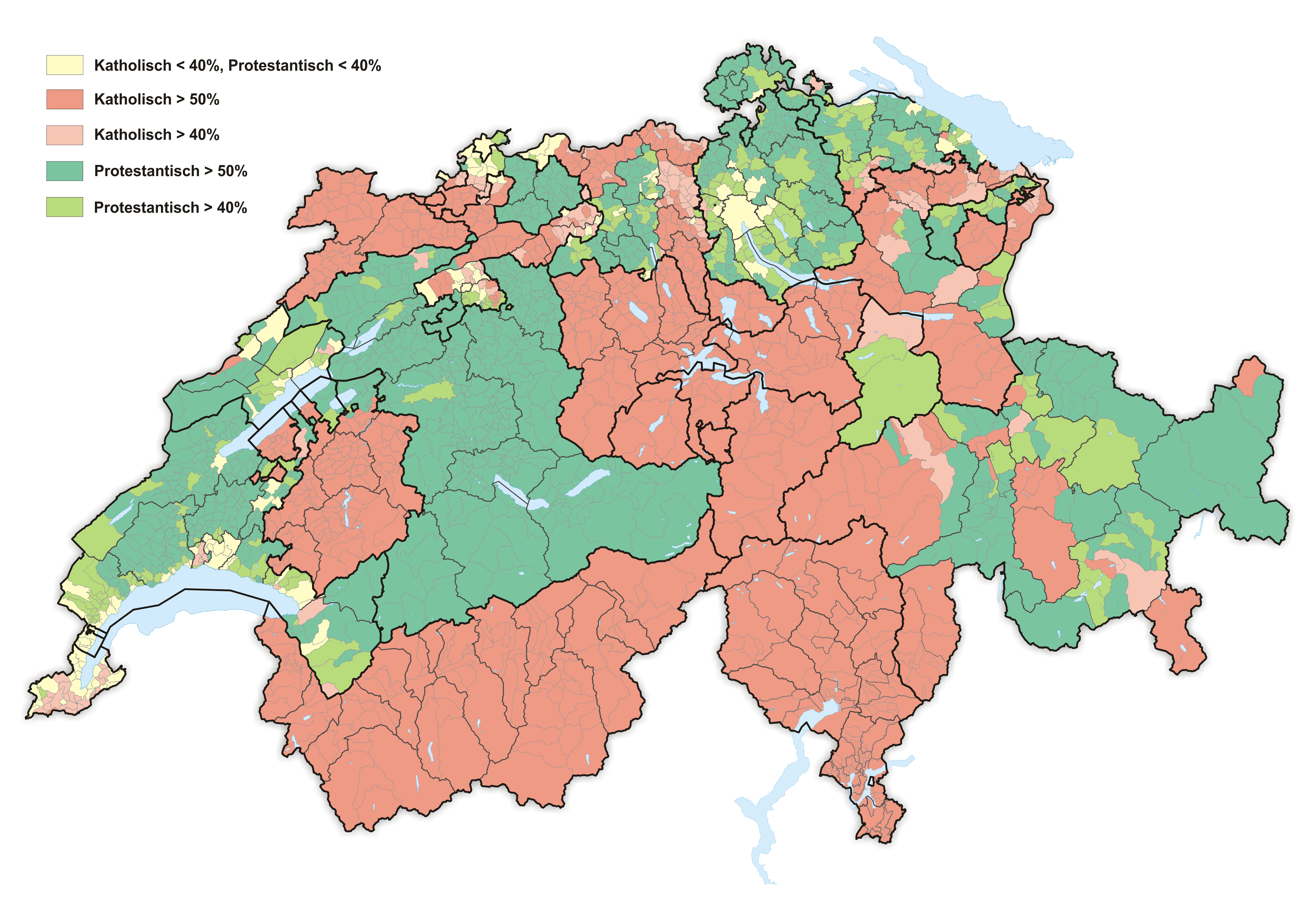
The traditionally Catholic regions of Switzerland are shown in red.

The Catholic Church in Switzerland (German: Römisch-katholische Landeskirche, French: Église catholique en Suisse, Italian: Chiesa cattolica in Svizzera, Romansh: Baselgia catolica da la Svizra) is organised into six dioceses and two territorial abbeys, comprising approximately 2.7 million Catholics, about 30.7% of the Swiss population in 2023.

== Diocesan organisation ==
The six dioceses are:

- Diocese of Basel, whose ordinary is Bishop Felix Gmür
- Diocese of Lausanne, Geneva and Fribourg, whose ordinary is Bishop Charles Morerod
- Diocese of Chur, whose ordinary is Bishop Joseph Maria Bonnemain
- Diocese of Lugano, whose ordinary is Bishop Valerio Lazzeri
- Diocese of Saint Gallen, whose ordinary is Bishop Beat Grögli
- Diocese of Sion, whose ordinary is Bishop Jean-Marie Lovey.

The two territorial abbeys, which do not belong to any bishopric, are

- St. Maurice's Abbey in the Canton of Valais, which is the longest continuously inhabited monastery in Europe, whose Abbot was Joseph Roduit,
- Einsiedeln Abbey, in the Canton of Schwyz.

In contrast to most Catholic dioceses, Swiss bishoprics are exempt, i.e. immediately subject to the jurisdiction of the Holy See, without any Metropolitan see. The bishops and the two territorial abbots are organised within the Swiss Bishops Conference.

Currently, there is one living Cardinal from Switzerland, Kurt Koch. The most recent cardinals are Gilberto Agustoni, who died in 2017, Henri Schwery, who died in 2021, and Emil Paul Tscherrig, who died in 2026. Kurt Cardinal Koch participated in the 2013 and 2025 papal conclaves. The latter was also attended by Tscherrig.

== History ==
The status of Catholicism in Switzerland is complicated due to the existence of Landeskirchen (Catholic cantonal churches), imposed by anti-clerical cantonal governments in the 19th century and organised along democratic lines, who control the application of funds collected through church taxes. Pope Gregory XVI's encyclical letter of 1835, Commissum divinitus, addressed this issue after the publication of the Swiss cantonal Articles of Baden of 1834 in the canton of Aargau. The letter challenged the Swiss attempt to "allow secular power [to] dominate the Church, control its doctrine, or interfere so that it cannot promulgate laws concerning the holy ministry, divine worship, and the spiritual welfare of the faithful".

Most cantonally delineated Catholic church bodies are members of the umbrella Roman Catholic Central Conference of Switzerland (RKZ, official names in German: Römisch-Katholische Zentralkonferenz der Schweiz, French: Conférence centrale catholique romaine de Suisse, Italian: Conferenza centrale cattolica romana della Svizzera, Romansh: Conferenza centrala catolica romana da la Svizra).

In the last thirty years, mainly during the conflict over the appointment of Wolfgang Haas as Bishop of Chur, there have been discussions regarding a major reform of the structure of the Catholic Church in Switzerland, which would probably also lead to the establishment of a metropolitan see (probably in Lucerne). However, discussions remain unresolved especially about the status of the Canton of Zürich as part of the Diocese of Chur, the large but splinted extent of the Diocese of Basel and the lack of a Metropolitan see stay unresolved.

== Catholic lay organizations in Switzerland ==
- Jungwacht Blauring (JuBla)

== See also ==
- Religion in Switzerland
- Freedom of religion in Switzerland
- List of Catholic dioceses in Switzerland
- Protestantism in Switzerland
- Pontifical Swiss Guard
- Serbian Orthodox Eparchy of Austria and Switzerland
