= Hofflügel =

Coordinates: 47.4232°N 9.3779°E

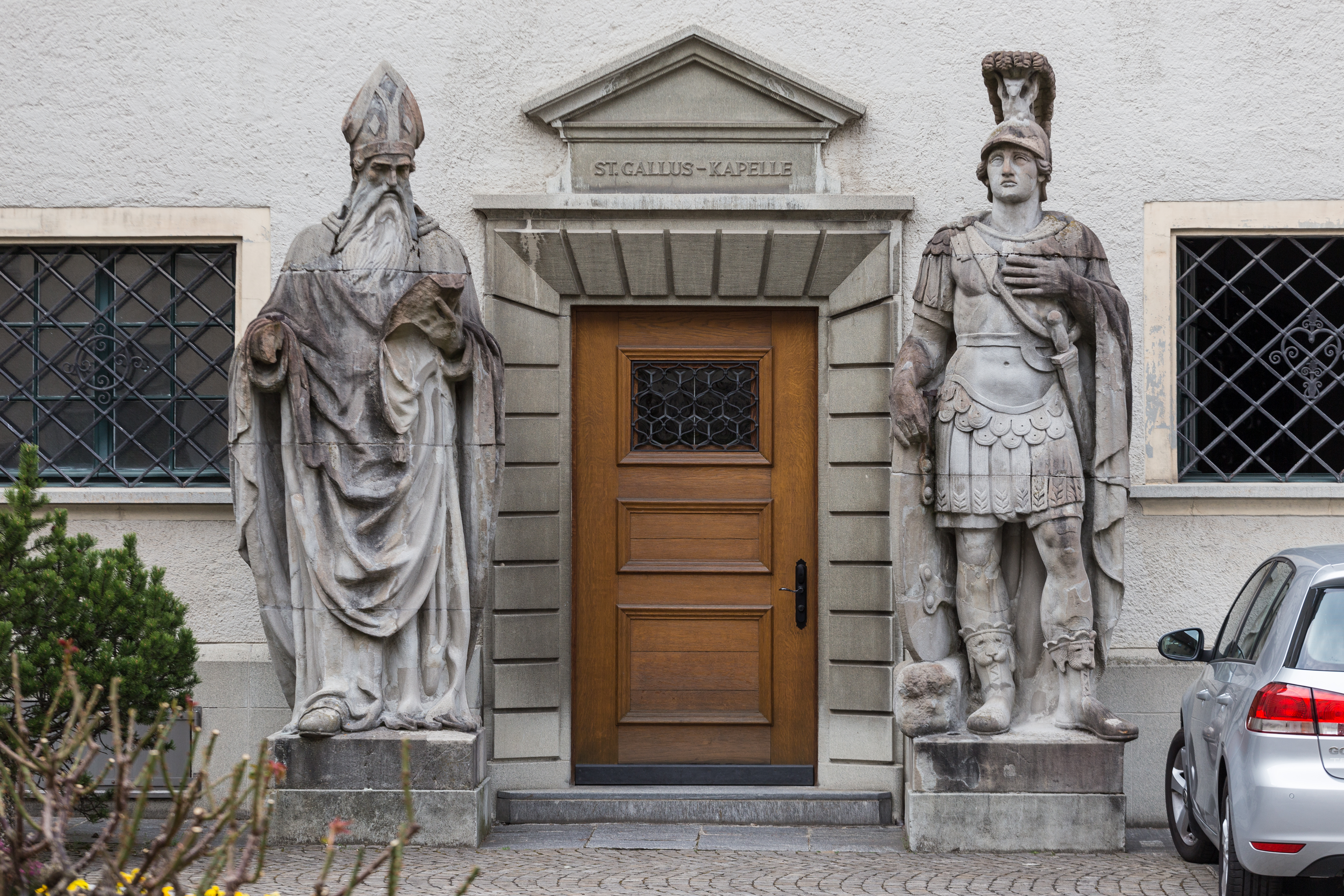
- Entrance to the Chapel, flanked by Desiderius of Vienne and St. Maurice

Religion
- Affiliation: Latin Catholic

Location
- Location: St. Gallen, Switzerland
- Interactive map of Hofflügel

Architecture
- Style: Baroque
- Groundbreaking: 1666
- Completed: 1667

The Hofflügel, located in St. Gallen, Switzerland, is the episcopal residence of the Diocese of St. Gallen. The Baroque-style building was constructed in 1666–1667 as the residence of the Abbot of the Abbey of St. Gallen. As part of the Abbey district, the building was included in the UNESCO list of protected World Heritage Sites in 1983.

== History ==
At the location of the Hofflügel, the first St. Gallus Chapel once stood, which was demolished in 1530 during the Reformation. The second chapel was consecrated in 1540, and in the spring of 1666, it was torn down under Abbot Gallus Alt to make way for a new residence.

The Hofflügel was rebuilt in its current form in 1666. After its completion, it housed the chambers of the Abbot. The courtyard chapel and the underlying Gallus Chapel on the ground floor were consecrated in 1671.

From 1767 to 1769, the Abbot had the Neue Pfalz built as a new, more appropriate residence. The hundred-year-old Hofflügel became the southern wing of this new residence, while the planned northern wing opposite it could only be realized as the canton's arsenal after the dissolution of the monastery and the Abbey. In 1803, the Neue Pfalz became the seat of the government of the Canton of St. Gallen. In 1805, the Canton liquidated the St. Gallen Monastery, and the monastery buildings came into state ownership, with the Hofflügel being rented to a cotton spinning mill. After the establishment of the Diocese of St. Gallen, the Catholics of the Canton of St. Gallen repurchased the Hofflügel in 1823 for a sum of 38,000 Gulden. The building became the episcopal residence of the Diocese, which was founded in 1823 and became independent in April 1847. The lower Gallus Chapel now serves as the baptismal chapel of the cathedral parish.

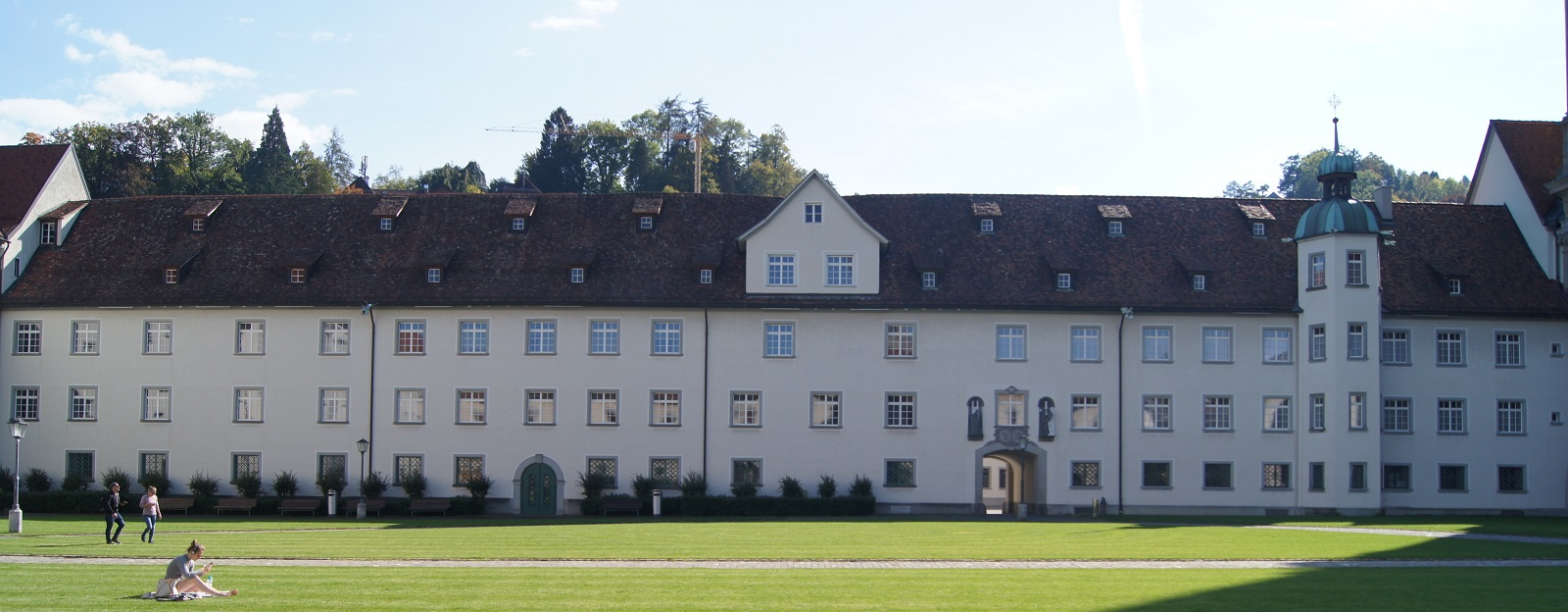
General view from the north

Under the Hofflügel is the historic Hofkeller, which has been connected to the modern Pfalzkeller since 1998/1999 through an entrance structure designed by the Spanish architect Santiago Calatrava. Both cellars are used for events.

== Architecture ==
Hofflügel is a three-story, simple building with 22 window bays. The window frames are unadorned. In the western section, there is a four-story tower with a bell in the spire. The simple roof is articulated by a single dormer.

Access is provided through an entrance structure by Calatrava, whose metal slats can be folded flat to the ground. However, this structure is located in front of the Neue Pfalz.
