= Saint Gallen Group =

Former informal annual conference of liberal Catholic prelates

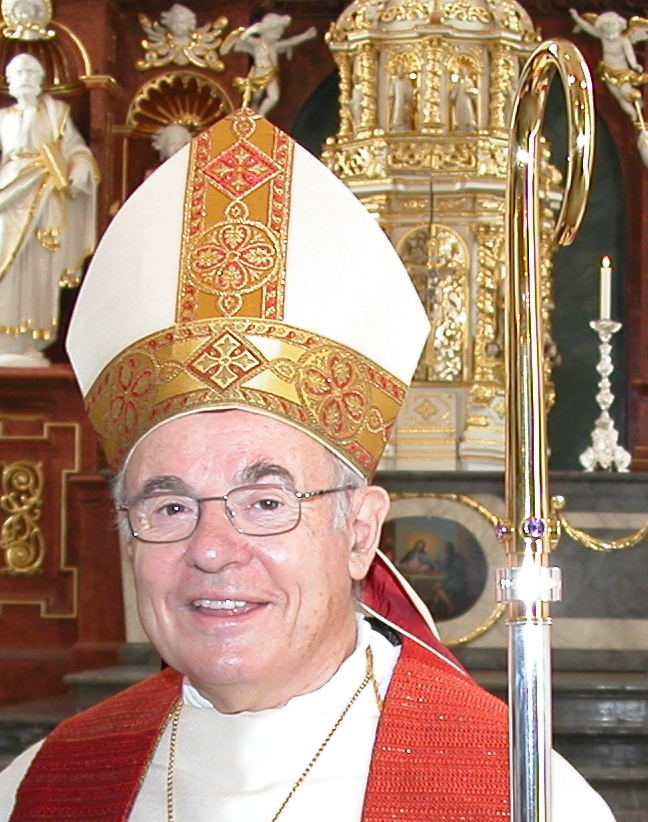
Bishop Ivo Fürer, the group's host

The Saint Gallen Group, also called the Saint Gallen Mafia, was an informal group of high ranking, like-minded liberal/reformist clerics in the Catholic Church. These were described by the Bishop of Saint Gallen, Ivo Fürer, the host of these discussions, as a Freundeskreis ('circle of friends') who met annually in or near St. Gallen, Switzerland in January, to freely exchange ideas on issues in the Church.

== Name ==
The group being informal, it had no official name. "Group of St. Gallen" is what some of its members called it in their agendas, and the name has become public after a full chapter devoted to it in the biography of Cardinal Godfried Danneels, published by Church historians Karim Schelkens and Jürgen Mettepenningen. "St. Gallen Group", "St. Gallen Mafia" and "St. Gallen Club" are alternative names.

In the chapter devoted to the group, Danneels's biographers did not mention the word 'mafia' once. However, at the presentation of the biography in September 2015, which was televised by VTM, Danneels said in Dutch that the name "Group of St. Gallen" was "deftig" (dignified, respectable), "but actually we said of ourselves and of that group: the mafia".

== History ==
=== Background ===
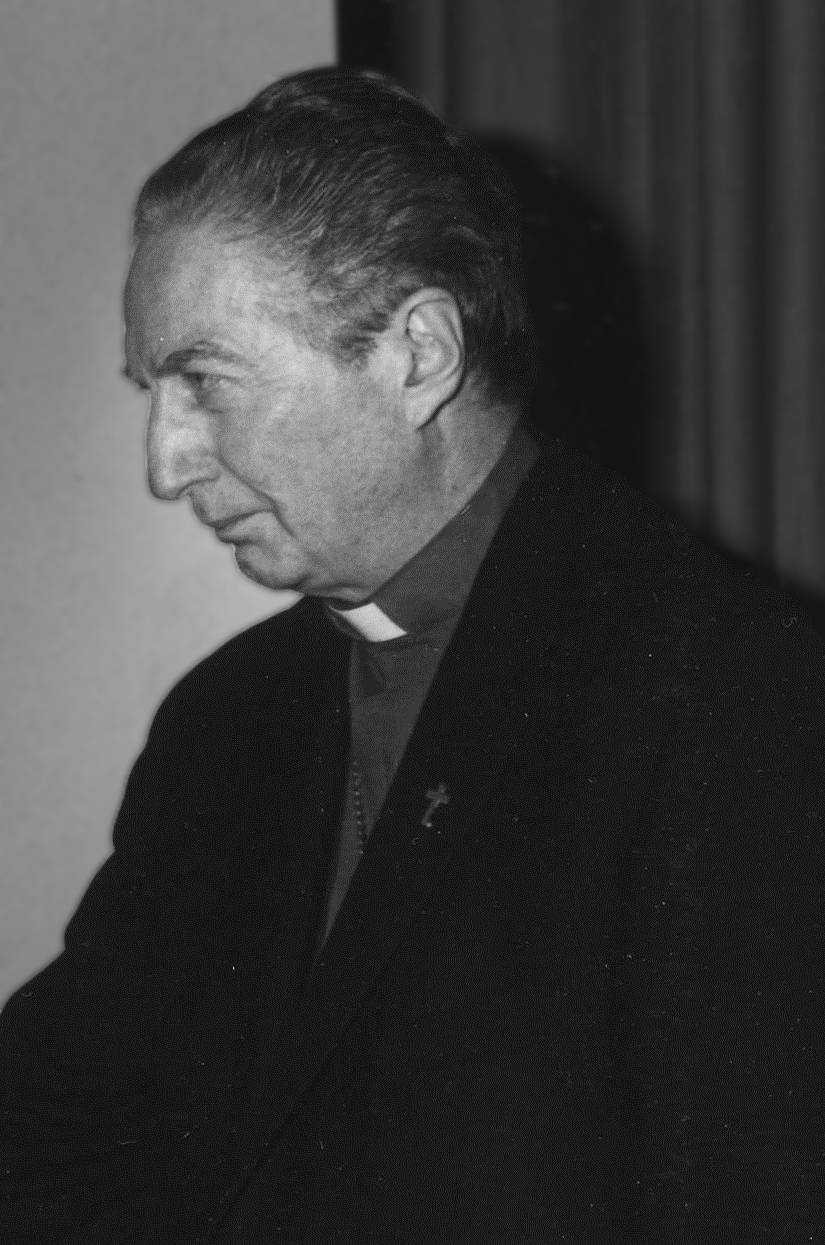
Cardinal Martini, the driving force of the Saint Gallen Group in its first years

The impetus for the discussions came from Bishop Ivo Fürer, who had been the secretary-general of the Council of the Bishops' Conferences of Europe from 1977 until 1995. When in 1993 the Vatican imposed a thorough reform of this council, Fürer was one of the members who felt that this meant the end of the main raison d'être of the council, viz. fostering collegiality among European bishops. In consultation with Cardinal Carlo Maria Martini, he decided to invite a group of cardinals, archbishops and bishops for frank, collegial discussions among themselves.

=== Attendance ===
When the group met for the first time in January 1996, Fürer invited Martini; Paul Verschuren, Bishop of Helsinki; Jean Vilnet, Archbishop of Lille; Johann Weber, Bishop of Graz-Seckau; Walter Kasper, Bishop of Rottenburg-Stuttgart (later Cardinal), and Karl Lehmann, Bishop of Mainz (later Cardinal).

New members, all joining by invitation and all "open-minded" were:

- 1999: Cardinal Godfried Danneels, Archbishop of Mechelen-Brussels and Ad van Luyn, Bishop of Rotterdam
- 2001: Cormac Murphy-O'Connor, Archbishop of Westminster (later Cardinal), and Joseph Doré, Archbishop of Strasbourg
- 2002: Alois Kothgasser, Bishop of Innsbruck, later archbishop of Salzburg
- 2003: Achille Silvestrini, a Curia cardinal, and Cardinal Lubomyr Husar, Major Archbishop of Lviv and Metropolitan of Galicia in the Ukrainian Greek Catholic Church
- 2004: José Policarpo, Patriarch of Lisbon (in 2004).

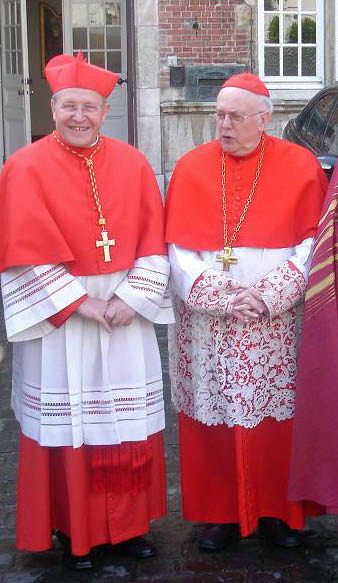
Cardinals Walter Kasper and Godfried Danneels, two prominent members of the Saint Gallen Group

Whilst in Rome before the 2005 papal conclave, the cardinals who were members of the Saint Gallen Group sent their host Ivo Fürer a card saying: "We are here together in the spirit of Saint Gallen", and before the conclave they came together for a talk over dinner. According to diary excerpts of an anonymous cardinal, Lehmann and Danneels were "the thinking core" of the reformisti during the conclave. These reformisti did not want to vote for Joseph Ratzinger, and tried to prevent his election by giving all their votes to Jorge Mario Bergoglio, who thus might achieve a blocking minority. They succeeded, but Bergoglio, "almost in tears", begged not to be elected. Ratzinger was elected Pope Benedict XVI.

The year after Ratzinger's election, what remained of the group met for the last time. The gathering was attended by just four members: Fürer, Kothgasser, Danneels and van Luyn.

Three of the remaining members, however, participated in the 2013 papal conclave: Walter Kasper, Godfried Danneels and Karl Lehmann. Cormac Murphy-O'Connor was too old to participate in the conclave, but he was present in Rome during the pre-conclave period. Unlike in 2005, there is no anonymous source to report from within the conclave on what role they played in the election of Pope Francis. According to Austen Ivereigh, the four worked in concert to advocate the election of Jorge Mario Bergoglio at the conclave, still hoping to elect a more modern leader for the Church. Also, in the first edition of his book, Ivereigh writes that "they first secured Bergoglio's assent". All four cardinals, however, denied this.

The director of the Holy See Press Office said the cardinals were "surprised and disappointed" at what was written about them and that they "expressly denied this description of events ... with regard to the conduct of a campaign for [Bergoglio's] election". The strong pushback from the cardinals was primarily due to the implication that they had broken the rules set forth in para. 82 of Universi Dominici gregis, which governs the conclave, and therefore excommunicated latae sententiae. In the second edition of his book, Ivereigh bolstered the cardinal's defensive positioning by replacing the phrase with: "In keeping with conclave rules, they did not ask him if he would be willing to be a candidate." But he stood by the rest of his reporting.

== Secrecy ==
The founders and members of the group felt that the Holy See impeded free discussion among bishops, so meetings were held in secrecy. Members observed "a simple rule: everything could be said, no notes were taken and discretion was observed."

The Saint Gallen Group and their gatherings were revealed by Ivereigh after these had ceased to exist in 2014, and were described more extensively in Danneels's 2015 authorized biography.

== Issues and persons discussed ==
The issues discussed by the group included centralism in the Church, the role of the bishops' conferences, the role and position of priests, sexual morality, the nomination of bishops and collegiality. On all these issues, the Vatican had published documents which the participants found controversial.

All agreed that the prefect of the Congregation for the Doctrine of the Faith, Joseph Ratzinger, was a centralizing and conservative influence in Rome, especially as Pope John Paul II declined in health.

Some members deny that they discussed other names, but Fürer contradicts them, and explicitly states that Jorge Mario Bergoglio's was mentioned in the group's discussion on the impending election of a successor to John Paul II. He adds, however, that the members never committed themselves on any candidate. Bergoglio's name, however, could only have come up in Saint Gallen at the 2002 meeting. Bergoglio was only created a cardinal in February 2001, and Martini, who had met him in 1974, introduced him to some members, who knew him barely or not at all, at the extraordinary papal consistory of May 2001. Cardinal Bergoglio did not like the way the Curia ran things, and his report on the 2001 bishops' synod earned him praise from much of the hierarchy, including those of the Saint Gallen Group.

== See also ==
- Catholic Church in Switzerland
- Universi Dominici gregis
- Council of the Bishops' Conferences of Europe (CCEE)
- Pact of the Catacombs
- Alta Vendita
- Squadrone Volante
