= List of Swiss cardinals =

This is a list of cardinals from Switzerland, or of Swiss ancestry.

== Cardinals ==
=== 16th century ===
- Matthäus Schiner (1511–1522)

=== 19th century ===
- Gaspard Mermillod (1890–1892)

=== 20th century ===
- Charles Journet (1965–1975)
- Benno Gut (1967–1970)
- Henri Schwery (1991–2021)
- Gilberto Agustoni (1994–2017)

=== 21st century ===
- Georges Cottier (2003–2016)
- Kurt Koch (2010–present)
- Emil Paul Tscherrig (2023–2026)

== Pseudocardinals ==
- Jean de Neufchâtel (1383-1398)
- François de Meez (1440-1444)
