= Beat Grögli =

21st-century Swiss Roman Catholic priest

The Most Reverend Beat Grögli
- Bishop of St. Gallen
- Church: Catholic Church
- Diocese: St. Gallen
- Elected: 20 May 2025
- Predecessor: Markus Büchel

Orders
- Ordination: 16 August 1998 by Ivo Fürer
- Consecration: 5 July 2025 by Markus Büchel

Personal details
- Born: 20 September 1970 (age 55) Wil, St. Gallen, Switzerland
- Motto: Latin: In concordiam Christi, lit. 'Toward the harmony of Christ'
- Coat of arms

Beat Grögli (born 20 September 1970) is a Swiss Roman Catholic prelate, serving as the bishop of the Diocese of Saint Gallen and the apostolic administrator of Appenzell since 2025.

== Life ==
Grögli was born in Wil on 20 September 1970, the eldest of three boys born to Anton and Rita Grögli-Büeler. After his early schooling in Wil, he spent three years as a boarder at the Untere Waid Gymnasium in Mörschwil. He graduated from the Friedberg Gymnasium in Gossau in 1991 and then interned for a year at a social education facility for children and young people in Lucerne. From 1992 to 1997 he studied philosophy and theology at the University of Fribourg and University of Innsbruck as well as psychology at the Pontifical Gregorian University in Rome. He was ordained a priest of the Diocese of Saint Gallen by Bishop Ivo Fürer in St. Gallen Cathedral on 16 August 1998.

Grögli served as vicar of St. Otmar parish in St. Gallen from 1998 to 2003 and then undertook additional training in psychology at the Gregorian from 2003 to 2006. Returning to Switzerland, he worked from 2006 to 2013 in the parishes of Rotmonten and Heiligkreuz, and part-time in the interdiocesan program in Chur. In 2013, Bishop Markus Büchel named him a member of the cathedral chapter and cathedral priest, and he joined the diocesan leadership team. In 2018, the role of dean for pastoral care was added to his responsibilities.

The cathedral chapter of the diocese elected Grögli bishop (Note: An 1845 pact between the Holy See and the Swiss government controls the process for filling the position of Bishop of St. Gallen.) on 20 May 2025, (Note: The election was originally scheduled for late April but was postponed because of the death of Pope Francis.) and on 22 May Pope Leo XIV appointed him bishop of St. Gallen, a position which entails as well the responsibilities of apostolic administrator of the two semi-cantons of Appenzell. The Neue Zürcher Zeitung described him as "an unknown quantity" with respect to current Church issues, but thought to be "in the moderate camp".

Grögli received his episcopal consecration on 5 July 2025 from Bishop Markus Büchel, his predecessor in St. Gallen, and became the youngest bishop in Switzerland.

== Views ==
In May 2025, Grögli expressed optimism about the eventual ordination of women, without advocating for the practice. As bishop-elect, he affirmed that although he considered the theological arguments against the ordination of women to be "weak", he nevertheless recognized that the wider issue was "complex" and emphasised his loyalty to Rome.

In a personal statement after his election, Grögli expressed his support for synodality in the Catholic Church. In a July 2025 interview, he said he was willing to bless same-sex couples, stating that a blessing is "not a church political manifestation". He also expressed disapproval of the Tridentine Mass as "not evolving" and that groups which celebrate it in his diocese (namely the SSPX) have "separated themselves from the larger community". At the same time, he has noted his appreciation for Eastern Rite liturgies, saying that it takes him "into another dimension" despite the language barrier.

Grögli has a special devotion to Ignatius of Loyola and to the Basilica of Santa Maria in Trastevere in Rome.
