= Saint Othmar =

Saint Othmar (or Otmar) O.S.B.
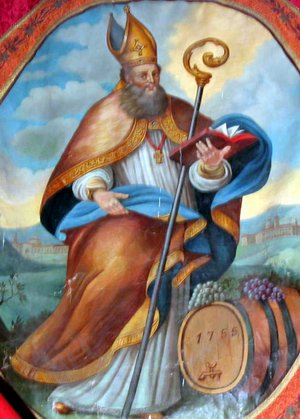

Missionary
- Born: c. 689 supposedly near Saint Gallen, now in Switzerland
- Died: c. 759 (aged 69-70); Werd Island, Lake Constance, now in Switzerland
- Venerated in: Roman Catholic Church, Eastern Orthodox Church
- Canonized: 864, Constance, now in Germany by Solomon I, Bishop of Constance
- Major shrine: Saint Gallen
- Feast: 16 November
- Attributes: Crozier and wine barrel
- Patronage: City of Saint Gall (together with Saint Gallus)

Othmar, (also Audomar, c. 689 – c. 759) was a Medieval monk and priest. He served as the first abbot of the Abbey of St. Gall, a Benedictine monastery near where the city of St. Gallen, now in Switzerland, developed.

== Life ==
Othmar was of Alemannic descent, received his education at the cathedral school in Chur in Rhaetia. He was ordained priest, and for a time presided over a church of St. Florinus in Rhaetia. This church was probably identical with the one of St. Peter at Remus, where Florinus had laboured as a priest and was buried.

In 720 Waltram of Thurgau appointed Othmar superior over the cell of St. Gall and custodian of Gall's relics. Othmar united into a monastery the monks that lived about the cell of St. Gall, according to the Rule of St. Columban, and became their first abbot. He added a hospital and a school, which became the foundation upon which the famous Stiftsbibliothek (Monastery library) was built.

In 747, as a part of the reform movement of Church institutions in Alamannia, he introduced the Benedictine Rule, which was to remain in effect until the secularization and closure of the monastery in 1805. Othmar also provided for the needs of the surrounding community, building an almshouse as well as the first leprosarium in what is now Switzerland, as well as others in France and Germany.

When Carloman renounced his throne in 747, he visited Othmar at St. Gall and gave him a letter to his brother Pepin, recommending Othmar and his monastery to the king's liberality. Othmar personally brought the letter to Pepin, and was kindly received.

In 759, Counts Warin and Ruodhart tried to gain possession of some property belonging to St. Gall, Othmar fearlessly resisted their demands. Hereupon they captured him while he was on a journey to Constance, and held him prisoner, first at the castle of Bodmann, then on the island of Werd in the Rhine. At the latter place he died, after an imprisonment of six months, and was buried.

== Veneration ==
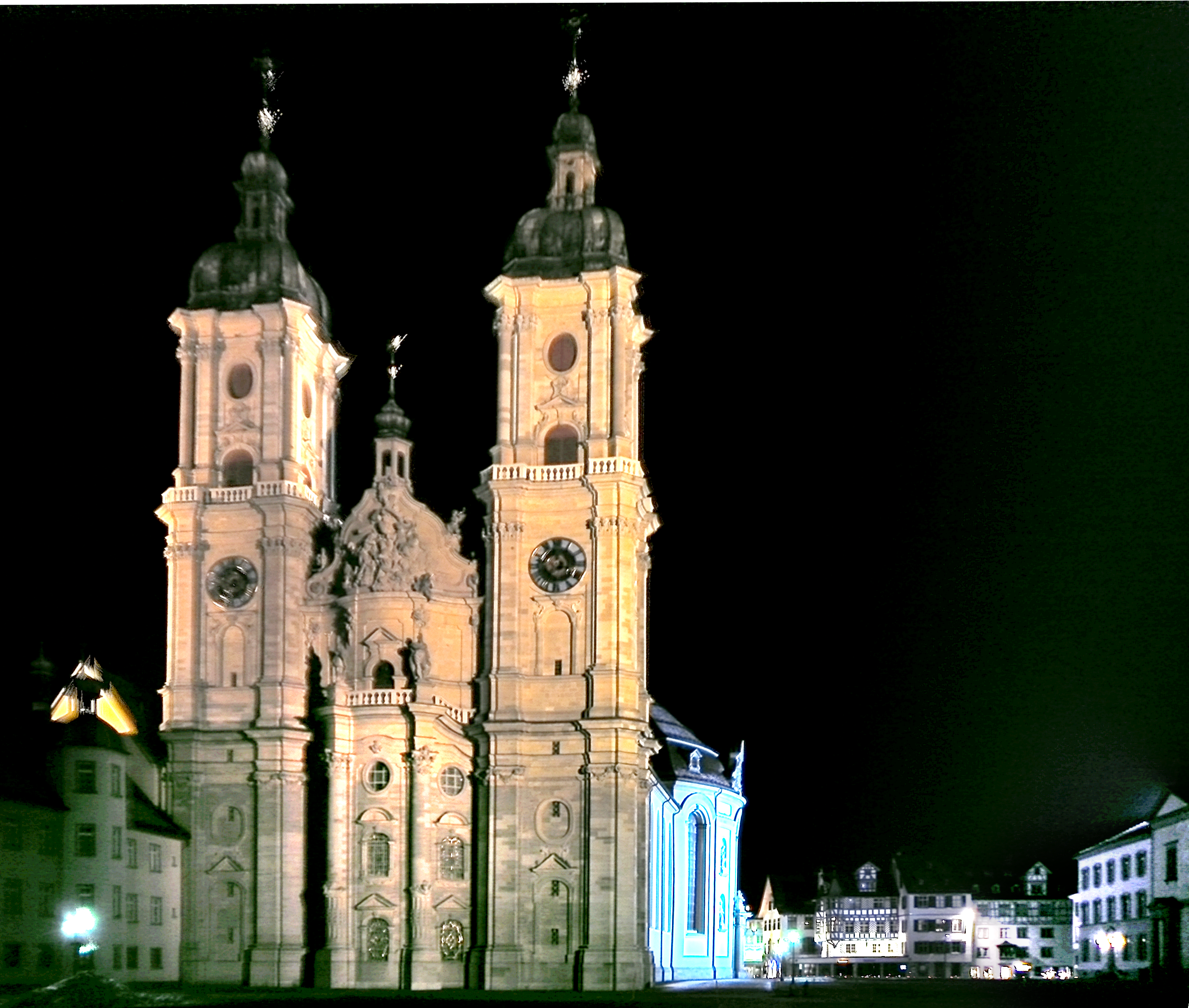
Collegiate Church of St. Gall and Othmar

Othmar's cult began to spread soon after his death, and next to Maurice and Gall, he is one of the most popular saint in Switzerland. In 769 his body was transferred to the monastery of St. Gall. As the weather was very hot, when the men rowed his body over the lake, they became extremely thirsty. Legends say that the only barrel of wine they had left did not become empty, regardless of how much they drank. Therefore, the wine barrel became one of his attributes.

His cult was officially recognized in 864 by Solomon I (bishop of Constance). In 867 he was solemnly entombed in the new church of St. Othmar at St. Gall. His feast is celebrated on 16 November. He is represented in art as a Benedictine abbot, generally holding a little barrel in his hand, an allusion to the alleged miracle, that a barrel of Othmar never became empty, no matter how much he took from it to give to the poor.

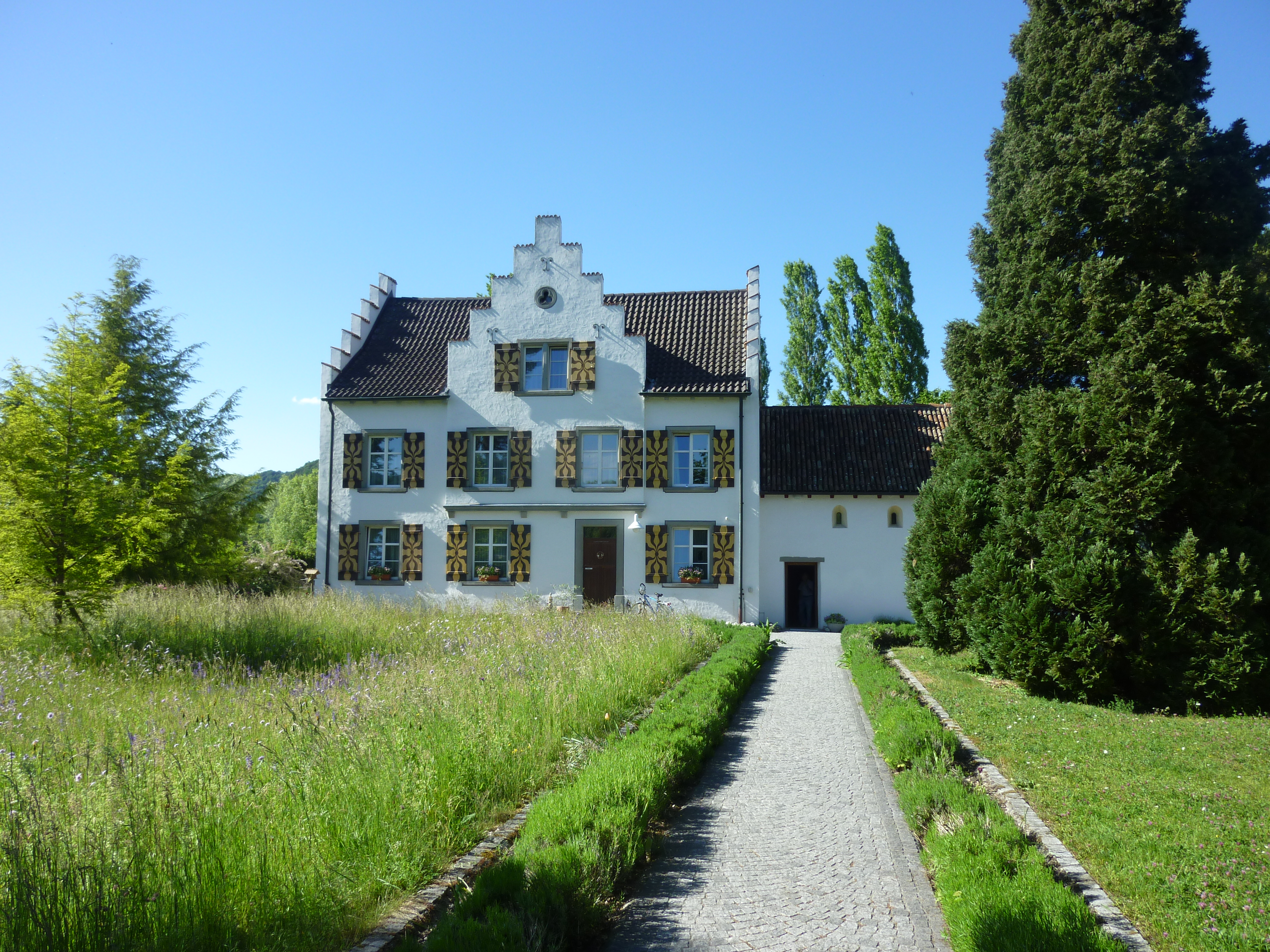
Werdinsel Kapelle

== Legacy ==
St. Gallen Cathedral is dedicated to Gall and Othmar. In the 10th century, St. Othmar chapel on Werd island was erected in his memory.

There is a church named for St. Othmar in Mödling, Austria. The Pro-Cathedral of St. Mary in Bismarck, North Dakota holds a reliquary containing some relics of St. Othmar.

The Swiss team handball club TSV St. Otmar St. Gallen is named after him.
