= Markus Büchel (bishop) =

Swiss Roman Catholic bishop

- Bishop Emeritus of Saint Gallen
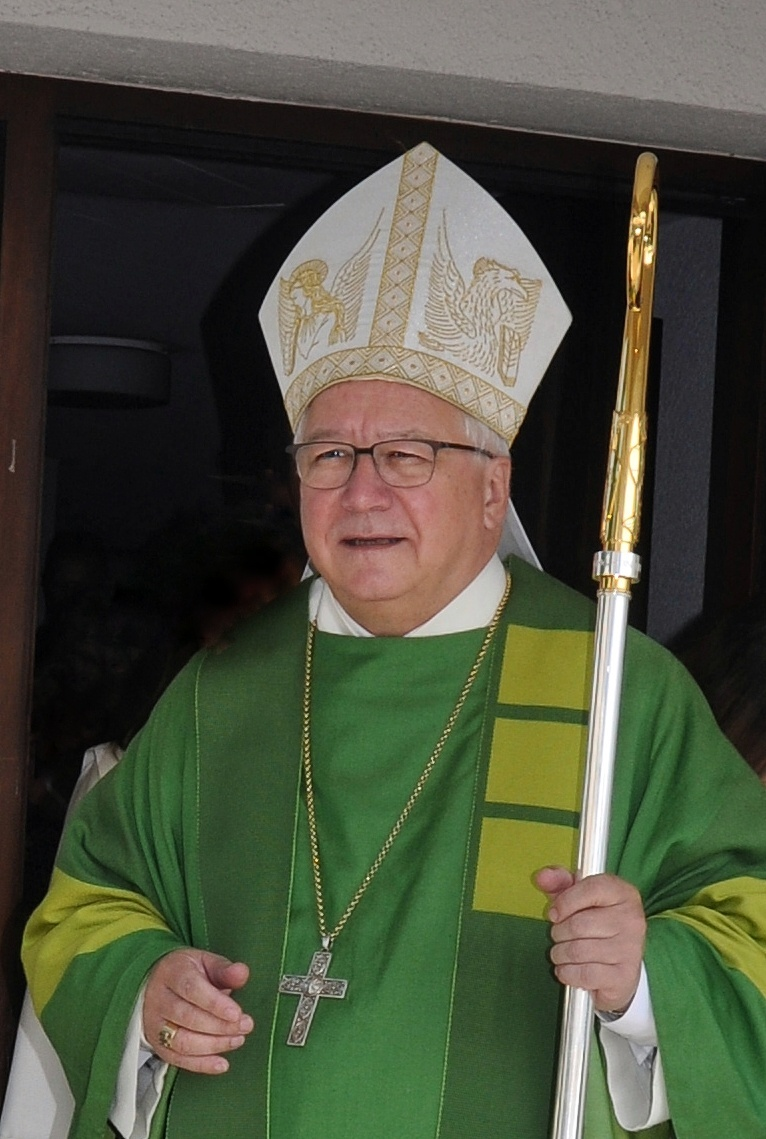
- Church: Catholic Church
- Diocese: Diocese of Saint Gallen
- In office: 6 July 2006 – 22 May 2025
- Predecessor: Ivo Fürer
- Successor: Beat Grögli

Orders
- Ordination: 3 April 1976 by Joseph Hasler
- Consecration: 17 September 2006 by Ivo Fürer

Personal details
- Born: 9 August 1949 (age 76) Rüthi, Canton of St. Gallen, Switzerland

Markus Büchel (German pronunciation: [ˈmaʁkʊs ˈbyːçl̩]; born 9 August 1949 in Rüthi) is a Swiss Catholic prelate who served as Bishop of Saint Gallen from 2006 to 2025.

== Life ==
Büchel studied philosophy and Roman Catholic theology at University of Fribourg. He was ordained priest in St. Gallen on 3 April 1976. On 17 September 2006 Büchel was ordained bishop of Roman Catholic Diocese of Saint Gallen by Ivo Fürer.

In March 2025, Büchel voiced his support for the ordination of women in order to combat the shortage of priests in the diocese.

Pope Leo XIV accepted his resignation on 22 May 2025.
