= Gall Morel =

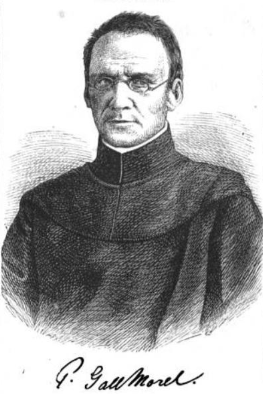

Gall Morel, O.S.B., was a poet, scholar, aesthete, and educationist, born at St. Gallen, Switzerland, on 24 March 1803; died at the Abbey of Einsiedeln on 16 December 1872.

== Biography ==
Benedict Morel was born on 24 March 1803 in St. Gallen, Switzerland. In 1814, he entered the gymnasium in his hometown. A pilgrimage to Einsiedeln in 1817 influenced him deeply, and afterwards he entered the monastery school as a novice, where he took the name of Gall. In 1820 he took the final vows, and after several years spent in theological and philosophical studies, was ordained priest in 1826, being appointed forthwith instructor in the monastery school. From 1826 to 1832 he was professor of rhetoric, and until 1835 he lectured on philosophy. In this latter year he became librarian of the abbey, and retained this office to the end of his life, while also fulfilling the offices of choral director (1835–40), prefect (1836), and rector (1848) of the abbey school, archivist of the abbey (1839–45), counsellor of education of the Canton Schwyz (1843–5), and subprior of the abbey (1846–52).

Morel, an aestheticist, made repeated art journeys to Munich, Vienna, Venice, Milan, Rome, and Paris. He considered the prime object of aesthetics to be the reconstruction of creation. He was also an accomplished violinist, and considered music an important branch of aesthetics.

== Works ==
Morel is best known for his ten volumes of lyric, didactic, and dramatic verse. It has been said that in his poems, "he shows himself now as a childlike pious monk, now as a good-natured humorist, now a man fully conversant with worldly affairs, and often as a keen satirist, forceful and epigrammatic in expression."

Under Morel's care, the library of Einsiedeln was enriched in thirty-seven years by more than 26,000 volumes; the manuscripts he obtained include a 10th-century manuscript of Horace, rescued by Morel from the binding of books, and named after him Codex Morellianus. Drawing on these books, Morel published the Lateinische Hymnen des Mittelalters, Offenbarungen der Schwester Mechtild von Magdeburg, and other works.

Morel produced a number of compilations and catalogues, including the Regesten der Archive der schweizerischen Eidgenossenschaft'and the Regesta of the Benedictine Abbey of Einsiedeln. He was associate founder of the Swiss Society for Historical Research (1840), and wrote many contributions for its Archiv. He likewise assisted in the formation of Verein der fünf alten Orte and was a contributor to its organ, the Geschichts-freund.

=== Drama ===
Under Morel's stewardship, the Klosterschule grew to become a significant institution. Morel worked to foster school drama there, including the publication of two volumes entitled Jugend- und Schultheater. His only original dramatic work is the comedy Der Franzos im Ybrig (also known as Chevreau oder die Franzosen in Jberg), written at the age of 21 (in 1824) in the course of three or four days. The subject of the play is an invalid soldier of the French invasion of Switzerland of 1798 who experiences the rather inexpert preparations for national defence on the part of the population of Iberg.

The play was an immediate success and widely performed, to the discomfort of its author often supplemented by rude or indecent additions, especially since the play remained unprinted and was spread by manual copying of the text. The first printed edition appeared only in 1917, edited by P. Leonard Hugener in order to "prevent further disfigurement" of the piece, the original text approximated by critical comparison of extant manuscripts. An adaptation of the play was published in 1895 by Meinrad Lienert, and an extended play loosely based on Morel was published in 1991 by Thomas Hürlimann.

Morel was referred to as the "likely most universal spirit of the Einsiedeln Abbey" and by Karl Johann Greith, "Father Gall Morel was a living vindication of the monastic and cloistered life against the attacks of misunderstanding and prejudice."
