= Thiota =

Christian false prophetess

Thiota (German pronunciation: [ˈtjo:ta]; fl. 847 AD) was a Christian woman and false prophetess of the ninth century convicted of heresy. She was originally from Alemannia (then part of East Francia), and in 847 she began prophesying that the world would end that year.

Her story is known from the Annales Fuldenses which record that she disturbed the diocese of Bishop Salomon, that is, the Diocese of Constance, before arriving in Mainz. A large number of people were persuaded by her words, as well as even some clerics. In fear, many gave her gifts and sought prayers. Finally, the bishops of Gallia Belgica ordered her to attend a synod in St Alban's church in Mainz. She was eventually forced to confess that she had made up her predictions at the urging of a priest and for lucrative gain. She was publicly flogged and stripped of her ministry, which the Fuldensian annalist says she had taken up "unreasonably ... against the customs of the church"–possibly a reference to her being a woman who claimed religious authority for herself. Ashamed, she ceased to prophesy thereafter.
