= Solomon I (bishop of Constance) =

German bishop

Solomon (or Salomon) I (died 871) was the Bishop of Constance from an unknown date between 835 and 847 until his death. He was the first of an "episcopal dynasty" which ruled Constance until 919 and briefly held the Diocese of Freising from 884 until 906 and that of Chur from 913 until 949.

In 847, his diocese was the first to be disturbed by the preachings of a false prophetess named Thiota. She was condemned at a synod in Mainz later that year and ceased to be a problem thereafter.

Solomon attended the synod of Worms (868).

== Sources ==
- The Annals of Fulda. (Manchester Medieval series, Ninth-Century Histories, Volume II.) Reuter, Timothy (trans.) Manchester: Manchester University Press, 1992.
