= Norbert Brunner (bishop) =

Swiss Catholic prelate

His Excellency Norbert Brunner
- Bishop Emeritus of Sion
- Church: Roman Catholic
- Diocese: Diocese of Sion
- Appointed: 1 April 1995
- Installed: 9 June 1995
- Term ended: 8 July 2014
- Predecessor: Henri Schwery
- Successor: Jean-Marie Lovey

Orders
- Ordination: 6 July 1968
- Consecration: 9 June 1995 by Henri Schwery

Personal details
- Born: 21 June 1942 (age 83) Naters Switzerland
- Coat of arms

Norbert Brunner (born 21 June 1942) is a Swiss prelate of the Roman Catholic Church. He served as Bishop of the Roman Catholic Diocese of Sion in Switzerland from 1995 to 2014. He was the elected President of the Swiss Bishops Conference for the term 2010–2012.

== Biography ==
Brunner was born 1942 in Naters, Valais. He studied at the University of Innsbruck, Austria, and was ordained to the Catholic priesthood on July 6, 1968.

His resignation as Bishop of Sion was accepted, in accordance with Canon 401.2 of the 1983 Latin rite Code of Canon Law, by Pope Francis on Tuesday, July 8, 2014, and that same day, Pope Francis named the Right Reverend Abbot Jean-Marie Lovey c.r.b, then the Provost (Superior General) of the Congregation of Canons Regular of St. Bernard the Great, as Brunner's successor.

== Views ==
In November 2009, he declared that he was in favor of the ordination of married priests, and that most Swiss Bishops shared his view.

During a Synod, Bishop Brunner insisted that the measures taken at Vatican II to promote collegiality still had not found their objective. Once again, he said with preoccupation, "what value do the pastoral needs of the local churches have for the Roman Curia?"

Brunner wrote about the canonical situation of the Society of St. Pius X and concluded that the 1988 consecrations were valid but illicit, in the sense that Lefebvre did consecrate bishops but that these consecrations were against existing canonical norms.

Catholic Church titles
Preceded by Henri Schwery	Bishop of Sion; 1995—2014	Succeeded by Jean-Marie Lovey, CRB
Preceded by Kurt Koch	President of the Swiss Episcopal Conference; 2010—present	Incumbent
