= Council of the Bishops' Conferences of Europe =

Conference of the presidents of the Catholic episcopal conferences of Europe

- Consilium Conferentiarium Episcoporum Europae
- Abbreviation: CCEE
- Formation: 1971; 55 years ago
- Purpose: Collaboration between the European episcopal conferences
- Headquarters: St. Gallen, Switzerland
- Coordinates: 47.42285°N 9.37356°E
- Region served: Europe
- Members: 39 Catholic bishops
- President: Archbishop Gintaras Grušas
- Main organ: Conference
- Website: www.ccee.eu

The Council of the Bishops' Conferences of Europe (Latin: Consilium Conferentiarum Episcoporum Europae; CCEE) is a conference of the presidents of the 33 Roman Catholic episcopal conferences of Europe, the Archbishop of Luxembourg, the Archbishop of Monaco, Maronite Catholic Archeparch of Cyprus, the Roman Catholic Bishop of Chişinău, the Ruthenian Catholic Eparch of Mukacheve, and the Apostolic Administrator of Estonia.

The president is Archbishop Gintaras Grušas, Archbishop of Vilnius. The vice-presidents are Cardinal Jean-Claude Hollerich, Archbishop of Luxembourg, and Cardinal László Német, Archbishop of Belgrade. The general secretary of the CCEE is Father Antonio Ammirati.

The offices of the CCEE Secretariat are located in St. Gallen, Switzerland.

== Presidents ==
- 1971–1979: Roger Etchegaray, Archbishop of Marseille
- 1979–1986: Basil Hume, Archbishop of Westminster
- 1986–1993: Carlo Maria Martini, Archbishop of Milan
- 1993–2001: Miloslav Vlk, Archbishop of Prague
- 2001–2006: Amédée Grab, Bishop of Chur
- 2006–2016: Péter Erdő, Archbishop of Esztergom-Budapest
- 2016–2021: Angelo Bagnasco, Archbishop of Genoa
- 2021: Gintaras Grušas, Archbishop of Vilnius

== Conferences ==
1. Episcopal Conference of Albania
2. Episcopal Conference of Austria
3. Episcopal Conference of Belarus
4. Episcopal Conference of Belgium
5. Episcopal Conference of Bosnia and Herzegovina
6. Episcopal Conference of Bulgaria
7. Episcopal Conference of Croatia
8. Episcopal Conference of the Czech Republic
9. Episcopal Conference of England and Wales
10. Episcopal Conference of Ireland
11. Episcopal Conference of Germany
12. Holy Synod of Catholic Bishops of Greece
13. Episcopal Conference of Hungary
14. Episcopal Conference of France
15. Episcopal Conference of Italy
16. Episcopal Conference of Malta
17. Episcopal Conference of the Netherlands
18. Episcopal Conference of Poland
19. Episcopal Conference of Portugal
20. Episcopal Conference of Romania
21. Episcopal Conference of Scandinavia
22. Episcopal Conference of Scotland
23. Episcopal Conference of Slovakia
24. Episcopal Conference of Slovenia
25. Episcopal Conference of Spain
26. Swiss Bishop's Conference
27. Episcopal Conference of Ukraine
28. Episcopal Conference of Latvia
29. Episcopal Conference of Lithuania
30. Episcopal Conference of Russia
31. Episcopal Conference of Turkey
32. International Bishops' Conference of Saints Cyril and Methodius (Serbia, Kosovo, Montenegro, and North Macedonia)

== General Secretaries ==
- 1971–1977: Fr. Alojzij Šuštar
- 1977–1995: Fr. Ivo Fürer
- 1995–2008: Fr. Aldo Giordano
- 2008–2018: Fr. Duarte da Cunha
- 2018–2024: Fr. Martin Michalíček
- 2024: Fr. Antonio Ammirati

== See also ==
- Catholic Church in Europe
- List of Catholic dioceses in Europe
