= St. Gallus Chapel (Saint Gall) =

Chapel within Saint Gall abbey complex

Coordinates: 47°25′23″N 9°22′40″E

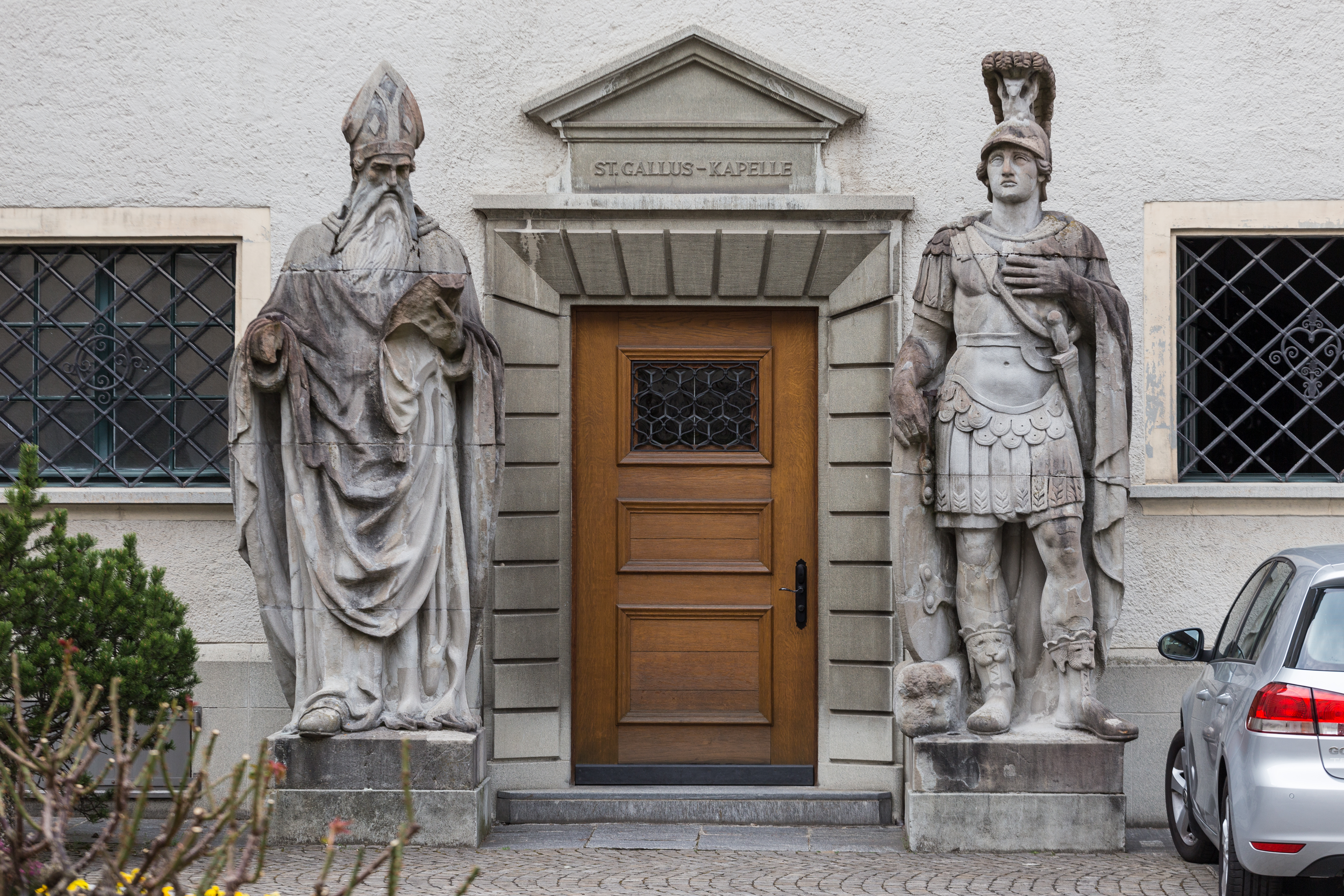
Entrance to the St. Gallus chapel with statues of Desiderius of Vienne and Saint Maurice

The St. Gallus Chapel is a chapel within the abbey complex of Saint Gall.

It was rebuilt in 1666/67 on the ground floor of the residence of the prince-abbot. It was consecrated in 1671 in conjunction with the Bishop's chapel (German: Bischofskapelle) above it.

The chapel has an approximately square interior. The walls and ceiling are filled with 26 paintings depicting the life of saint Gall, presumably created by Johann Sebastian Hersche. There are two larger than life size statues next to the entrance, depicting Saint Maurice and Desiderius of Vienne.

In the year 971, the Abbot Purchart von Udalrichingen had a chapel built in the same spot. Purchart was buried next to its entrance in 975 by the bishop Conrad of Constance.

The St. Gallus Chapel, along with the St. Gallen Cathedral, serves as a baptistery of the St. Gallen Cathedral parish.

== See also ==
- List of sacred buildings in the city of St. Gallen (in German)]
