= Council of Mainz (847) =

A synod of the ecclesiastical province of Mainz was held in Mainz in early October 847. It was attended by all the suffragan bishops of Mainz except the bishop of Strasbourg. It was convoked on the orders of King Louis the German and Archbishop Hrabanus Maurus presided. It was the first church council held in the kingdom of East Francia.

The council's 31 acts or canons are preserved along with a cover letter written by Hrabanus. Addressing to the king, Hrabanus demonstrates the loyalty of the church following a period of civil war. He ordered the bishops, abbots, monks and priests of his province to celebrate 3,500 Masses and recite 1,700 Psalters for the souls of Louis and his family.

Many of the canons adopted by the council were lifted directly from the acts of the Council of Mainz of 813, the last council under Charlemagne. Some bear the mark of Hrabanus's thinking, as seen in his penitential. The issues of baptism, penance, public peace, tithes, the care for the poor, the rights and privileges of the church and the rights and duties of it officers were perennial. A new issue was that the synod dealt with was the violence and gluttony of the laity, especially the aristocracy. There had been a rise in wandering gangs engaged in violence, perhaps as a result of the civil war. The council outlined stricter rules of penance for laymen guilty of murder. In canon 2, it decreed that preaching was to be done in the vernacular Germanic and Romance languages. In canon 5, it forbade any sworn association against the king, the church or "the powers of the state established in any way by legitimate arrangement". It enjoined the king to defend the church like Constantine the Great and to order monks to abide by the Benedictine rule.

According to the Annals of Fulda, the prophetess Thiota was brought before the bishops in Saint Alban's Abbey on the occasion of the synod and condemned. According to the Life of Anskar, the council agreed to permit the king to appoint Anskar, already archbishop of Hamburg, to the vacant suffragan diocese of Bremen and to hold them simultaneously on account of the devastation suffered in Hamburg. Anskar was permitted to reside in Bremen.

== Works cited ==
- Coon, Lynda L. (2011). Dark Age Bodies: Gender and Monastic Practice in the Early Medieval West. University of Pennsylvania Press.
- Gillis, Matthew Bryan (2017). Heresy and Dissent in the Carolingian Empire: The Case of Gottschalk of Orbais. Oxford University Press.
- Goldberg, Eric J. (2006). Struggle for Empire: Kingship and Conflict under Louis the German, 817–876. Cornell University Press.
- Pixton, Paul B. (1995). The German Episcopacy and the Implementation of the Decrees of the Fourth Lateran Council, 1216–1245: Watchmen on the Tower. E. J. Brill. ISBN 9789004102620.
- Reuter, Timothy, ed. (1992). The Annals of Fulda. Manchester University Press.
- Robinson, Charles H., ed. (1921). Anskar, the Apostle of the North, 801–865. The Society for the Propagation of the Gospel in Foreign Parts.
