= Ivo Fürer =

Roman Catholic prelate (1930–2022)

His Excellency, The Most Reverend Ivo Fürer
- Bishop Emeritus of St. Gallen
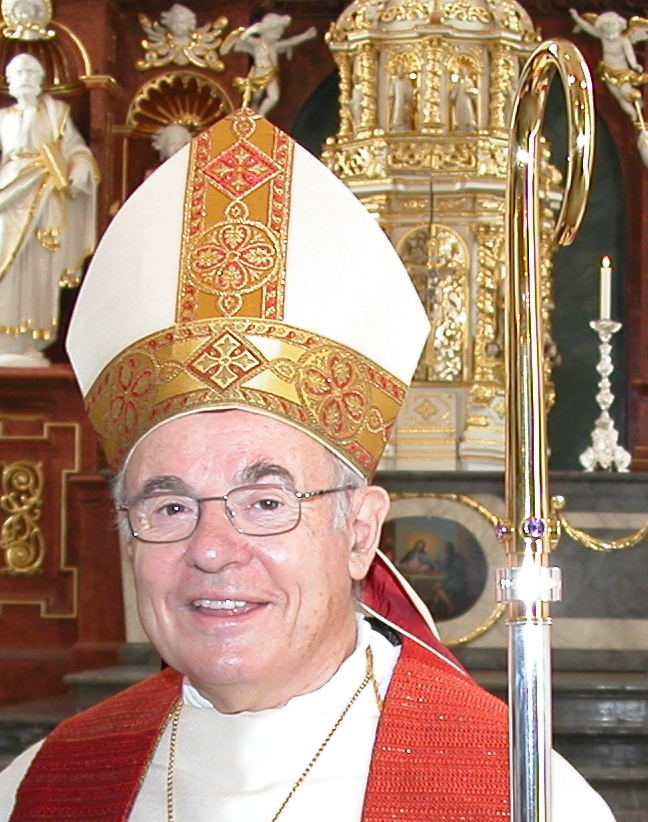
- Elected: 28 March 1995
- Term ended: 16 October 2005
- Predecessor: Otmar Mäder
- Successor: Markus Büchel
- Previous post: General Secretary of the Council of the Bishops' Conferences of Europe

Orders
- Ordination: 3 April 1954
- Consecration: 5 June 1995 by Otmar Mäder

Personal details
- Born: Ivo Fürer; 20 April 1930 Gossau, St. Gallen, Switzerland
- Died: 12 July 2022 (aged 92) Gossau, St. Gallen, Switzerland
- Denomination: Roman Catholic

Jakob Andreas Ivo Fürer (20 April 1930 – 12 July 2022) was a Swiss prelate of the Roman Catholic Church. He was Bishop of St. Gallen from 1995 to 2005.

== Biography ==
Fürer was born in Gossau, Switzerland, and studied Catholic theology at Innsbruck University and canon law in Rome at the Pontifical Gregorian University, where in 1957 he earned a doctorate in canon law. He was ordained a priest on 3 April 1954. He was a chaplain in Herisau from 1958 to 1963 and in Altstätten from 1963 to 1967. He became Bishop's Secretary in St. Gallen in 1967 and then Bishop's Vicar in 1969. In 1971 he helped found the Working Community of Christian Churches in Switzerland, a body of the National Council of Churches. In 1972 he was the president of the Swiss and diocesan synods. He was General Secretary of the Council of the Bishops' Conferences of Europe from 1977 to 1995. He became a cathedral deacon in 1991.

Fürer was elected bishop of St. Gallen on 28 March 1995 and appointed to that position the next day by Pope John Paul II. He was consecrated a bishop on 5 June 1995 by Bishop Otmar Mäder with Bishops Henri Salina and Karl Lehmann as co-consecrators.

In 1995 Fürer and Cardinal Carlo Maria Martini of Milan guided the formation of a group of about a dozen like-minded cardinals and bishops who met annually from 1995 to 2006 in St. Gallen to discuss Church reforms, including the appointment of bishops, collegiality, bishops' conferences, the primacy of the papacy, and sexual morality. They differed among themselves, but shared the view that Cardinal Joseph Ratzinger was not the sort of candidate they hoped to see elected at the next conclave. Though some media reports discussed this as a conspiracy, Fürer said in 2015 that it was a circle of friends (Freundeskreis) that at first discussed Church policy and then also candidates for the papacy as the health of Pope John Paul II declined. He said it last met in 2006.

As a member of the Swiss Bishops' Conference Fürer was responsible for the Deaconate and Relief Services. Beginning in 1997 he headed the Secretariat of the Council of European Bishops' Conferences. He submitted his resignation on his 75th birthday, and Pope Benedict XVI accepted it on 16 October 2005.

In 2005, the University of Fribourg awarded Fürer an honorary doctorate in recognition of his contribution to implementing the principles of the Second Vatican Council in Switzerland and in Europe. In 2007 the University of St. Gallen named him an Honorary Senator for "his important contribution towards the promotion of openness and tolerance across the borders of denominations and cultures".

From 1998 to 2009 Fürer served as Chairman of the Board of Trustees of the Swiss Catholic Lenten Fund (Fastenopfer), a Roman Catholic charity based in Lucerne that fights hunger and poverty and promotes the development of a sustainable way of life. Fürer died on 12 July 2022 at the age of 92, after a years-long fight with Parkinson's disease.

== Selected writings ==
- Die Eigentümer der st.-gallischen Bistumsfonds und der aus Kirchengut hervorgegangenen Fonds des kath. Konfessionsteils des Kantons St. Gallen, Menziken, Herisau 1960 (Dissertation)
- Die Bischofskonferenz: theologischer und juridischer Status, Patmos, Düsseldorf 1989, ISBN 3-491-77774-7, edited by Hubert Müller and Hermann J. Pottmeyer
- Co-author with Michael Fuss, Kurt Koch, Franz König, Guido Vergauwen: Neuevangelisierung Europas. Chancen und Versuchungen, St. Paul AG Universitätsverlag, Freiburg 1993, ISBN 3-7228-0318-7

Catholic Church titles
Preceded by Otmar Mäder	Bishop of St. Gallen; 1995–2005	Succeeded by Markus Büchel
