= Carlo Maria Martini =

Italian Jesuit and cardinal of the Catholic Church (1927–2012)

His Eminence Carlo Maria Martini S.J.
- Cardinal, Archbishop of Milan
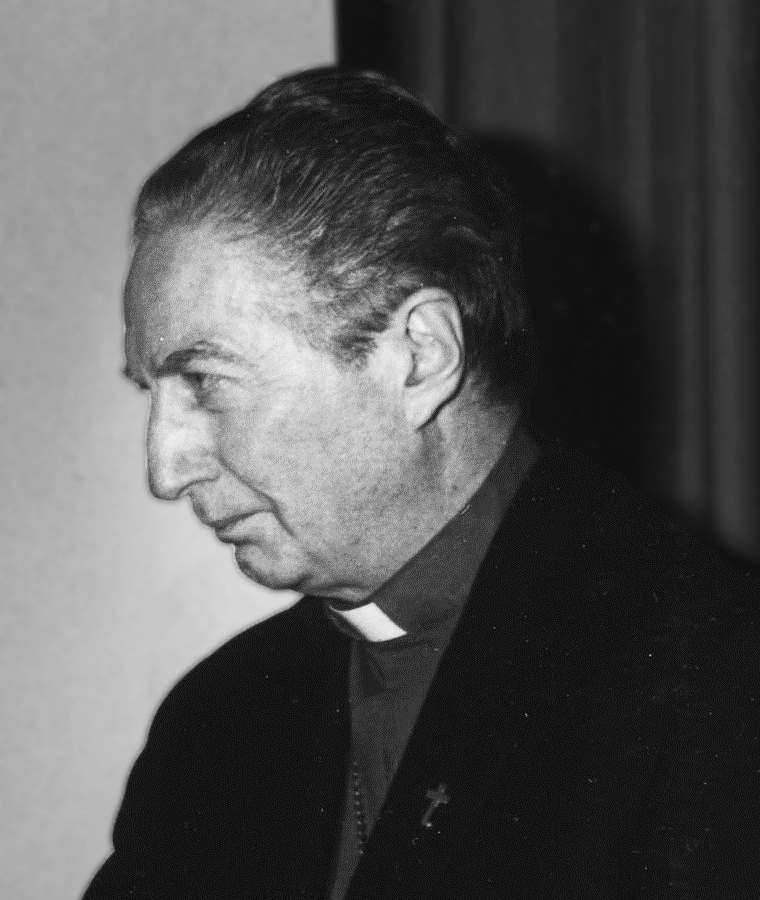
- Martini in 1992
- Church: Roman Catholic Church
- Archdiocese: Milan
- See: Milan
- Appointed: 29 December 1979
- Installed: 10 February 1980
- Term ended: 11 July 2002
- Predecessor: Giovanni Colombo
- Successor: Dionigi Tettamanzi
- Other post: Cardinal-Priest of Santa Cecilia in Trastevere (1983–2012)
- Previous posts: Rector of the Pontifical Biblical Institute (1969–78); Rector of the Pontifical Gregorian University (1978–79); President of the Council of European Bishops' Conferences (1986–93)

Orders
- Ordination: 13 July 1952 by Maurilio Fossati
- Consecration: 6 January 1980 by Pope John Paul II
- Created cardinal: 2 February 1983 by Pope John Paul II
- Rank: Cardinal-Priest

Personal details
- Born: Carlo Maria Martini; 15 February 1927 Orbassano, Kingdom of Italy
- Died: 31 August 2012 (aged 85) Gallarate, Italy
- Buried: Milan Cathedral, Italy
- Parents: Leonardo Martini; Olga Maggia
- Education: Pontifical Gregorian University; Pontifical Biblical Institute
- Motto: Pro veritate adversa diligere ("For the love of truth, dare to choose adverse situations")

- Coat of arms

Carlo Maria Martini SJ (15 February 1927 – 31 August 2012) was an Italian Jesuit and Biblical scholar. He served as Archbishop of Milan from 1980 to 2002 and was elevated to the cardinalate in 1983.

Martini entered the Society of Jesus in 1944 and was ordained a priest in 1952. A towering intellectual figure, Martini was the liberal contender for the papacy in the 2005 conclave, following the death of Pope John Paul II. According to highly placed Vatican sources, Martini received more votes in the first round than Cardinal Joseph Ratzinger, the conservative candidate. Ratzinger ended up with more votes in subsequent rounds and was elected pope.

Suffering from a rare form of Parkinson's disease, Martini retired as archbishop in 2002 and moved to the Pontifical Institute in Jerusalem. He died at the Jesuit Aloisianum College in Gallarate near Milan eight years later.

== Early life and education ==
Carlo Maria Martini was born on 15 February 1927 in Orbassano in the Province of Turin, Piedmont, to Leonardo, an engineer, and Olga (née Maggia) Martini. He was baptised on the following 22 February. He was educated at Istituto Sociale, a school run by Jesuits in Turin. He entered the Society of Jesus on 25 September 1944 and was ordained to the priesthood by Cardinal Maurilio Fossati on 13 July 1952. Martini completed his studies in philosophy at the Jesuits' House of Studies in Gallarate, in the province of Milan, and theology at the faculty of theology in Chieri.

In 1958, Martini was awarded his doctorate in fundamental theology from the Pontifical Gregorian University, with a thesis exploring the problems of the Resurrection accounts. After some years of teaching at the faculty of Chieri, he returned to Rome and earned another Doctorate in Sacred Scripture at the Pontifical Biblical Institute, graduating summa cum laude, with a thesis on a group of codices of the Gospel of Luke.

== Academic career ==
After completing his studies, Martini quickly pursued a successful academic career. In 1962, he was given the Chair of Textual Criticism at the Pontifical Biblical Institute. In 1969, he was appointed rector of the Pontifical Biblical Institute. Throughout these years, he edited a number of scholarly works. Martini became active in the scientific field by publishing various books and articles. Furthermore, he received the honour of being the only Catholic member of the ecumenical committee that prepared the new Greek edition of the New Testament, the Novum Testamentum Graece. In 1978, under Pope Paul VI, he was nominated to become the rector magnificus of the Pontifical Gregorian University, where he served until his appointment to the episcopacy.

Styles of Carlo Maria Martini
- Reference style: His Eminence
- Spoken style: Your Eminence
- Informal style: Cardinal

== Episcopate and cardinalate ==
On 29 December 1979, Pope John Paul II appointed Martini Archbishop of Milan. Martini received his episcopal consecration from John Paul the following 6 January, with Archbishop Eduardo Martínez Somalo and Bishop Ferdinando Maggioni serving as co-consecrators. In the consistory of 2 February 1983, he was assigned the title of Cardinal-Priest of Santa Cecilia in Trastevere. The motto he chose for his coat of arms is translated as "For the love of truth, dare to choose adverse situations".

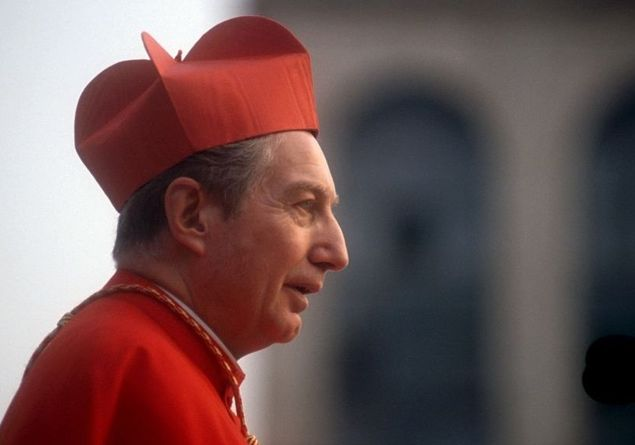
Martini in 2006

Martini served as relator of the sixth General Assembly of the Synod of Bishops in 1983 and as President of the European Bishops' Conference between 1987 and 1993.

In 1987, he began the so-called "cathedra of non-believers" (cattedra dei non-credenti) which was conceived together with the Italian philosopher Massimo Cacciari. It was a series of public dialogues held in Milan with agnostic or atheist scientists and intellectuals on the matters of bioethics, the social doctrine of the Church and the reasons to believe in God.

In 1996, Martini was presented with an honorary doctorate from the Russian Academy of Sciences. In Spain in October 2000, he was awarded the Prince of Asturias Award for Social Sciences. Martini was admitted as a member of the Pontifical Academy of Sciences in November 2000.

Martini was one of a group of like-minded prelates who met annually from 1995 to 2006 in St. Gallen, Switzerland, to discuss reforms concerning the appointment of bishops, collegiality, bishops' conferences, the primacy of the papacy, and sexual morality; they differed among themselves but shared the view that Cardinal Joseph Ratzinger was not the sort of candidate they hoped to see elected at the next conclave.

In 2002, Martini reached the Catholic Church's mandatory retirement age and was succeeded in Milan by Dionigi Tettamanzi. At the time of the 2005 conclave, he was 78 years old and hence eligible to vote for the new Pope (being under 80). For years, many "progressive" Catholics harboured hopes that he might eventually ascend to the papacy, but when John Paul II died, most commentators believed that his election was unlikely, given his liberal reputation and apparent frailty. Nevertheless, according to La Stampa (an Italian newspaper), he obtained more votes than Joseph Ratzinger during the first round of the election (40 vs. 38). Conversely, an anonymous cardinal's diary stated that he never mustered more than a dozen or so votes, in contrast to another Jesuit cardinal, Jorge Bergoglio of Buenos Aires, and quickly withdrew his candidacy. In his book La Chiesa brucia, Andrea Riccardi stated that Martini told him in a personal conversation that he had not been in favour of the election of Bergoglio. Upon reaching the age of 80 on 15 February 2007, Martini lost his right to vote in future conclaves.

In June 2012, when Pope Benedict XVI was contemplating retirement and was being urged not to retire by some of his closest confidants, Martini, suffering from Parkinson's, urged him to follow through on his decision to resign.

After his retirement, Martini moved to the Pontifical Biblical Institute in Jerusalem to continue his work as a biblical scholar. He returned to Milan in 2008, where he spent his final years in a Jesuit house.

== Death and funeral ==
Martini died in Gallarate on 31 August 2012. According to an online Zenit news statement about his death, Pope Benedict XVI, in his formal message of condolence sent by Cardinal Tarcisio Bertone, the Vatican Secretary of State, praised Martini's strength during his struggle with Parkinson's, his long service as Archbishop of Milan and his work as a scholar of the Bible. The Mayor of Milan, Giuliano Pisapia, led the tributes by saying, "Carlo Maria Martini illuminated the way for the entire city, not just for part of it. For this reason, today more than ever, Milan mourns its Archbishop."

More than 150,000 people passed before Martini's casket in the metropolitan cathedral of Milan before the Requiem Mass, following the Ambrosian rite, on 3 September. At the beginning of the ceremony, the representative of Pope Benedict, Angelo Cardinal Comastri, vicar general of the Vatican City, read a message. Cardinal Scola presided over the concelebrated Mass and delivered the homily. At the end of the Mass, Cardinal Tettamanzi read his remembrance. Concelebrating with Cardinal Scola were Cardinals Comastri, Tettamanzi, Bagnasco, Piovanelli, Romeo, and Ravasi. Also present were the sister of Martini, Maris, his niece Giulia, and his nephew Giovanni. In attendance were Father Adolfo Nicolás SJ, superior general of the Society of Jesus, and representatives of other Christian denominations and the Jewish and Muslim communities. The Italian government was represented by Prime Minister Mario Monti and his wife. In a private ceremony Martini was buried in a tomb on the left side of the cathedral facing the main altar.

== Views ==
Often considered to be one of the more liberal cardinals, Martini achieved widespread notice for his writings. On occasion, Martini's views proved to be controversial, thus bringing him comparatively large amounts of media coverage. Hours after his death, the Italian daily Corriere della Sera printed his final interview, in which he described the church as "200 years out of date", commenting:

"Our culture has aged, our churches are big and empty, and the church bureaucracy rises up. The Church must admit its mistakes and begin a radical change, starting from the Pope and the bishops. The pedophilia scandals oblige us to take a journey of transformation."

Martini was known to be "progressive" on matters concerning human relationships, the possible ordination of women to the diaconate, and some bioethical questions, notably contraceptive use in certain more complex situations.

=== Dominus Iesus ===
In 2000, Martini criticized Dominus Iesus, a declaration by the Congregation for the Doctrine of the Faith that the Catholic Church is the sole true Church of Christ, and described the document as "theologically rather dense, peppered with quotations, and not easy to grasp".

=== Contraception ===
In April 2006, in response to a very specific question from physician and politician Ignazio Marino, director of the transplant centre of the Thomas Jefferson University Hospital in Philadelphia, Martini opined: "The use of condoms can, in certain situations, be a lesser evil." He stressed the particular case of married couples where one has HIV or AIDS. He quickly noted that the principle of the lesser evil in such cases is one thing, and quite another the subject who has to convey those things publicly, thus it is not up to the Church authorities to support condom use publicly, because of "the risk of promoting an irresponsible attitude". The Church is more likely to support other morally sustainable means, such as abstinence. On another occasion, the cardinal stated that "I believe the Church's teaching has not been expressed so well. ... I am confident we will find some formula to state things better so that the problem is better understood and more adapted to reality."

In the book Nighttime Conversations in Jerusalem published in 2008, two Jesuits, Georg Sporschill and Carlo Maria Martini, answered critical questions of young people about the risk of faith in a discourse. In the book interview, Cardinal Martini stated that "many people have withdrawn from the Church, and the Church from people", due to the 1968 encyclical Humanae vitae which prohibited artificial contraception. According to the cardinal, Pope John Paul II followed the path of rigorous application and, for some period, considered issuing a pontifical declaration under the principle of papal infallibility, concluding that "probably the pope [Benedict XVI] will not revoke the encyclical, but he might write one that would be its continuation. I am firmly convinced that the Church can point out a better way than it did with Humanae vitae. Being able to admit one's mistakes and the limitations of one's previous viewpoints is a sign of greatness of soul and of confidence. The Church would regain credibility and competence."

=== Beginning of human life ===
Martini's position on the start of a distinct human life during the fertilization of oocytes was rebuked by certain Vatican officials.

=== Right to refuse treatments ===
Martini, speaking about the right to die debate, said that "terminally ill patients should be given the right to refuse treatments and that the doctors who assist them should be protected by law". It is traditional Catholic moral teaching that one is morally bound to apply "ordinary" treatments, but not "extraordinary" treatments. The distinction was the basis of the declaration by the Congregation for the Doctrine of the Faith in 1980 that "when inevitable death is imminent in spite of the means used, it is permitted in conscience to take the decision to refuse forms of treatment that would only secure a precarious and burdensome prolongation of life, so long as the normal care due to the sick person in similar cases is not interrupted". The Catechism of the Catholic Church also states: "Discontinuing medical procedures that are burdensome, dangerous, extraordinary, or disproportionate to the expected outcome can be legitimate". Martini, in fact, refused medical treatment as his illness advanced.

=== Collegiality of bishops ===
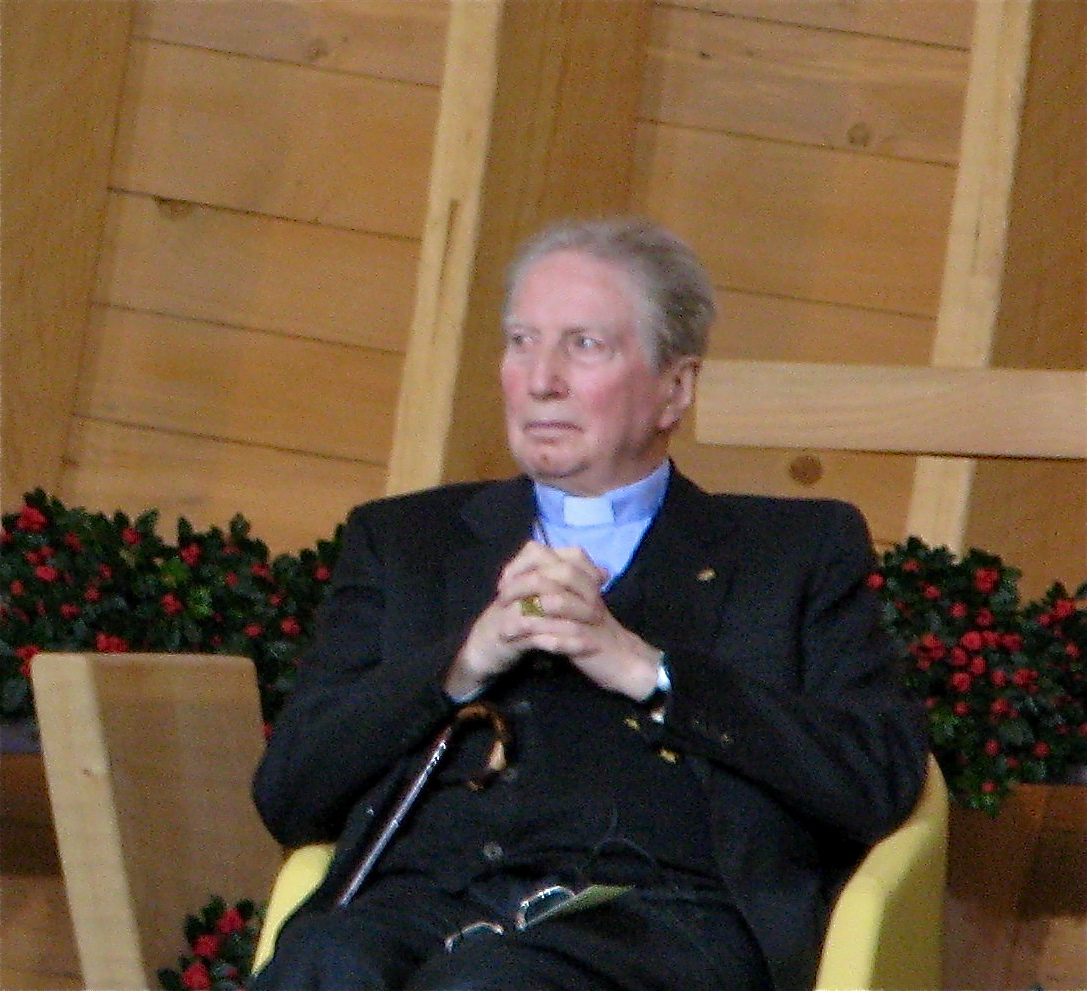
Martini in 2010

Martini called for greater collegiality in the governance of the Church and urged continued reflection on the structure and exercise of ecclesiastical authority.

=== Role of women in the Church ===
Martini demonstrated a desire for further theological enquiry on issues relating to human sexuality and the role of women in the Church and expressed support for the ordination of female deacons.

=== Sacramentum caritatis ===
In March 2007, some advocates of gay rights interpreted him as openly criticising the attitude of the Church authorities. While speaking at the Church of the Nativity in Bethlehem to a congregation of over 1,300 visitors, he remarked that "the Church does not give orders". Martini stated: "It is necessary to listen to others, and when speaking to use terms that they understand." These remarks came days after Pope Benedict XVI published the 140-page apostolic exhortation Sacramentum caritatis, a document giving the conclusions of the 2005 Ordinary General Assembly of the Synod of Bishops. Critics interpreted this document as an attempt to influence Catholic politicians, particularly when in 2007 the Italian government was unsuccessfully trying to pass legislation offering legal recognition of same-sex unions.

=== Social work ===
Furthermore, he promoted combating social ills, often calling for greater action to be taken to assist the socially underprivileged. Martini wished that the Church rekindle a "burning fire in the heart" of men and women today.

=== Catholic schools ===
Martini was a stringent supporter of Catholic schools, and many times he spoke in favour of state contributions to Catholic schools. He said that one hour a week of teaching the Catholic religion in the Italian high school was not enough, and the time dedicated to religious teaching in the school had to be increased.

=== Homosexuality ===
In his book Credere e conoscere, published shortly before his death, Martini stated: "I disagree with the positions of those in the Church that take issue with civil unions ... It is not bad, instead of casual sex between men, that two people have a certain stability" and that the "state could recognize them". Although he stated his belief that "the homosexual couple, as such, can never be totally equated to a marriage", he also said that he could understand (although not necessarily approve of) gay pride parades when they support the need for self-affirmation.

== Portrayal in popular culture ==
Martini's role in the 2005 papal conclave was portrayed by Achille Brugnini in the 2019 Netflix biographical film The Two Popes. His reputation as a leading contender for Pope only for support to not materialize at the papal conclave also inspired the character Aldo Bellini in Robert Harris' 2016 novel Conclave.

== Bibliography ==
- Belief or Nonbelief? (1996, with Umberto Eco)

Catholic Church titles
Preceded by Giovanni Colombo	Archbishop of Milan; 29 December 1979 – 11 July 2004	Succeeded by Dionigi Tettamanzi
Vacant Title last held by John Patrick Cody	Cardinal-Priest of Santa Cecilia in Trastevere; 2 February 1983 – 31 August 2012	Succeeded by Gualtiero Bassetti
