= Henri Schwery =

Swiss Catholic Cardinal (1932–2021)

His Eminence Henri Schwery
- Cardinal; Bishop of Sion
- Church: Roman Catholic
- Diocese: Sion
- Appointed: 22 July 1977
- Term ended: 1 April 1995
- Predecessor: François-Nestor Adam
- Successor: Norbert Brunner
- Other post: Cardinal Priest of Santi Protomartiri a Via Aurelia Antica (1991–2021)
- Previous post: President of the Swiss Bishops' Conference (1983–1988)

Orders
- Ordination: 7 July 1957 by François-Nestor Adam
- Consecration: 17 September 1977 by François-Nestor Adam
- Created cardinal: 28 June 1991 by Pope John Paul II
- Rank: Cardinal priest

Personal details
- Born: Henri Schwery; 14 June 1932 Saint-Léonard, Switzerland
- Died: 7 January 2021 (aged 88) Home Le Carillon, Saint-Léonard, Switzerland
- Motto: Spiritus Domini gaudium et spes ('The Spirit of the Lord, [our] joy and hope')

Styles of Henri Schwery
- Reference style: His Eminence
- Spoken style: Your Eminence
- Informal style: Cardinal
- See: Sion

Henri Schwery (14 June 1932 – 7 January 2021) was a Swiss prelate of the Catholic Church who was Bishop of Sion from 1977 to 1995. He was raised to the rank of cardinal in 1991.

== Early life and ordination ==
Born in St-Léonard, Valais, Schwery studied mathematics, theoretical physics, Catholic theology, and philosophy in Sion, Rome, and Fribourg. On 7 July 1957 he was ordained a priest.

== Professor and bishop ==
From 1961 to 1977, Schwery was part of the theological faculty of Sion, which he headed from 1972 to 1977.

Pope Paul VI appointed Schwery the Bishop of Sion on 22 July 1977. On 17 September 1977, he was consecrated a bishop by his predecessor as Bishop of Sion, François-Nestor Adam. He was president of the Swiss Bishops Conference from 1983 to 1988.

In his diocese in June 1988, Archbishop Marcel Lefebvre consecrated four bishops without papal approval. Schwery called for church unity when others clamored to call it a schism.

== Cardinal ==
On 28 June 1991, Pope John Paul II named Schwery a member of the College of Cardinals, assigning him as a cardinal-priest to Santi Protomartiri a Via Aurelia Antica. On 25 July 1991, Pope John Paul made him a member of the Congregation for Divine Worship and the Congregation for the Clergy.

During March of that year, he paid his respects when Lefebvre died, making a quiet visit to pray over his body alongside the Apostolic Nuncio to Switzerland Edoardo Rovida.

Pope John Paul accepted his resignation as Bishop of Sion on 1 April 1995 when he was 62. He had submitted his resignation citing health problems. Schwery was one of the cardinal electors who participated in the 2005 papal conclave that elected Pope Benedict XVI.

He died at a retirement home in St-Léonard on 7 January 2021.

Catholic Church titles
Preceded by François-Nestor Adam	Bishop of Sion; 1977–1995	Succeeded by Norbert Brunner
Preceded by Otmar Mäder	President of the Swiss Bishops' Conference; 1983–1988	Succeeded by Joseph Candolfi
