= Karl Johann Greith =

Swiss Catholic bishop and church historian

- Bishop of Sankt Gallen
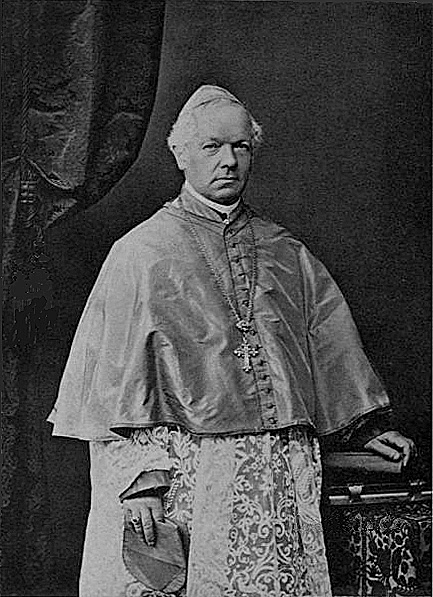
- Church: Catholic Church
- Diocese: Diocese of Sankt Gallen
- In office: 16 March 1863 – 17 May 1882
- Predecessor: Johann Peter Mirer
- Successor: Augustin Egger

Orders
- Ordination: 28 May 1831
- Consecration: 3 May 1863 by Josef Fessler

Personal details
- Born: 25 May 1807 Rapperswil, Canton of St. Gallen, Swiss Confederation
- Died: 17 May 1882 (aged 74) St. Gallen, Canton of St. Gallen, Switzerland

Karl Johann Greith (b. at Rapperswil, 25 May 1807; d. at St. Gallen, 17 May 1882) was a Swiss Catholic bishop and church historian.

== Life ==
He received his early education at St. Gall, then went to the lyceum at Lucerne and the Ludwig-Maximilians-Universität München; at the university he studied theology, philosophy, and history, and met Joseph Görres. In 1829 he went to Paris to perfect himself in library work; while there he decided to enter the priesthood and completed his theological studies in the Sulpician seminary of that city. He was ordained priest in 1831, and was made sub-librarian of St. Gall, also sub-regent and professor of the ecclesiastical seminary.

During the ecclesiastico-political troubles which soon after arose in Switzerland, Greith was prominent with pen and voice in defence of the Catholic Church. He was, consequently, deprived of his offices. He went to Rome, at the instance of the English Government, for the purpose of collecting documents in the Roman libraries and archives relating to English history. After the restoration of peace he devoted himself to parochial work in St. Gall, was made dean of the cathedral in 1847, professor of philosophy in 1853, and was consecrated Bishop of St. Gall in 1862.

From early years he had been an intimate friend of Ignaz von Döllinger, and at the First Vatican Council he held, in regard to the question of papal infallibility, that a dogmatic decision was inadvisable under existing circumstances. However, he accepted the decision of the council and tried to induce Döllinger to do the same.

Greith was a strong champion of ecclesiastical interests and defended the Catholic church against civil power. He could not prevent the suppression of his seminary for boys nor hinder the civil prohibition of missions and retreats; nevertheless he renewed the religious life of his diocese and called into being an educated clergy.

== Works ==
He devoted himself to the study of history and corresponded with numerous scholars, among others Joseph Freiherr von Lasaberg, Georg Heinrich Pertz, Johann Friedrich Böhmer, Franz Pfeiffer, Johann Friedrich Heinrich Schlosser, Franz Mone, Gall Morel, and others. His numerous ecclesiastico-political writings were only of transient importance, and they bear witness to his Catholic sentiments.

In his sermons and pastoral letters he laid great stress on the greatness and majesty of God as exhibited in the Redemption and in the founding and continuous activity of the Catholic Church. He published Katholische Apologetik in Kanzelreden in three volumes (Schaffhausen, 1847–52). He also wrote, in collaboration with the Benedictine Georg Ulber, Handbuch der Philosophie fur die Schule und das Leben (Freiburg, 1853–57).

Greith had no sympathy with scholastic philosophy and esteemed Descartes and Leibnitz.

His best and most lasting work was done in history. Among his historical publications were:

- Spicilegium Vaticanum, Beiträge zur näheren Kenntniss der vatikanischen Bibliothek für deutsche Poesie des Mittelalters (Frauenfeld, 1838)
- Die deutsche Mystik im Predigerorden (Freiburg, 1861)
- Der heilge Gallus (St. Gall, 1864)
- Die heiligen Glauensboten Columban und Gall (St. Gall, 1865)
- Geschichte der altirischen Kirche und ihrer Verbindung mit Rom, Gallien und Alemannien, 430-630 (Freiburg, 1867)

This last work is an exhaustive study of the foreign relations of the early Roman Catholic Church in Ireland, especially its relations with Rome and its missionary work.
