= St. Gallen Cathedral =

Roman Catholic cathedral in Switzerland

Coordinates: 47.4232°N 9.3767°E

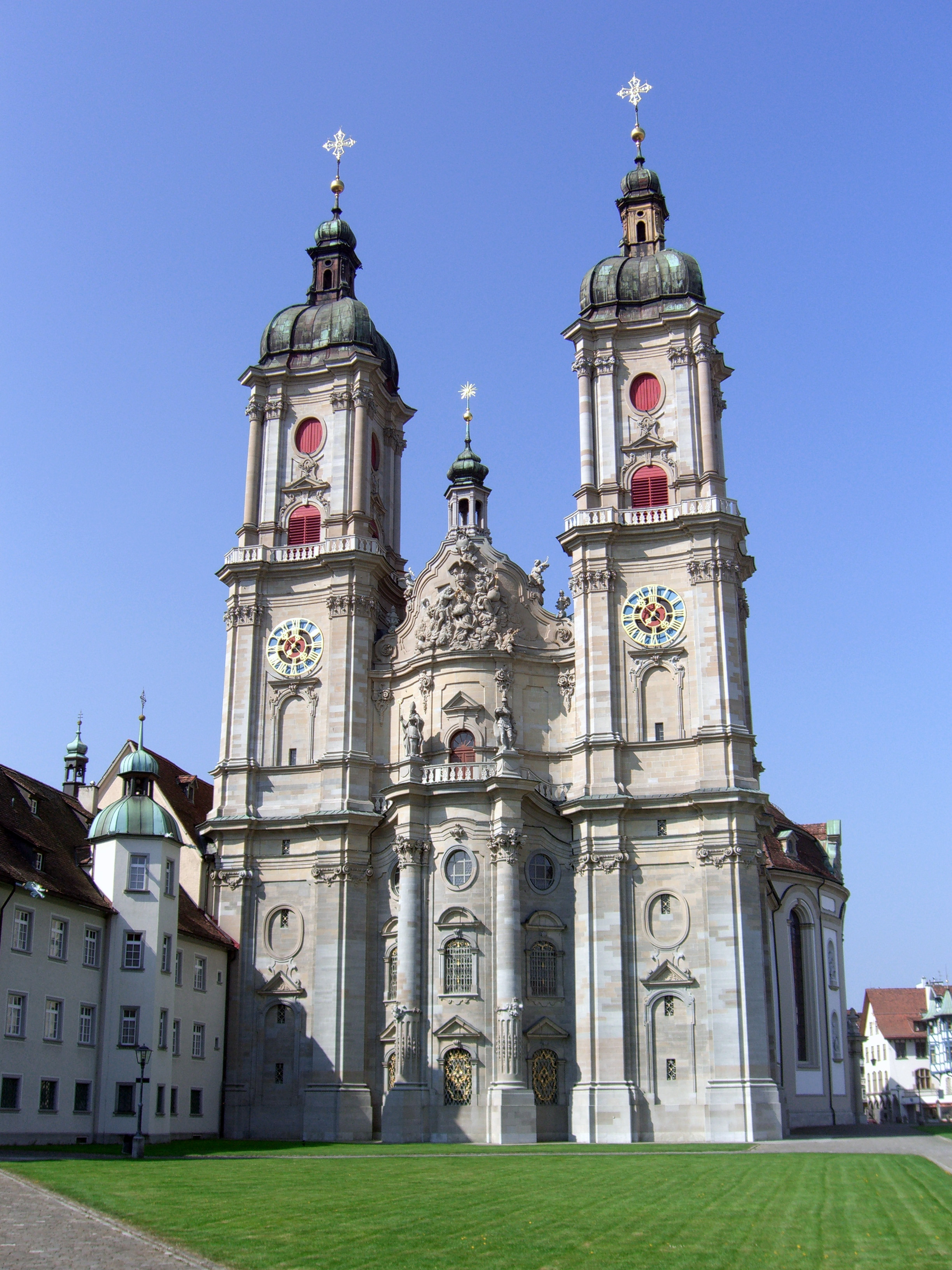
Exterior of the building in 2007

The Stiftskirche St. Gallus und Otmar (Collegiate Church of St. Gall and Otmar) is a Roman Catholic church in the city of St. Gallen, Switzerland. Once part of the Abbey of St. Gall, it has been the cathedral of the Diocese of St. Gallen since 1847. It is considered one of the last great sacred structures of the Baroque era, and is a UNESCO World Heritage site.

== History ==
The Cathedral stands on the spot where the itinerant Irish monk Gall built his hermitage in 612. Upon his death around 650, he was buried in the oratory within his cell. Today, his tomb is located beneath the high altar in the crypt, erected 837–39.

For several decades after his death, Gall's disciples remained together at the cell he had built and followed the rule of St. Columban, combining prayer with work of the hands and reading with teaching. In 719, St. Otmar, the brotherhood's first abbot, enlarged Gall's cell into the Abbey of St. Gall. His remains are housed at the west end of the cathedral in the St.Otmar crypt, where former bishops of St.Gallen are also laid to rest.

The first abbey church was built over Saint Gall's grave around 719, and underwent a number of subsequent modifications.

Construction of the present church was initiated in 1755 by Prince-abbot Cölestin Gugger von Staudach. Completed in 1767, the cathedral was designed by the Auer Zunft member Peter Thumb, who also designed the Abbey's famous library. Among its rich decorations are frescoes painted mostly by Josef Wannenmacher, and the most complete set of historic church bells in Switzerland. The south altar features a bell brought back by Saint Gall himself from Ireland, one of the three oldest surviving bells in Europe.

In 1805 the Canton of St.Gallen dissolved the abbey. After the dissolution of the monastery, the abbey church became a parish church, and with the establishment of the Diocese of St.Gallen in 1847, the cathedral.

The interior was renovated and restored to its original state between 1962–67.

== Bells ==
The collegiate church has nine bells in the two towers come from different founders, most of whom worked in the Lake Constance area. The south tower contains the 7 smaller bells while the north tower contains the two bourdon bells.The larger of the two bourdons is called the "Trinity Bell" and it shares the same note as the Great Bell of Bern Minster. Two more bells are housed in the two tower lanterns. From a music theory perspective, the overall chime does not correspond to any recognizable harmonic or melodic structure. 3 of the 9 bells also serve as clock bells; Gallus chimes every quarter hour while Mother of God and the bourdon Trinity in succession chime each the number of a full hour.

In Switzerland, the bells are always numbered from largest to smallest, Bell 1 is always the tenor or bourdon.

Bell Number	Bell Name	Casting year	Foundry, Casting location	Weight (kg)
1	Trinity (Bourdon Bell)	1768	Peter Ludwig I. Emperor	8100 kg
2	Sacred Heart (2nd Bourdon Bell)	1767	Peter Ludwig I. Emperor	5400 kg
3	Mother of God	1633	Jean Girard, La Mothe (Lorraine)	2750 kg
4	Michael / Hail Mary	1767	Peter Ludwig I. Emperor	1950 kg
5	Gallus / Convent Bell	1702	Andreas Aporta, Feldkirch	1700 kg
6	Guardian Angel	1766	Johann Heinrich Ernst, Lindau	1202 kg
7	Holy Cross	1772	Johann Leonhard IV. Rosenlächer, Constance	552 kg
8	St. John	1707	JB Ernst /Andreas Aporta, Feldkirch	492 kg
9	Poor souls	1616	Hieronymus Gesus, Constance	403 kg

== See also ==
- St. Gallus Chapel, a chapel within the abbey complex
