= Diocese of Saint Gallen =

Catholic diocese in Switzerland

Diocese of St. Gallen Dioecesis Sangallensis Bistum Sankt Gallen

Catholic
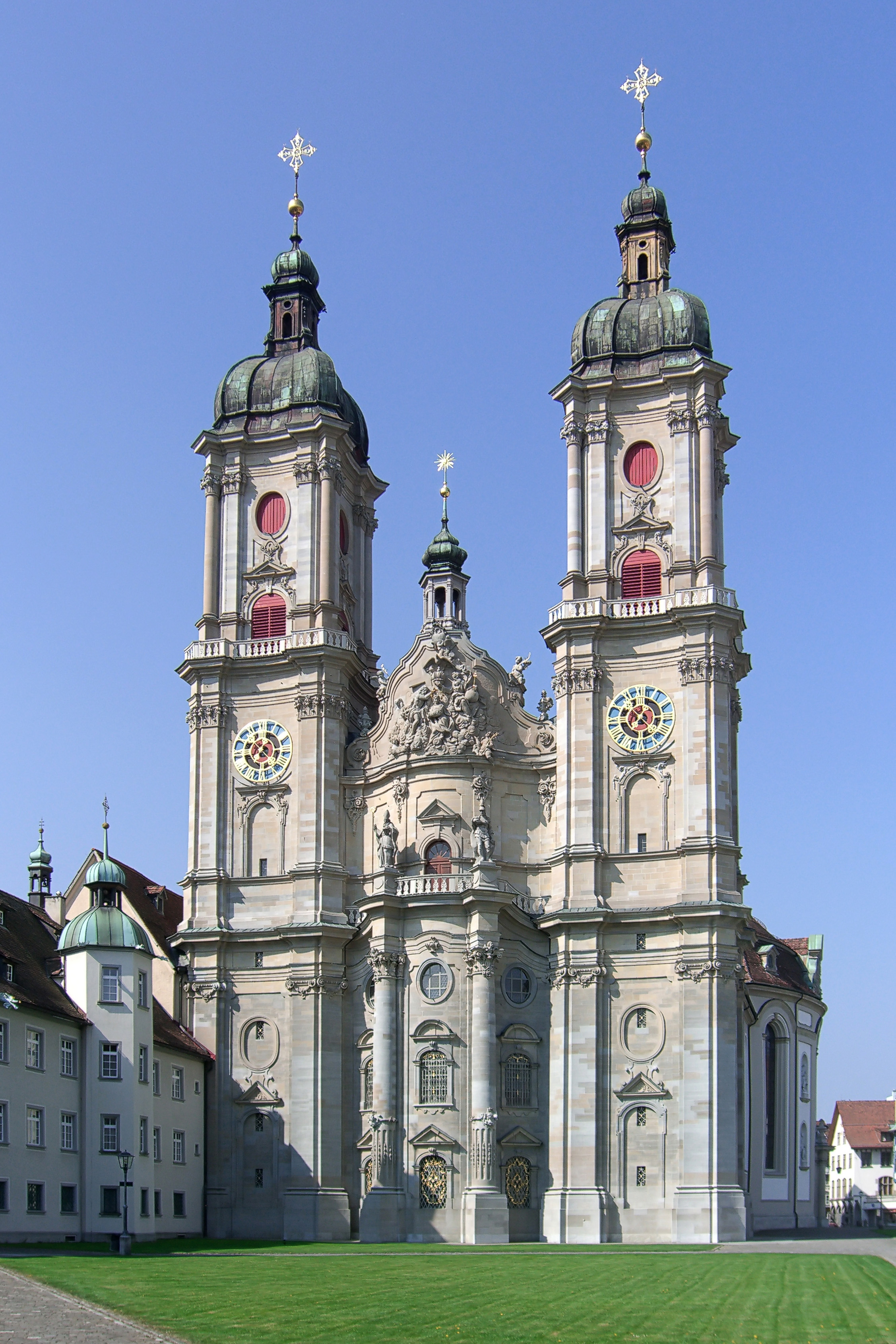
- St. Gallen Cathedral (officially the Collegiate Church of Saints Gall and Othmar).

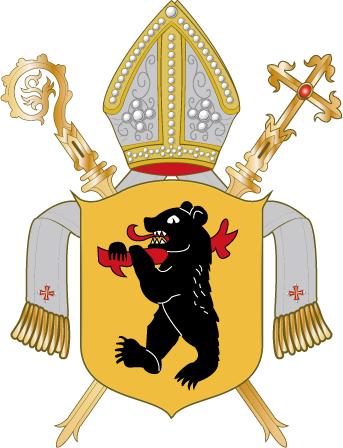
- Coat of arms

Location
- Country: Switzerland
- Metropolitan: Immediately subject to the Holy See

Statistics
- Area: 2,429 km^{2} (938 sq mi)
- Population: Total; Catholics: (as of 2022); 604,788; 238,094 (39.4%)
- Parishes: 142
- Churches: 149

Information
- Denomination: Catholic
- Sui iuris church: Latin Church
- Rite: Roman Rite
- Established: 8 April 1847
- Cathedral: St. Gallen Cathedral
- Patron saint: Saint Gall and Saint Othmar
- Secular priests: 78

Current leadership
- Pope: Leo XIV
- Bishop: Beat Grögli

Map
- Map of the Diocese

Website
- bistum-stgallen.ch

The Roman Catholic Diocese of Saint Gallen (Latin: Dioecesis Sangallensis, German: Bistum Sankt Gallen) is a Latin Catholic diocese in St. Gallen, Switzerland.

Although the region functioned as an important centre of Christianity in Europe during the Middle Ages, the diocese itself was only established in 1847. Its territory corresponds to the Canton of St. Gallen, with the bishop also acting on behalf of the cantons of Appenzell Ausserrhoden and Appenzell Innerrhoden as apostolic administrations.

The St. Gallen Cathedral, a UNESCO World Heritage Site, is the episcopal see of the diocese.

== History ==
=== Medieval History ===
Originally founded as a hermitage in the seventh century by the Irish missionary monk Gall (Latin: Gallus) the settlement that would later become known as St. Gallen was initially ruled by an Abbey of the same name. After the tenth century, the town around the Abbey gradually grew into an important cultural, monastic, and ecclesial centre during the Middle Ages.

Between the twelfth and fifteenth centuries, the Abbey of Saint Gall asserted varying levels of authority over the surrounding territory, contested by the neighbouring Prince-Bishop of Constance to the north and the Bishop of Chur to the south. Despite its elevation to the rank of Princely Abbey (German: Reichsfürst) within the Holy Roman Empire by King Philip of Germany in 1207, the Abbey remained a quasi-episcopal jurisdiction during the Middle Ages, making it a structurally distinct entity from the modern diocese.

=== Reformation ===
Following the Swiss Reformation, the city of St. Gallen officially adopted Protestantism in 1526 under the mayorship of Joachim Vadian. However, the Abbey remained Catholic, culminating in the construction of a partition wall (German: Schiedmauer) in 1566 to physically and symbolically separate the Protestant city from the Catholic abbey.

This religious duality persisted for centuries in the city of St. Gallen. In the surrounding countryside, a patchwork of confessional allegiances emerged. In Appenzell in particular, this led to relatively peaceful religious co-existence.

=== Modern History ===
The modern diocese emerged after the dissolution of the Abbey in 1805. Amid attempts to restructure ecclesiastical authority in eastern Switzerland, the regional parishes were initially united æque principaliter under the Diocese of Chur in 1823 before being established as full diocese in 1847. Johann Peter Mirer (1846–1862) served as its first bishop.

The Appenzell cantons have been administered as apostolic administrations since 1866.

Throughout its modern history, the diocese has been known to represent various positions regarded as liberal within the Catholic Church. Examples include Bishop Karl Johann Greith's (1862–1882) opposition to papal infallibility during the First Vatican Council. The diocese later embraced ecclesiastical renewal in the Church during the Second Vatican Council, notably under Bishop Joseph Hasler (1957–1976). More recently, it was also the centre of the reformist-oriented Saint Gallen Group, hosted by Bishop Ivo Fürer (1995–2005).

Due to financial concerns, clerical shortages and demographic shifts, the diocese underwent a major structural reorganization in 2015 under Bishop Markus Büchel (2006–2025), when it consolidated its parishes into 33 pastoral units (German: Seelsorgeeinheiten).

== Ordinaries ==
- Karl Rudolf Graf von Buol-Schauenstein (1824–1833), last Prince-Bishop of Chur
- Johann Georg Bossi (1835–1836)
- Vacant (1837–1845)
- Johann Peter Mirer (1846–1862)
- Karl Johann Greith (1862–1882)
- Augustin Egger (1882–1906)
- Ferdinand Rüegg (1906–1913)
- Robert Bürkler (1913–1930)
- Alois Scheiwiler (1930–1938)
- Joseph Meile (1938–1957)
- Joseph Hasler (1957–1976)
- Otmar Mäder (1976–1994)
- Ivo Fürer (1995–2005)
- Markus Büchel (2006–2025)
- Beat Grögli (2025–)

== Local saints ==
There are a number of local saints associated with the diocese, primary from the period between the eighth and tenth centuries. They include:

- Gall (c. 550–645)
- Othmar (c. 689–759)
- Herulph (c. 730–815)
- Magnus of Füssen (7th or 8th century)
- Notker the Stammerer (c. 840–912), venerated but never formally canonized.
- Tuotilo (died 915)
- Wiborada (died 926)
- Rachilidis (died 946)
- Ida of Toggenburg (c. 1140–1226)
