= Jean-Marie Lovey =

Swiss bishop

His Excellency Jean-Marie Lovey, C.R.B.
- Bishop of Sion
- Church: Catholic
- Diocese: Diocese of Sion
- Appointed: 8 July 2014
- Installed: 28 September 2014
- Predecessor: Norbert Brunner

Orders
- Ordination: 15 June 1977
- Consecration: 28 September 2014 by Norbert Brunner

Personal details
- Born: 2 August 1950 (age 76) Orsières, Switzerland
- Motto: Evangelii Gaudium
- Coat of arms

Styles of Jean-Marie Lovey, C.R.B.
- Reference style: The Most Reverend
- Spoken style: Your Excellency
- Religious style: Bishop
- Posthumous style: not applicable

Jean-Marie Lovey, C.R.B. (born 2 August 1950), is a Swiss prelate. Since 2014, he has been Bishop of Sion. Previously, he served as provost of the congregation of the Canons regular of the Great St Bernard from 2009 to 2014.

== Early life and education ==
Born on 2 August 1950 in Orsières, Jean-Marie Lovey grew up in Switzerland, in the village of Chez-les-Reuses in Valais. He was the eighth child in a family of eleven. Before entering religious life, he undertook and completed studies in philosophy and theology at the University of Fribourg.

== Ordained ministry ==
On 27 October 1971, he made his religious profession with the Canons Regular of the Congregation of the Great Saint Bernard. He was ordained a priest on 15 June 1971. He then became a chaplain in various schools in Valais. In December 2008, his predecessor Benoît-Barthélémy Vouilloz resigned from his position, having reached the statutory age of 70. On 4 February 2009, the chapter of canons elected Jean-Marie Lovey as his successor. On 14 June 2009, he received the abbatial blessing from Norbert Brunner in the church of Saint Michael in Martigny-Bourg. He holds this office until the summer of 2014. His successor is canon Jean-Michel Girard, who was elected on 29 October 2014 and took office on the same date.

=== Episcopal ministry ===
On 8 July 2014, at a press conference of the diocese of Sion, Norbert Brunner announced that Jean-Marie Lovey had been appointed by Pope Francis to succeed him in the see of Sion.

On 28 August 2014, St Augustine's Day, Jean-Marie Lovey celebrated his last mass as provost of the congregation of the Canons of the Great St Bernard in the church of Martigny. During the celebration, he confessed to having Augustine of Hippo as his episcopal model.

On Sunday 28 September 2014, Jean-Marie Lovey was ordained bishop in the Cathedral of Notre-Dame de Sion by Bishop Norbert Brunner as principal consecrator and by Charles Morerod and Luc Ravel as co-consecrators. The number of bishops and prelates present at the celebration was 127, and the total assembly was over 3,000 people.

His first decision as bishop was to reshuffle the vicarial team. He appointed Father Pierre-Yves Maillard as Vicar General for the French-speaking part of the diocese, succeeding Canon Bernard Broccard. He confirms Father Richard Lehner as Vicar General of the German-speaking part of the diocese. Canon Stefan Margelist is confirmed as Judicial Vicar and also appointed Episcopal Vicar. The administrative management of the diocese and the chancellery are entrusted to a deacon, Rev. Stéphane Vergère.
