= Joseph Candolfi =

- Titular Bishop of Frequentium
- Church: Roman Catholic Church
- See: Titular See of Frequentium
- In office: 1983 - Incumbent
- Predecessor: Enrico Assi
- Successor: Current
- Previous post(s): Prelate

Orders
- Ordination: 1 July 1947

Personal details
- Born: 15 July 1922; Reconvilier, Switzerland
- Died: 7 August 2011 (aged 89); Bellach, Switzerland

Joseph Candolfi (15 July 1922 – 7 August 2011) was a Swiss Prelate of the Catholic Church.

Joseph Candolfi was born in Reconvilier, Switzerland and ordained a priest on 1 July 1947. Candolfi was appointed bishop to the Diocese of Basel as well as Titular Bishop of Frequentium on 1 June 1983 and consecrated on 29 June 1983. Candolfi retired on 30 March 1996 as Auxiliary bishop.

== See also ==
- Diocese of Basel
