= Nicolaas van Buren =

Nicolaas van Buren (1578–1619), Latinized Nicolaus Burenus, was a Dutch Jesuit and a translator of controversial and devotional writings. Born in Arnhem, he became a Jesuit in 1596, and died in the Spanish Netherlands on 18 October 1619.

Authors that he translated include Martin Becanus, Francisco Arias, Robert Bellarmine, Luca Pinelli and Fulvio Androzzi.

== Translations ==
- Francisco Arias, Het goedt ghebruyck van de twee H. Sacramenten der Biechten ende des Autaers (Antwerp, Joachim Trognaesius, 1603; 2nd edition 1607)
- Robert Bellarmine, Opclimminghe des gheests tot Godt door de leeder der creatueren (Antwerp, Willem Lesteens, 1617)
- Fulvio Androzzi, Onderwys oft practycke om dikwils het H. Sacrament des Autaers profytelyck te nutten (Antwerp, Willem Lesteens, 1618)
- Martin Becanus, Verschillen oft verscheijden titels der Calvinisten (Antwerp, Willem Lesteens, 1618)
- Francisco Arias, Van de tegenwoordigheid Gods (Antwerp, Willem Lesteens, 1619)
- Luca Pinelli, De cracht ende Misterie der H. Misse (Antwerp, Willem Lesteens, 1620)
