= Willem Lesteens =

17th-century printer and publisher in Antwerp

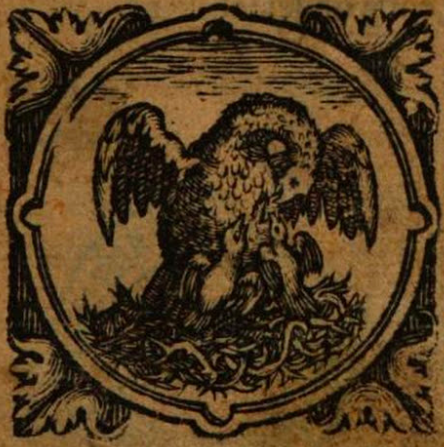
Printer's mark of Willem Lesteens from the title page of Metamorphosis (1619)

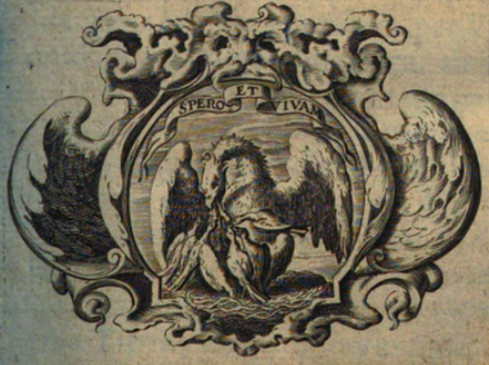
Printer's mark of Willem Lesteens from the title page of Aubert Miraeus, Rerum Belgicarum Chronicon (1636)

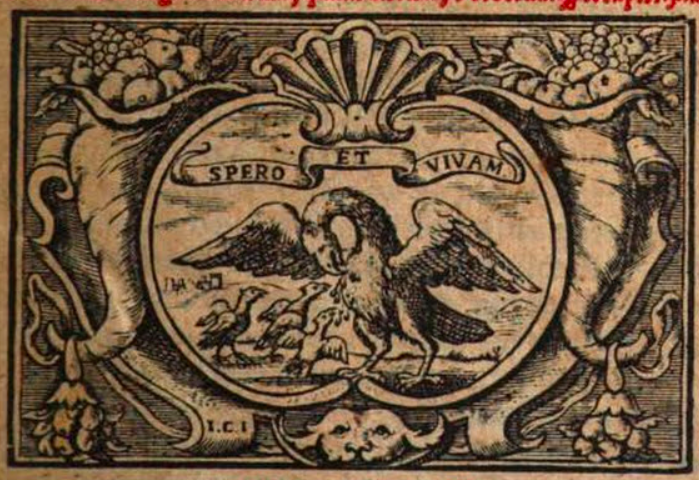
Printer's mark of Willem Lesteens from the title page of Massaeus Potvliet, Soete bemerckinghen (1656)

Guiliam or Willem Lesteens (1590–1661), Latinized Gulielmus Lesteenius, was a printer and publisher in the city of Antwerp, in the Spanish Netherlands.

== Life ==
Lesteens was born in Antwerp on 19 April 1590, the son of Gaspard Lesteens and Catherine Jauwens. In 1612 he married Maria Verdussen, the eldest daughter of his godfather, Hieronymus Verdussen, and set up in business as an independent printer. His shop in the Hoogstraat bore the sign of the Gulden Pelicaen (Golden pelican). His printer's mark was a pelican with spread wings feeding its young; in later versions flanked by horns of plenty.

He shared the privilege of printing decrees on coinage with his brother-in-law, Hieronymus Verdussen the Younger, from 26 June 1625 until Verdussen's death in 1653.

In 1641 he served a term as dean of De Olijftak, a chamber of rhetoric, and in 1642–1644 two terms as dean of the Guild of St Luke. In the 1640s he was also the leading figure in an association of Antwerp printers (sociorum typographum Antverpiensium) that clubbed together to share the costs (and risks) of producing expensive editions.

In 1650 Lesteens' daughter, Claire, married Engelbert Gymnicus. After Lesteens' death in 1661, Gymnicus took over the running of the family business in 1662.

== Publications ==
1617

- Robert Bellarmine, Opclimminghe des gheests tot Godt door de leeder der creatueren, translated by Nicolaus Burenus (on Google Books)

1618

- Fulvio Androzzi, Onderwys oft practycke om dikwils het H. Sacrament des Autaers profytelyck te nutten, translated by Nicolaus Burenus
- Martinus Becanus, Verschillen oft verscheijden titels der Calvinisten, translated by Nicolaus Burenus (on Google Books)

1619

- Ovid, Metamorphosis dat is: die Herscheppinghe oft Veranderinghe, translated by Joannes Florianus – an illustrated Dutch Metamorphoses (on Google Books)
- Francisco Arias, Van de tegenwoordigheid Gods, translated by Nicolaus Burenus

1620

- Luca Pinelli, De cracht ende Misterie der H. Misse, translated by Nicolaus Burenus
- Robert Bellarmine, De conste om wel te sterven, translated by Jacobus Stratius (on Google Books)

1622

- Benet Canfield, Den reghel der volmaeckheyt (on Google Books; 2nd edition 1623 on Google Books; 3rd edition 1631 on Google Books)
- Jan Van Coudenberghe, Onse L. Vrovwe der seven vveeen. Met de mirakelen, getyden, ende misse der selver: insgelycks den oorspronck, ende voortganck der broederschap, translated by Jacobus Stratius (on Google Books)
- Richard Verstegan, Scherp-sinnighe characteren. Oft subtijle beschrijvinghe (on Google Books)

1626

- Heyman Jacobs, Den cleynen herbarius, ofte Cruydt-boecxken (on Google Books)

1628

- Joannes Busaeus, Den schadt der meditatien op allen de Evangelien vande Sondaghen ende Heylighe-daghen vanden gheheelen Jaere, translated by Cornelius Thielmans (on Google Books)
- Simon Verepaeus, Een hantboecxken van seer schoone catholijcke ghebeden (on Google Books)

1631

- Pierre Marchant, Expositio litteralis in Regulam S. Francisci – an exposition of the Rule of St Francis

1635

- Gratulatio in inaugurationem ... Gasparis Nemii, episcopi Antverpiensis – a celebration of the consecration of Gaspard Nemius as bishop of Antwerp (on Google Books)

1636

- Aubert Miraeus, Rerum Belgicarum Chronicon ab Julii Caesaris in Galliam adventu usqve ad vulgarem Christi Annum M.DC.XXXVI (on Google Books)

1639

- Luis de la Puente, Het leven van P. Balthazar Alvarez religieus der Societeyt Iesu, translated by Ludovicus Jacobus (on Google Books)

1644

- François-Hyacinthe Choquet, De heylighen ende salighe in Nederlandt van het Oorden der Predick-heeren, translated by Léonard Janssen-Boy – a hagiography of Dominican saints from the Low Countries (on Google Books)

1651

- Joannes van Heumen, Den sterfelycken Adam, leerende de maniere van saligh te sterven (on Google Books)
- Simon De Coninck, Ontdeckten leughen-geest van alle af-ghedwaelde leeraers (on Google Books)

1653

- Livinus Vaentkens, Sancti Bernardi doctoris melliflui vitae medulla quinquaginta quatuor iconibus representata (on Google Books)

1654

- with Engelbert Gymnicus: Alan of Lille, Alani magni de Insulis, Doctoris Universalis, Opera Moralia, Paraenetica et Polemica, edited by Charles de Visch (on Internet Archive)

1656

- with Engelbert Gymnicus: Massaeus Potvliet, Soete bemerckinghen op het Synode der Ghereformeerde ghehouden binnen Dordrecht inde Iaren 1618 ende 1619 (on Google Books)
