= Bartholomew of Pisa =

Bartholomew of Pisa may refer to:

- Bartholomew Albizzi (died 1342), Franciscan hagiographer
- Bartholomew Rinonico (died c. 1401), Italian Franciscan and chronicler
- Bartholomew of San Concordio, (died 1347) Dominican canon lawyer
