= Bartholomew Rinonico =

Italian Franciscan and chronicler

Bartholomew of Pisa (Bartholomew Rinonico) was an Italian Franciscan and chronicler.

He was a Pisan of noble family. In 1352 he was a student at Bologna and later filled the office of Lector there as well as at Padua, Pisa, Sienna, and Florence. He also preached for many years with great succession different Italian cities. He died about 1401, renowned no less for sanctity than for learning, and is commemorated in the Franciscan Martyrology on 4 November.

Bartholomew's chief title to fame rests upon his book, "De Conformitate Vitae B. P. Francisco ad Vitam Domini Nostri Jesu Christi", begun in 1385 and formally approved by the general chapter held at Assisi in 1399. Enthusiastically received on its appearance and long held in high esteem, this work became the object of bitter attacks on the part of Lutherans and Jansenists. Against it Erasmus Alber wrote the "Alcoranus Franciscanus" (Der Barfusser Monche Eulenspiegel und Alcoran mit einer Vorrede D. M. Luthers, 1531) in reply to which Henricus Sedulius published his "Apologeticus adversus Alcoranum Franciscanorum pro libro Conformitatum" (Antwerp, 1607).

Subsequent writers on Franciscan history ignored the work; more recently it has been over-praised. Between these extreme views, the "Conformities" is a book of very uneven value. The parallels between the lives of Jesus and Francis of Assisi which form its basis are sometimes forced, but nowhere does it make Francis the equal of Christ. Side by side with fantastic legends, ridiculous visions, and other absurdities, it contains historical information. It is considered a source of great importance for Franciscan history. It was first printed at Milan in 1510 and in 1513. The new edition published at Bologna in 1590 is mutilated and corrupted, especially in the historical parts, at almost every page. A critical edition of the text was published in tom. IV of the "Analecta Franciscana" (Quaracchi, 1906).

In addition to the "Conformities", Bartholomew left some thirty other works, including an exposition of the Rule of the Friars Minor found in the "Speculum" Morin (Rouen, 1509) and a book "De Vita B. Mariae Virginis", published at Venice in 1596; his Lenten sermons were printed at Milan in 1498, Venice, 1503, and Lyons, 1519. Sbaralea and others have attributed to him the "Summa Casuum Conscientiae", which is really the work of Bartholomew a S. Concordio of Pisa, and the "Vita B. Gerardi", which was written by Bartholomew Albisi.
