= Paolo Dezza =

Italian Catholic cardinal (1901–1999)

His Eminence Paolo Dezza S.J.
- Cardinal-Deacon of Sant'Ignazio di Loyola a Campo Marzio
- Church: Roman Catholic Church
- Appointed: 28 June 1991
- Term ended: 17 December 1999
- Successor: Roberto Tucci
- Previous posts: Rector Magnificus of the Pontifical Gregorian University (1941-51); Pontifical Delegate for the Society of Jesus (1981-83)

Orders
- Ordination: 25 March 1928
- Created cardinal: 28 June 1991 by Pope John Paul II
- Rank: Cardinal-Deacon

Personal details
- Born: Paolo Dezza; 13 December 1901 Parma, Kingdom of Italy
- Died: 17 December 1999 (aged 98) Rome, Italy
- Buried: Campo Verano (1999-2006); Sant'Ignazio di Loyola a Campo Marzio

Paolo Dezza, S.J. (13 December 1901 in Parma, Italy – 17 December 1999 in Rome) was an Italian Jesuit cardinal who led the Pontifical Gregorian University during the pontificate of Pope Pius XII, whom he aided in the preparation of the dogma of the Assumption of Mary. He was confessor to Pope Paul VI and Paul's successor, Pope John Paul I, and was a teacher of Pope John Paul I's successor, Pope John Paul II.

In 1981, after Superior General Pedro Arrupe suffered a debilitating stroke, Pope John Paul II appointed Dezza to head the Jesuit order. In 1991, Dezza was named a cardinal.

== Biography ==
Aged seventeen, Dezza entered the Jesuit order on 2 December 1918. He studied both in Madrid, Spain Naples, Italy and Innsbruck, Austria. On 25 March 1928, he was ordained priest. A brilliant scholar, he was named professor of philosophy at the Gregorian University, but had to spend several years in Switzerland because of health complications. In 1935, he was named Provincial for the region Venice and Milan, and in 1941, he was named head of the Gregorian University With Robert Leiber, Augustin Bea, Otto Faller, G. Hentrich and R. G. de Moos he assisted in the preparation of the dogma of the Assumption of Mary.

In 1945, he baptized Israel Zolli, the Chief Rabbi of Rome and head of the Jewish community, who, in recognition of the interventions of Pope Pius XII for the Jews in Rome during German occupation, took on the name Eugenio Zolli. Eugenio Zolli worked for the rest of his life in the Gregorian University. Dezza was said to be a leading candidate in the election for a new Jesuit General in 1946. From 1951 on he headed as General Secretary the International Federation of Catholic Universities (FIUC). He was confessor to two popes, Paul VI and John Paul I. He arrived at the Vatican every Friday evening at seven P.M. The only words he ever spoke about his long service to Pope Paul VI during his pontificate were, "This pope is a man of great joy."

After the death of Pope Paul VI, Dezza was more outspoken, saying, "If Paul VI was not a saint, when he was elected Pope, he became one during his pontificate. I was able to witness not only with what energy and dedication he toiled for Christ and the Church but also and above all, how much he suffered for Christ and the Church. I always admired not only his deep inner resignation but also his constant abandonment to divine providence."

In 1981, the Jesuit Superior General, Pedro Arrupe, suffered a stroke. Prominent progressivist Jesuits who supported the direction of liberation theology reportedly hoped that their Vicar General, an American, the Rev. Vincent O'Keefe, would be appointed interim Superior General until the next General Congregation of the Order. Pope John Paul II, recovering from his assassination attempt, unexpectedly intervened and appointed Dezza instead as a special pontifical delegate to serve as the Jesuits' interim leader. The pope knew Dezza personally as his teacher. As a student in the Belgian College in Rome after the war, he had attended Dezza's lectures at the Pontifical Gregorian University. In 1983, at its 33rd General Congregation, the Jesuits elected Peter Hans Kolvenbach, a Dutch academic, as their new Superior General on the first ballot.

The Pope elevated Dezza, aged 89, to cardinal in 1991 as Cardinal-Deacon of S. Ignazio di Loyola a Campo Marzio. In 1999, the Pope celebrated the funeral mass at which he said:

My venerable Predecessor Paul VI, during very difficult years for the Church and for the Society of Jesus, found in Fr. Dezza the servant of Christ, the authentic Jesuit, the spiritual man on whose wise advice he could rely in the difficulties of his lofty mission. I myself created him a special Papal Delegate for the Society of Jesus in an important phase of its history. To serve Christ in the person of his Vicar: St Ignatius' precept was the ideal which inspired the late Cardinal's whole life in his faithful, caring, intelligent and prudent, generous and impartial outlook. He knew of the faults that existed in the Church and in her men, but with caring dedication, full of love and faith, he helped to alleviate their effects, working for the authentic renewal of the Church.

— Pope John Paul II

Dezza is buried in the Church of Sant'Ignazio in Rome, near the grave of St. Robert Bellarmine.

== Selected publications ==
- Adnotationes in tractatum de ontologia. - Rome, 1930
- La filosophia del christianesimo. -Milan, 1949
- Metaphysica generalis. - Rome, 1964

== Sources ==
- "Homily of Pope John Paul II on Paolo Cardinal Dezza S J" on 20 December 1999 on the Vatican website
- Catholic Hierarchy
- Stanley, Alessandra (22 December 1999). "Cardinal Paolo Dezza, 98; Guided the Jesuits". The New York Times.
