= Luca Pinelli =

Luca Pinelli may refer to

- Luca Pinelli (ice hockey) (born 2005), Canadian ice hockey player
- Luca Pinelli (theologian) (1542–1607), Italian Jesuit and theologian
