= Cornelius Thielmans =

Franciscan hagiographer

Cornelius Thielmans (c. 1570–1634) was a Franciscan hagiographer from the Habsburg Netherlands.

== Life ==
Thielmans was born in Brussels around 1570. He joined the Cologne province of the Franciscan order, and served as guardian of houses in 's-Hertogenbosch and Aachen, as definitor in Cologne, and as spiritual director to the Annunciate convent in Antwerp. He died in Tongeren in 1634.

== Works ==
Thielmans was one of the leading scholars in Brussels who published works that focused on the Franciscan literature. One of his works that has been documented was a 1622 print that depict a tree trunk genealogical design that emanates from the body of St. Francis and featured branches that included Anthony of Padua, Bonaventure, and Louis of Toulouse.

Aside from his own works, Thielmans also collaborated with other scholars. For instance, he translated the Latin works of Henricus Sedulius.

Some of his notable works include the following:

- Cort verhael der Heylighen van S. Franciscus Oirden, met haer levende figuren ('s-Hertogenbosch, Jan Scheffer, 1606) – dedicated to Anthonie Schetz de Grobbendoncq
- D'Leven vande H. Maghet Clara (Antwerp, Pauwels Stroobant, 1616)
- translation: Bonaventure, Verscheyde opuscula (1627)
- translation: Joannes Busaeus, Den schadt der meditatien op allen de Evangelien vande Sondaghen ende Heylighe-daghen vanden gheheelen Jaere (Antwerp, Willem Lesteens, 1628)
- Seraphische historie van het leven des alderheylichste vader S. Francisci van Assysien (Leuven, Cornelis Coenesteyn and Joan Oliviers, 1628)
