= Erasmus Alberus =

German humanist, reformer and poet (c. 1500–1553)

- Born: 1500; Bruchenbrücken
- Died: 5 May 1553 (aged 52–53)
- Education: University of Wittenberg
- Occupations: Humanist, Lutheran reformer, poet

Erasmus Alberus (c. 1500 – 5 May 1553) was a German humanist, Lutheran reformer, and poet.

== Life ==
He was born in the village of Bruchenbrücken (now part of Friedberg, Hesse) about the year 1500. Although his father Tilemann Alber was a schoolmaster, his early education was neglected. In 1518, he enrolled at the University of Wittenberg, where he studied theology. He had the good fortune to attract the attention of Martin Luther and Philipp Melanchthon, and subsequently became one of Luther's most active helpers in the Protestant Reformation.

Not only did he fight for the Protestant cause as a preacher and theologian, but he was almost the only member of Luther's party who was able to confront the Roman Catholics with the weapon of literary satire. In 1542 he published a prose satire to which Luther wrote the preface, Der Barfüsser Mönche Eulenspiegel und Alkoran, a parodic adaptation of the Liber conformitatum of the Franciscan Bartolommeo Rinonico of Pisa, in which the Franciscan order is held up to ridicule. This drew reactions from Catholic scholars such as Henricus Sedulius, who published the Apologeticus aduersus Alcoranum Franciscanorum, pro Libro Conformitatum, which criticized Alberus' arguments in this satire.

Of higher literary value is the didactic and satirical Buch von der Tugend und Weisheit (1550), a collection of forty-nine fables in which Alberus embodies his views on the relations of Church and State. His satire is incisive, but in a scholarly and humanistic way; it does not appeal to popular passions with the fierce directness which enabled the master of Catholic satire, Thomas Murner, to inflict such telling blows.

Several of Alberus's hymns, all of which show the influence of his master Luther, have been retained in the German Protestant hymnal.

After Luther's death, Alberus was for a time a deacon in Wittenberg; he became involved, however, in the political conflicts of the time, and was in Magdeburg in 1550–1551, while that town was besieged by Maurice, Elector of Saxony. In 1552 he was appointed General Superintendent at Neubrandenburg in Mecklenburg, where he died on 5 May 1553.

== Translations ==
- Alberus' Thanksgiving Hymn: To You, O God, Our Thanks We Give, translated by Nathaniel J. Biebert (Red Brick Parsonage, 2014).
