= Sant'Ignazio, Rome =

Sant'Ignazio Church
- Church of St. Ignatius of Loyola at the Campus Martius
- Italian: Chiesa di Sant'Ignazio di Loyola in Campo Marzio; Latin: Ecclesia Sancti Ignatii a Loyola in Campo Martio
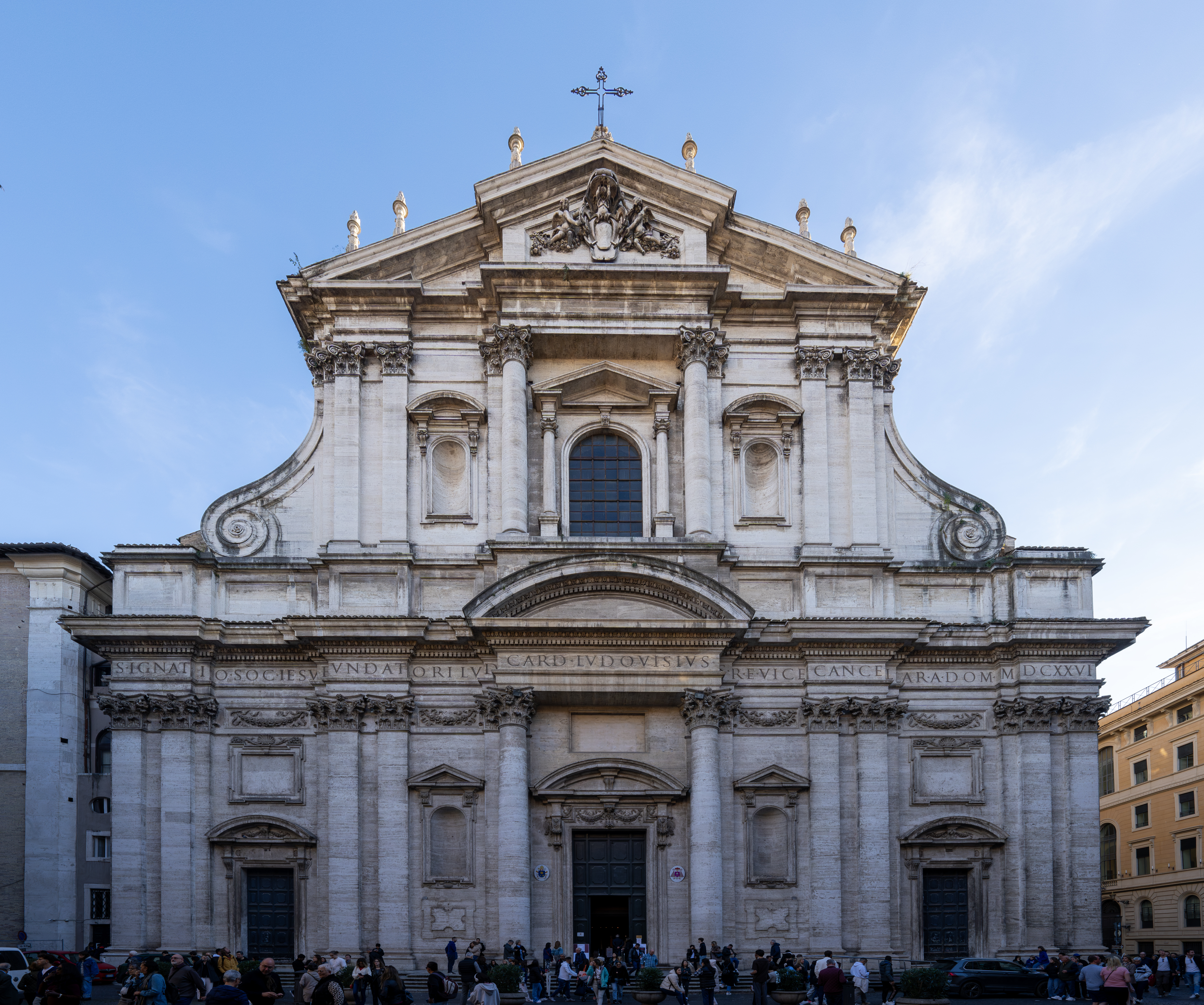
- Façade of Sant'Ignazio
- Click on the map for a fullscreen view
- 41°53′56.4″N 12°28′47.2″E
- Location: Via del Caravita, 8A; Rome
- Country: Italy
- Denomination: Catholic
- Religious institute: Jesuits
- Website: santignazio.gesuiti.it

History
- Status: Parish church titular church regional church
- Consecrated: 1722: Saint Robert Bellarmine; Saint John Berchmans

Architecture
- Functional status: Active
- Architect(s): Orazio Grassi, S.J.
- Style: Baroque
- Groundbreaking: 1626-08-02
- Completed: 1650

Specifications
- Length: 90 metres (300 ft)
- Width: 50 metres (160 ft)

Administration
- Diocese: Rome

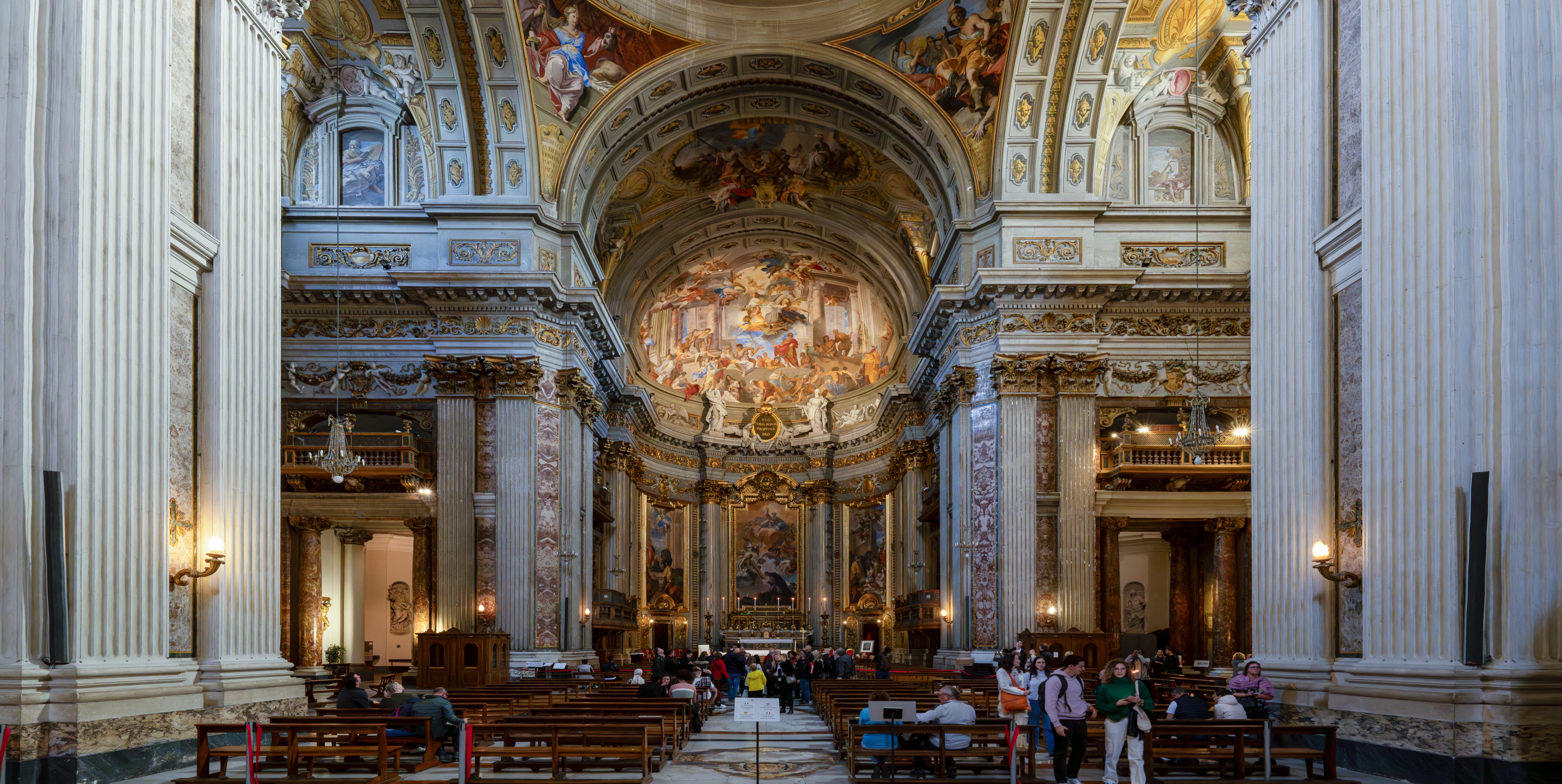
Nave

The Church of St. Ignatius of Loyola at Campus Martius (Italian: Chiesa di Sant'Ignazio di Loyola in Campo Marzio, Latin: Ecclesia Sancti Ignatii a Loyola in Campo Martio) is a Latin Catholic titular church, of deaconry rank, dedicated to Ignatius of Loyola, the founder of the Society of Jesus, located in Rome, Italy. Built in Baroque style between 1626 and 1650, the church functioned originally as the chapel of the adjacent Roman College, which moved in 1584 to a new larger building and was renamed the Pontifical Gregorian University. It is one of the great 17th century preaching churches built by Counter-Reformation orders in the Centro Storico (the others being The Gesù, also of the Jesuits, San Carlo ai Catinari of the Barnabites, Sant'Andrea della Valle of the Theatines, and the Chiesa Nuova of the Oratorians).

== History ==
The Collegio Romano opened very humbly in 1551, with an inscription over the door summing up its simple purpose: "School of Grammar, Humanity, and Christian Doctrine. Free". Plagued by financial problems in the early years, the Collegio Romano had various provisional centres. In 1560, Vittoria della Tolfa, Marchesa della Valle, donated her family isola, an entire city block and its existing buildings, to the Society of Jesus in memory of her late husband the Marchese della Guardia Camillo Orsini, founding the Collegio Romano. She had previously intended to donate it to the Poor Clares for the founding of a monastery. The nuns had already started to build what had been intended to become the Church of Santa Maria della Nunziata, erected on the spot where the Temple of Isis had stood.

Although the Jesuits got the marchesa's land, they did not get any money from her for completing the church. Budgetary constraints compelled them to hire their own architect. Construction of the church was taken over by the Jesuit architect Giovanni Tristano. Built entirely by Jesuit labour, the Church of the Annunciation was first used for worship in 1567. A three-aisled church dedicated to the Most Holy Annunciation (Italian: Santissima Annunziata) was built by the Collegio Romano between 1562 and 1567 on the foundations of the pre-existing construction. Since the earlier church had already been built to the height of the ground floor in 1555, there was no way for the Jesuits to expand the structure to hold the increasing number of students attending the Collegio Romano. The facade was very similar to that of the contemporary Church of the Gesù designed by Giacomo della Porta with involvement by Giovanni Tristano. In accordance with the wishes of the marchesa, the façade proudly displayed the Orsini arms. The Church of the Annunciation was enlarged in 1580 when Pope Gregory XIII expanded the Collegio Romano itself, especially the side chapels.

The old church became insufficient for over 2,000 students of many nations who were attending the College at the beginning of the 17th century. Pope Gregory XV, who was an old pupil of the Collegio Romano, was strongly attached to the church. Following the canonization of Ignatius of Loyola in 1622, he suggested to his nephew, Cardinal Ludovico Ludovisi, that a new church dedicated to the founder of the Jesuits should be erected at the college itself. The young cardinal accepted the idea, asked several architects to draw plans, among them Carlo Maderno. Ludovisi finally chose the plans drawn up by the Jesuit mathematician, Orazio Grassi, professor at the Collegio Romano itself.

The foundation stone was laid only on 2 August 1626, four years later, a delay which was caused by the fact that a section of the buildings belonging to the Roman College had to be dismantled. The old church was eventually demolished in 1650 to make way for the massive Church of St. Ignatius of Loyola, which was begun in 1626 and finished only at the end of the century. In striking contrast to the Church of the Annunciation, which occupied only a small section of the Collegio Romano, the Church of St. Ignatius of Loyola took up a quarter of the entire block when it was completed.

The church was opened for public worship only in 1650, at the occasion of the Jubilee of 1650. The final solemn consecration of the church was celebrated only in 1722 by Cardinal Antonfelice Zondadari. The church's entrance now faces on to the Rococo Place of San Ignazio was planned by the architect Filippo Raguzzini.

== Interior ==
The church has a Latin cross plan with numerous side chapels. The building was inspired by the Jesuit mother church, the Church of the Gesù in Rome (finished in the late 16th century). The imposing order of Corinthian pilasters that rings the entire interior, the theatrical focus on the high altar at the rear of the broad eastern apse, the church's colored marbles, animated stucco figural relief, richly ornamented altars, extensive gilding, and bold trompe-l'œil paintings in the "dome" at its crossing and in the nave ceiling all produce a festive, sumptuous effect. Funds to build a dome were lacking, hence a painter to paint the illusion of a dome was hired.

The nave's west wall has a sculptural group depicting Magnificence and Religion (1650) by Alessandro Algardi. Algardi also helped design the high reliefs in stucco that run on both lateral nave walls just above the entries to the chapels and beneath the nave's grandiose entablature.

Other artworks in the church include a huge stucco statue of St. Ignatius by Camillo Rusconi (1728). Saints Aloysius Gonzaga, Robert Bellarmine, and John Berchmans are buried in the church. The church is also the resting place of Bartol Kašić.

=== Frescoes of Andrea Pozzo ===
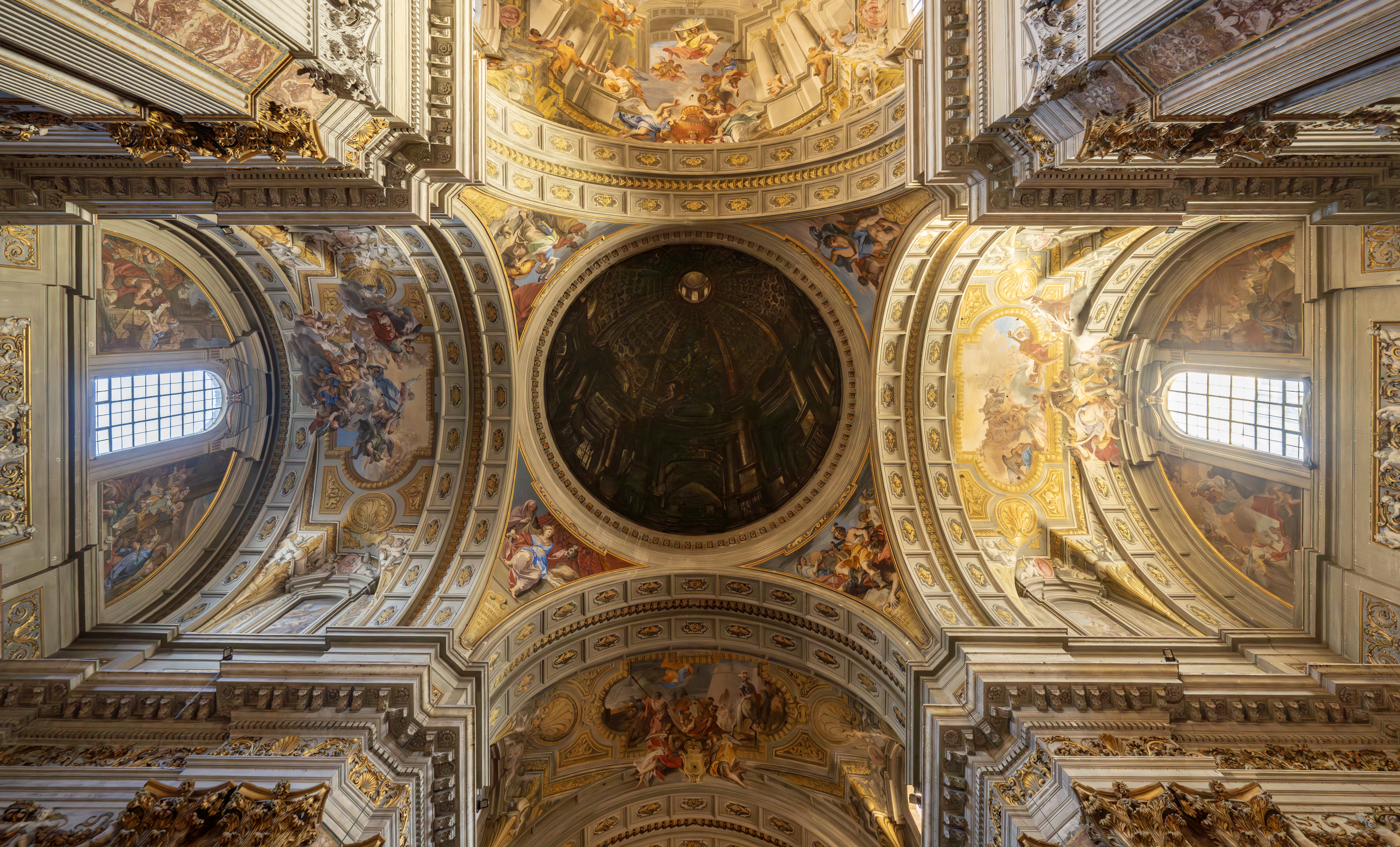
"Dome" of Sant'Ignazio

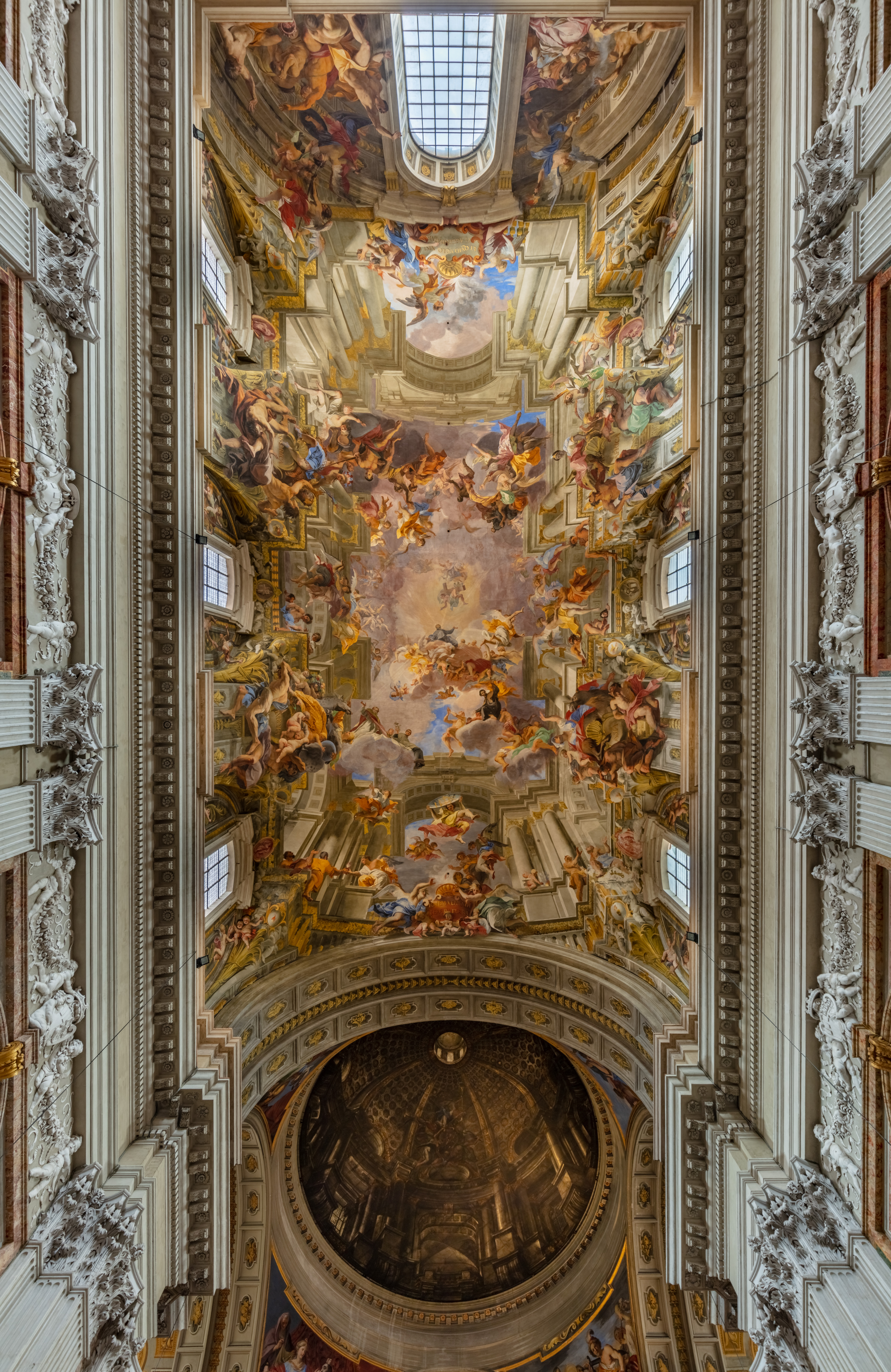
Andrea Pozzo's painted ceiling with trompe-l'œil architecture

Andrea Pozzo, a Jesuit lay brother, painted the grandiose fresco that stretches across the ceiling of the nave around 1685. It celebrates the work of Saint Ignatius and the Society of Jesus in the world presenting the saint welcomed into paradise by Christ and the Virgin Mary and surrounded by allegorical representations of all four continents.

By the skilful use of linear perspective, light, and shade, he made the great barrel-vault of the nave of the church into an idealized aula from which is seen the reception of St. Ignatius into the opened heavens. Pozzo worked to open up, even dissolve the actual surface of the nave's barrel vault to make the observer see a huge and lofty cupola (of a sort), open to the bright sky, and filled with upward floating figures. A marble disk set into the middle of the nave floor marks the ideal spot from which observers might fully experience the illusion.

A second marker in the nave floor further east provides the ideal vantage point for the trompe-l'œil painting on canvas that covers the crossing and depicts a tall, ribbed and coffered dome. The cupola one expects to see here was never built and in its place, in 1685, Andrea Pozzo supplied a painting on canvas with a projection of a cupola. The original painting, completed in 1685, was destroyed by fire; in 1823 it was faithfully reproduced by Francesco Manno on the basis of drawings and studies left by the Pozzo.

Pozzo also frescoed the pendentives in the crossing with Old Testament figures: Judith, David, Samson, and Jaele.

Pozzo also painted the frescoes in the eastern apse depicting the life and apotheosis of St Ignatius. The Siege of Pamplona in the tall panel on the left commemorates the wounding of Ignatius, which led to the convalescence that transformed his life. The panel over the high altar, Vision of St Ignatius at the Chapel of La Storta, commemorates the vision that gave the saint his divine calling. St Ignatius sends St Francis Xavier to India recalls the aggressive Jesuit missionary work in foreign countries, and finally, St Ignatius Receiving Francesco Borgia recalls the recruitment of the Spanish noble who would become General of the Company of Jesuits. Pozzo is also responsible for the fresco in the conch depicting St. Ignatius Healing the Pestilent.

=== Chapels ===
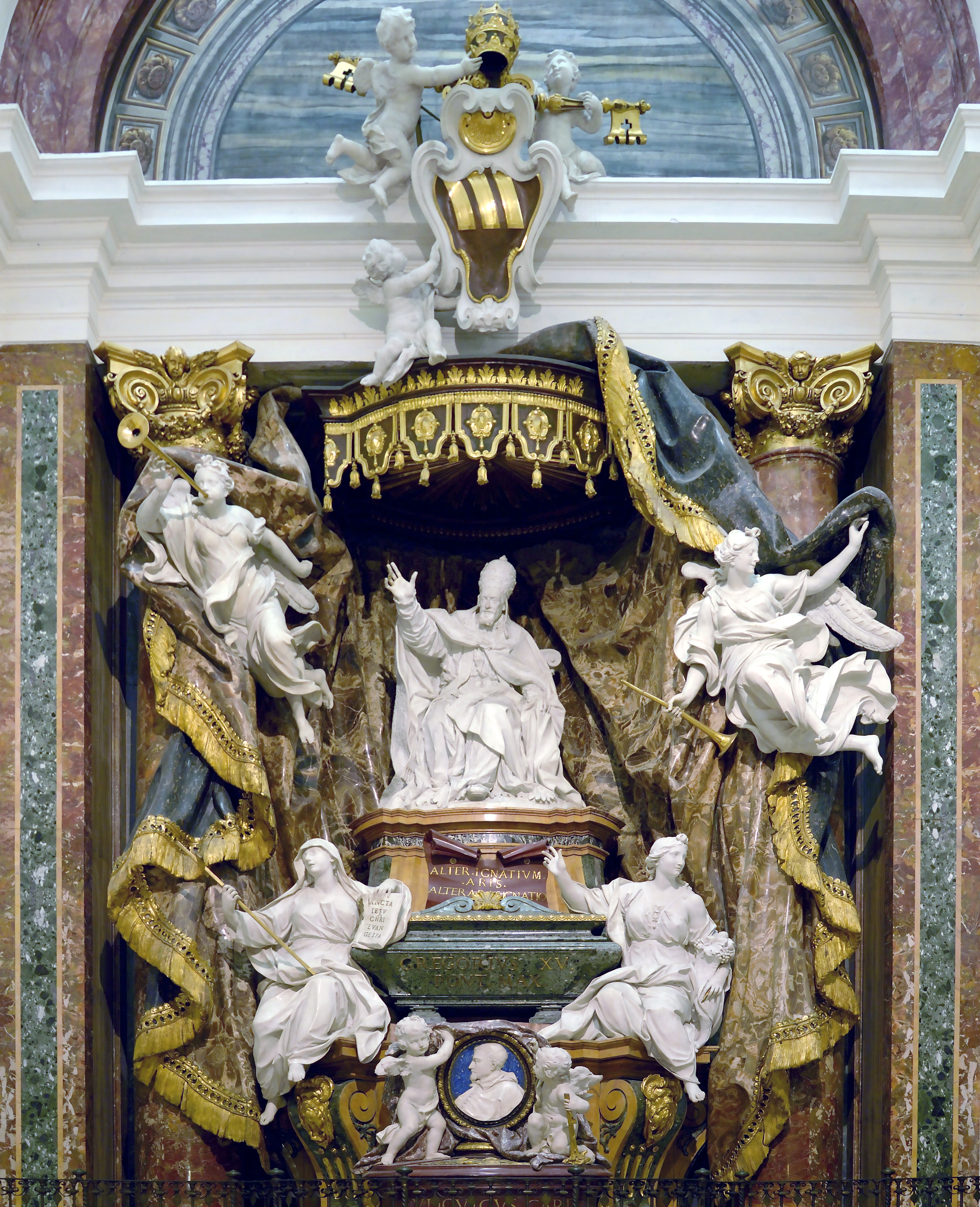
Monument to Pope Gregory XV and Cardinal Ludovisi (c. 1709-14) by Le Gros

The first chapel on the right has an 18th-century altarpiece showing Saints Stanislaus Kostka and John Francis Regis Worshiping the Virgin and Child. The second chapel has an altarpiece depicting St Joseph and Virgin and a lunette (right wall) depicting the Last Communion of St Luigi Gonzaga, both by Francesco Trevisani (1656–1746); the cupola was painted by Luigi Garzi. The third chapel has an 18th-century altarpiece of Presentation of the Virgin in the Temple by Stefano Pozzi.

The chapel in the right transept, dedicated to St. Aloysius Gonzaga, has a large marble high-relief depicting St. Aloysius Gonzaga in Glory (1697–99) by the French sculptor Pierre Le Gros. Andrea Pozzo painted the ceiling which also shows the Glory of the Saint. Buried in the side altar next to Gonzaga is Cardinal St. Robert Bellarmine.

The chapel in the left transept houses the relics of St. John Berchmans.

The chapel just to the right of the church's presbytery (at the south-east corner) houses the funerary monuments of Pope Gregory XV and his nephew, Cardinal Ludovico Ludovisi, the church's founder. Pierre Le Gros designed the monument and executed most of it himself c. 1709–14 with the exception of the two flying personifications of Fame which are by Pierre-Étienne Monnot.

The chapel in the left transept has a marble altarpiece of the Annunciation by Filippo Della Valle, with allegorical figures and angels (1649) by Pietro Bracci, and a frescoed ceiling with The Assumption by Pozzo. The second and first chapels to the left have paintings by Jesuit Pierre de Lattre, who also did the sacristy paintings.

== List of cardinal deacons ==
The cardinal deaconry of Sant Ignazio di Loyola a Campo Marzio was established 28 June 1991. Its cardinals include:

- Paolo Dezza, S.J. (28 June 1991 – 17 December 1999)
- Roberto Tucci, S.J. (21 February 2001 — 12 February 2011; as cardinal priest 21 February 2011 — 14 April 2015)
- Luis Francisco Ladaria Ferrer, S.J. (28 June 2018 - present)

== See also ==
- Category:Burials at Sant'Ignazio, Rome
- Churches of Rome
- Anamorphosis
- List of Jesuit sites
- 17th-century Western domes

== Gallery ==
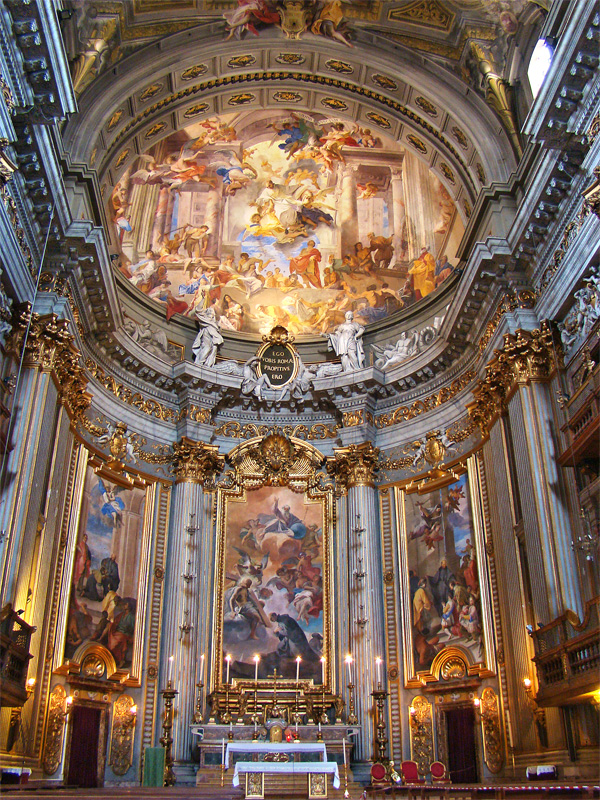
Apse

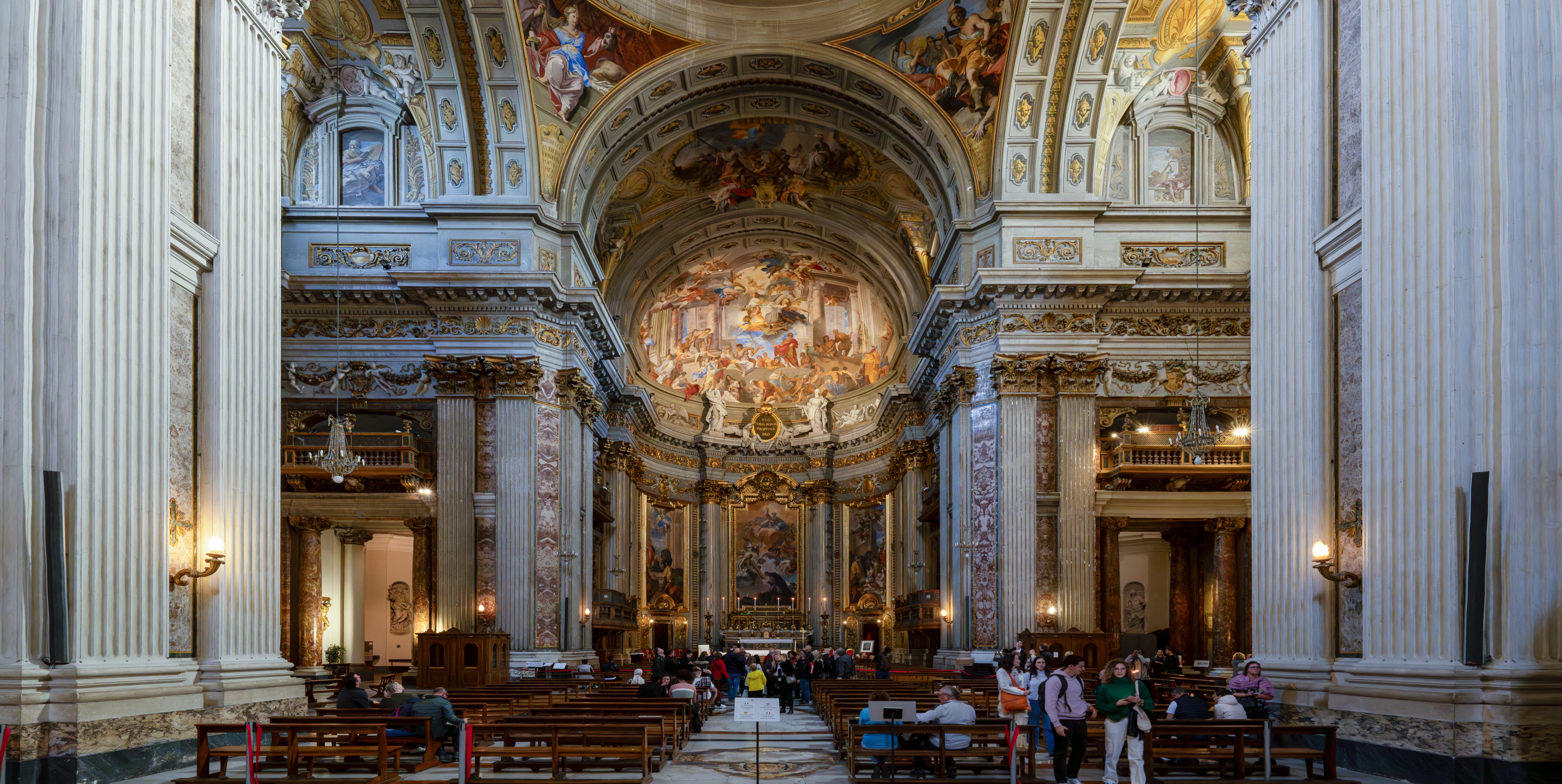
Interior

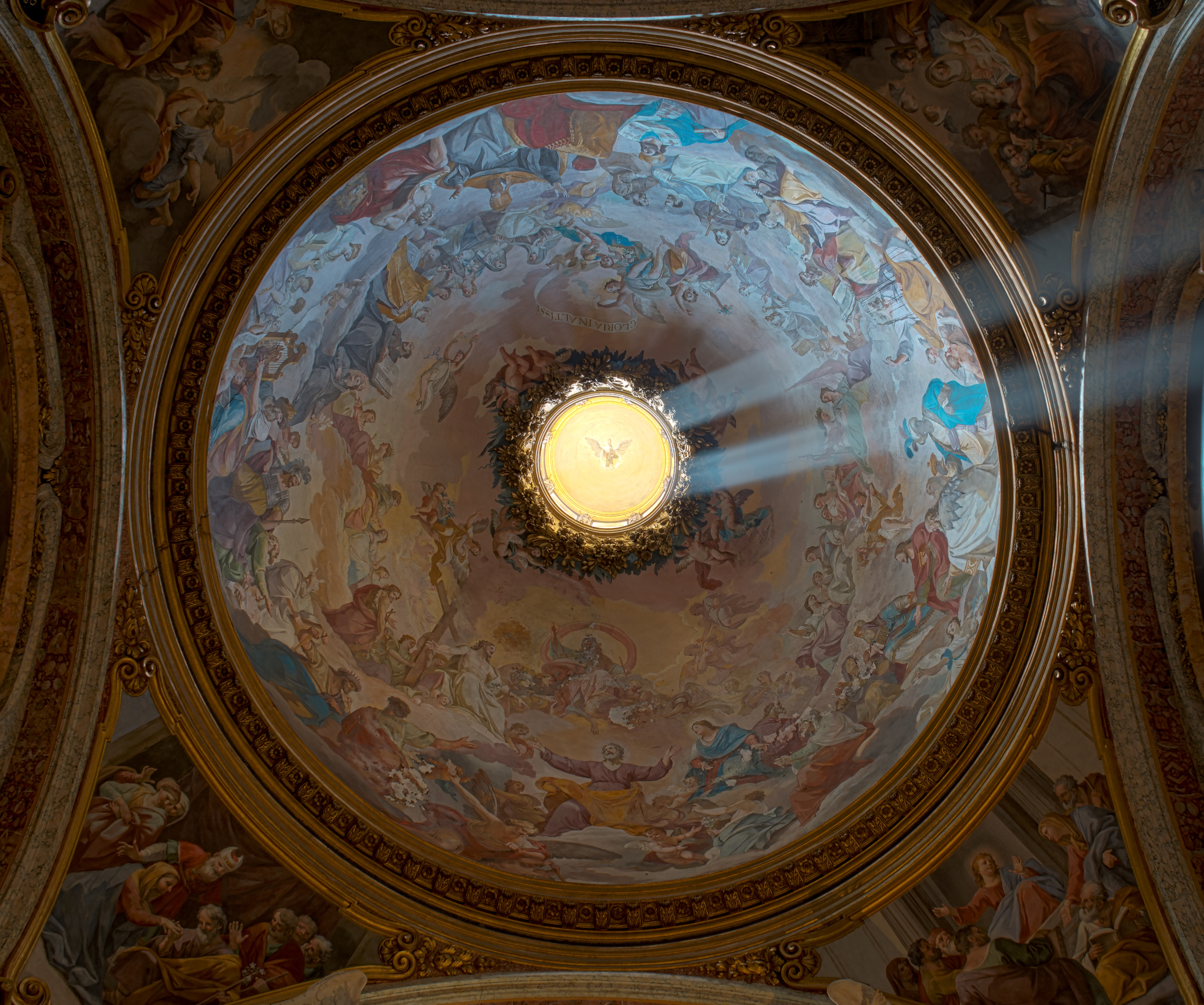
Bellarmine chapel dome

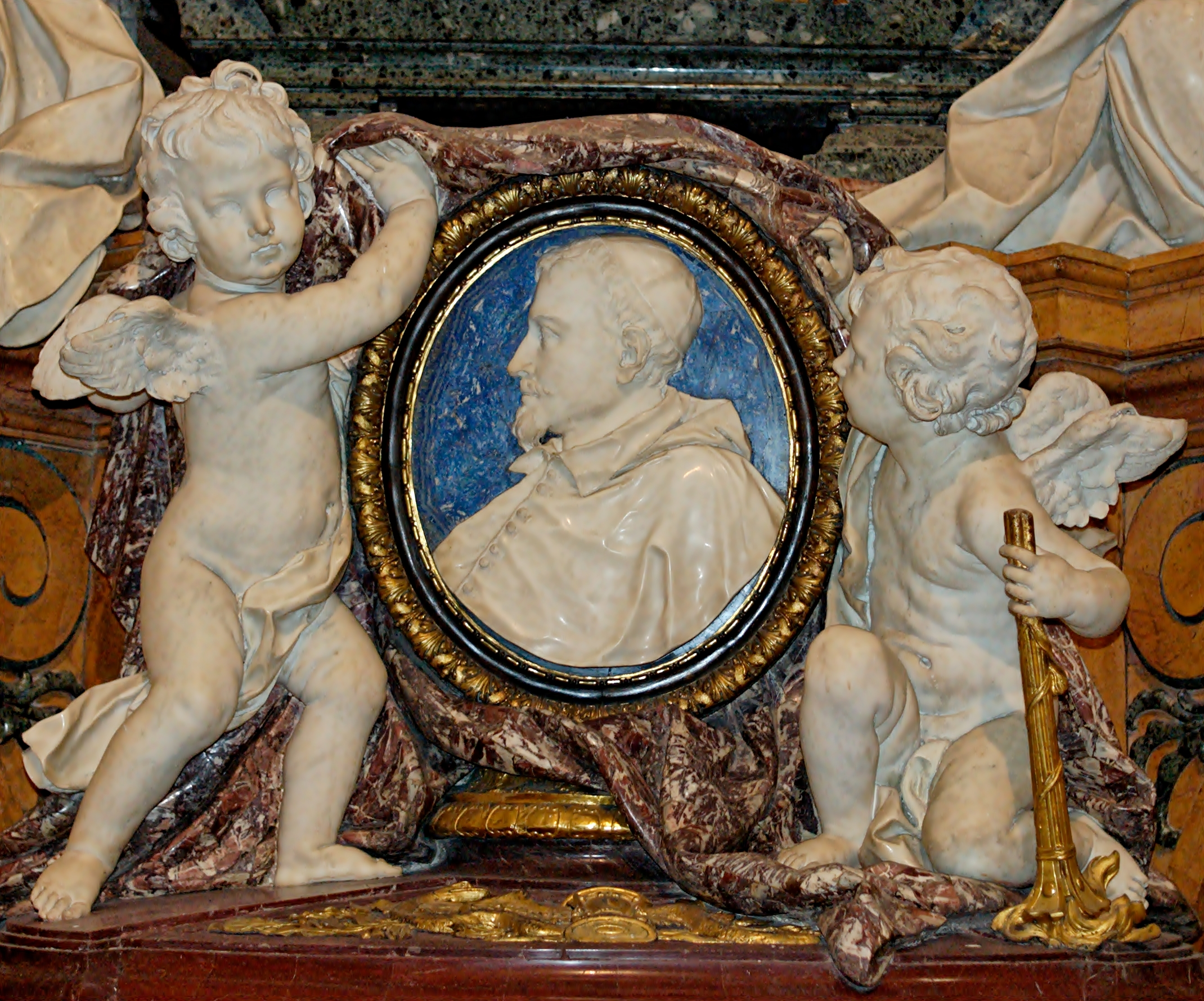
Medallion of Ludovico Ludovisi by Le Gros

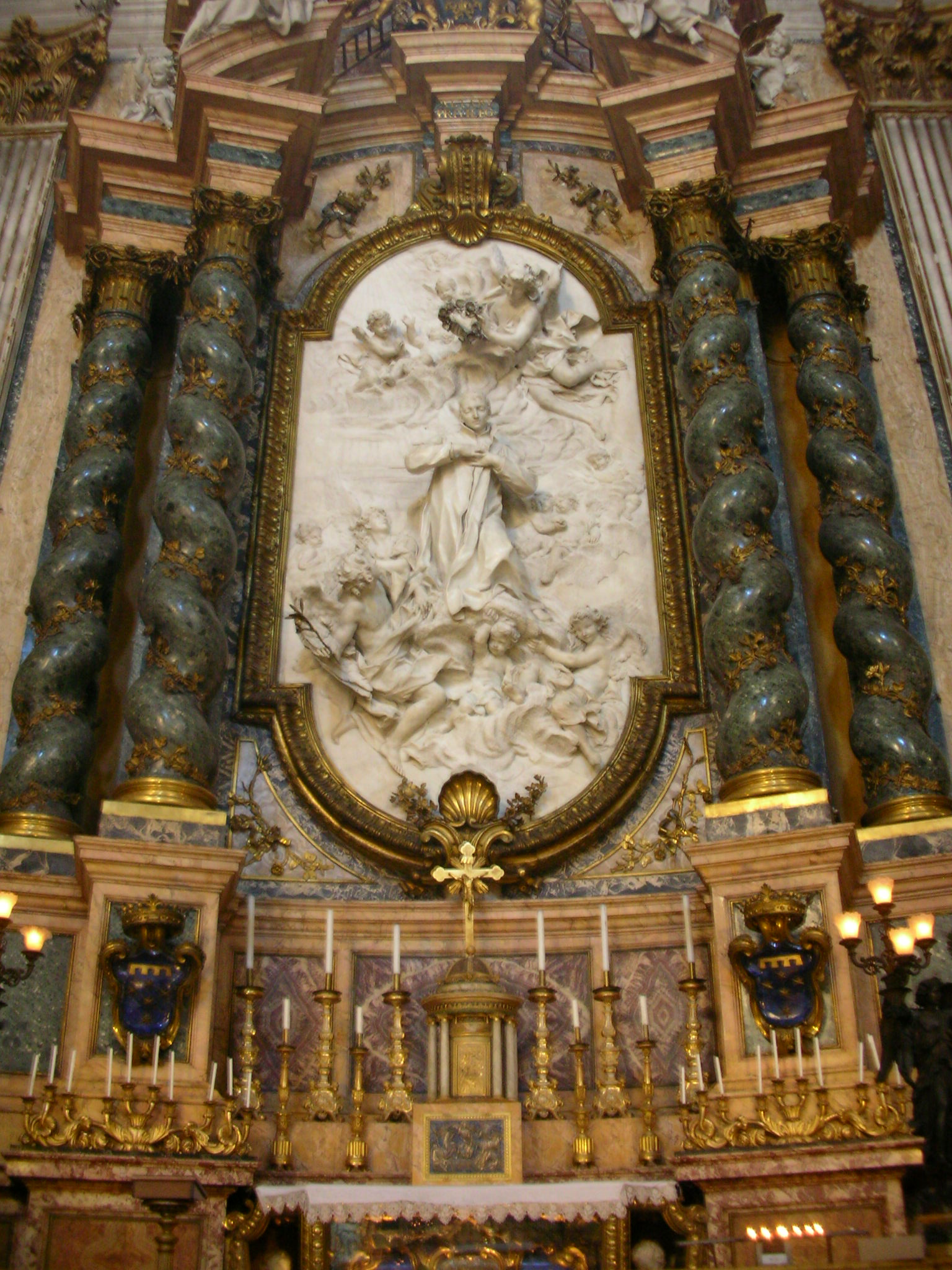
Glory of St Aloysius Gonzaga (1697–99) by Le Gros

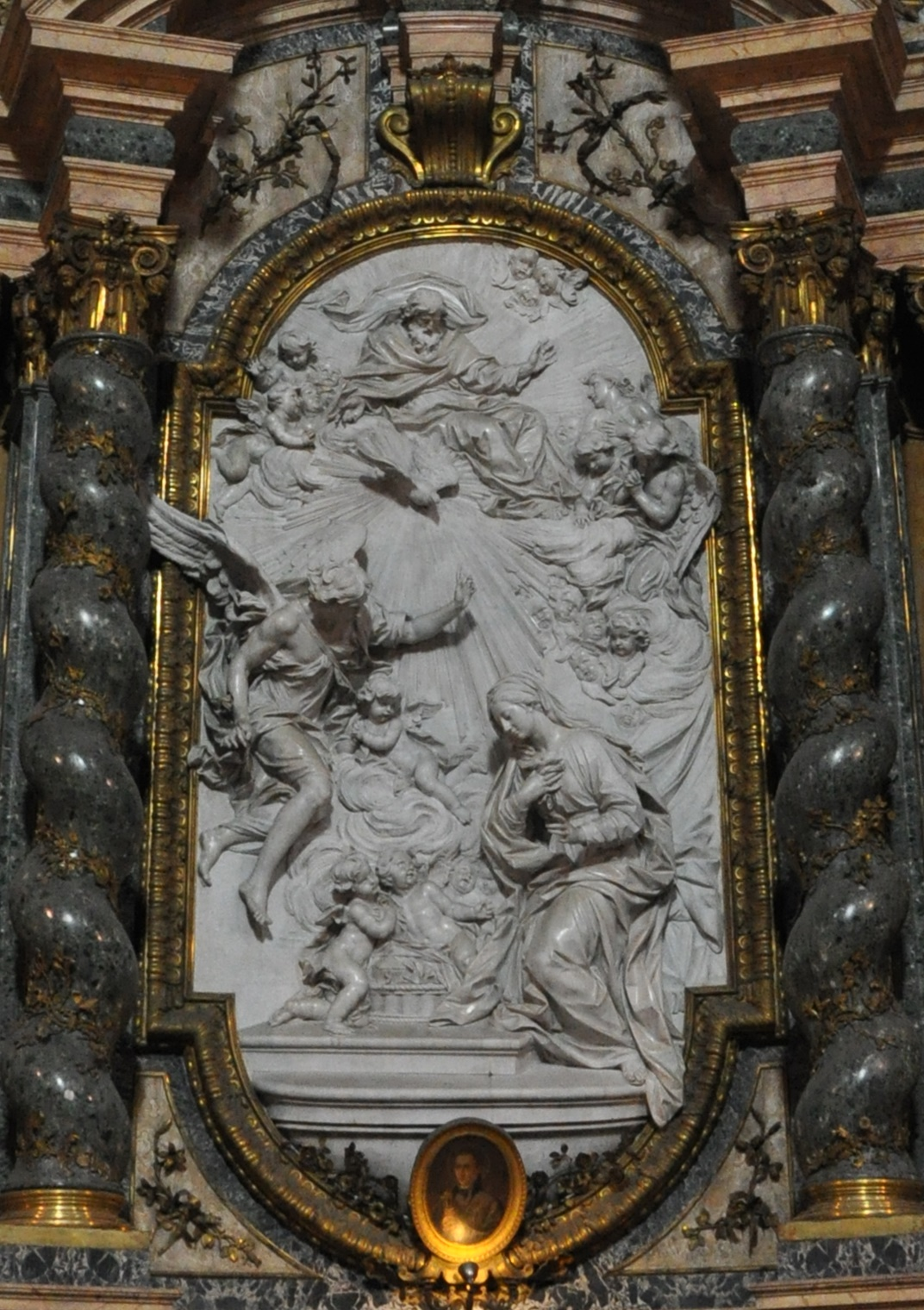
Annunciation (1750) by Della Valle

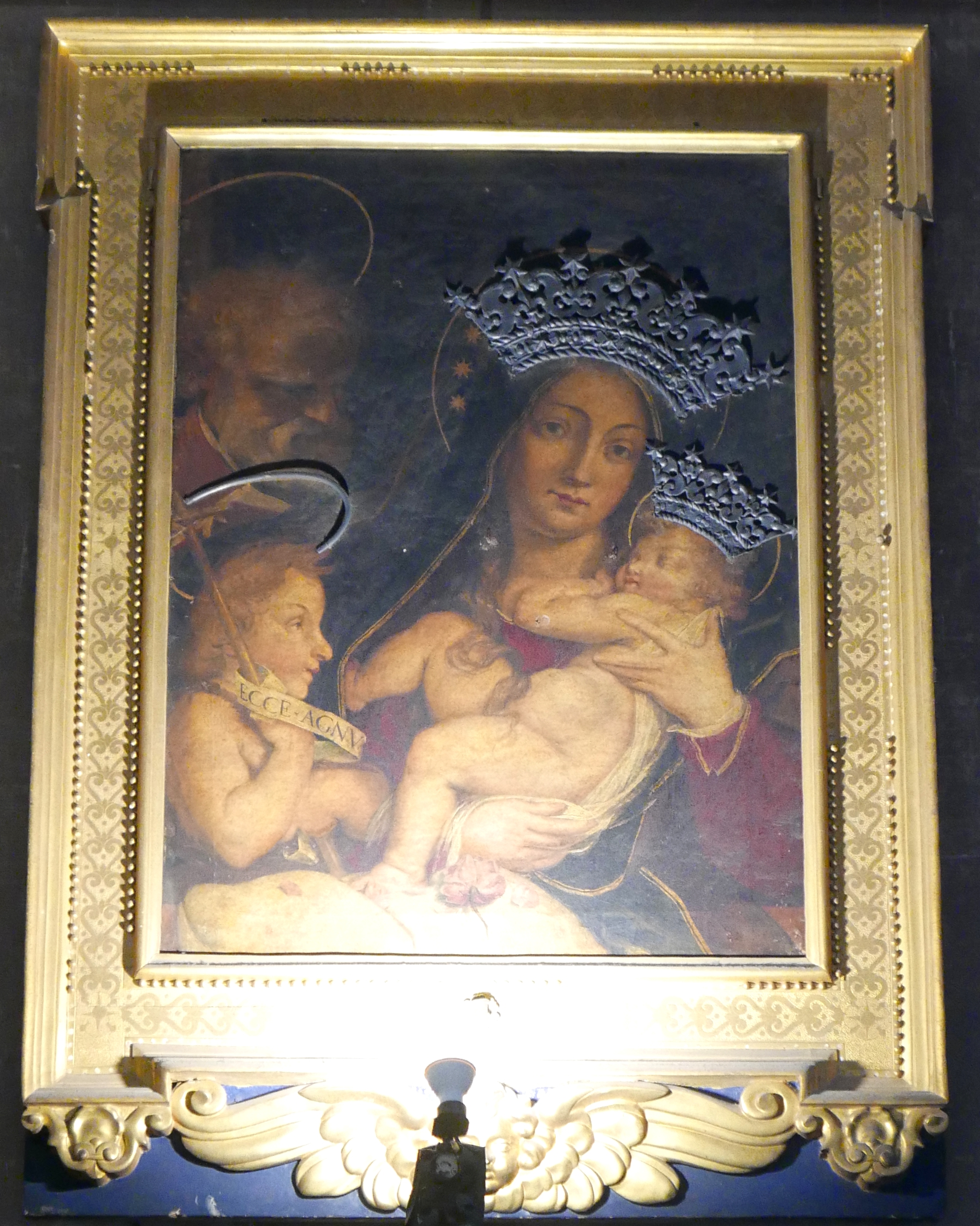
The icon of the Holy Family, the Madonna and Child was canonically crowned on 1676 as authorized by Pope Clement X

== Bibliography ==
- Remigio Marini, Andrea Pozzo pittore (Trent, 1959).
- N. Carbonieri, Andrea Pozzo architetto (Trent, 1961).
- B. Canestro Chiovenda, "Della “Gloria di s. Ignazio” e di altri lavori del Gaulli per i gesuiti," Commentari 13 (1962), 290 ff.
- Zaccaria Carlucci, La chiesa di S. Ignazio di Loyola in Roma ([Roma] : [Chiesa di S. Ignazio], [1995]).
- Evonne Levy, Propaganda and the Jesuit Baroque (Berkeley-Los Angeles: University of California Press, 2004).
