= Roberto Tucci =

Catholic cardinal

His Eminence Roberto Tucci SJ
- Cardinal-Priest of Sant'Ignazio di Loyola a Campo Marzio
- Predecessor: Paolo Dezza
- Successor: Luis Ladaria Ferrer

Orders
- Ordination: 24 August 1950
- Created cardinal: 21 February 2001
- Rank: Cardinal deacon (2001–2011); Cardinal priest (2011–2015)

Personal details
- Born: Roberto Tucci; 19 April 1921 Naples, Italy
- Died: 14 April 2015 (aged 93) Rome, Italy
- Denomination: Roman Catholic
- Motto: In fide et caritate
- Coat of arms

Styles of Roberto Tucci
- Reference style: His Eminence
- Spoken style: Your Eminence
- Informal style: Cardinal

Roberto Tucci, SJ (19 April 1921 – 14 April 2015) was an Italian Catholic theologian, journalist, and Jesuit priest. He played an important role at the Second Vatican Council and organized foreign trips taken by Pope John Paul II. He was made a cardinal in 2001, and continued to prefer being addressed as "Padre Tucci".

== Biography ==
Roberto Tucci was born in Naples, Italy, on 19 April 1921 to Mario Tucci, an Italian, and Eugenia Watt Lega, an Englishwoman and an Anglican. He received his baptism in the Anglican Church and, at the age of 13, was baptized conditionally in Catholic Church on 22 March 1934.

Tucci entered the Jesuit novitiate at the age of 15, on 1 October 1936. He earned a licentiate in sacred theology from the Pontifical University of Louvain, where the issues that would be the subject of the Second Vatican Council were already being discussed. He earned a doctorate in sacred theology from the Pontifical Gregorian University in Rome.

He was ordained a priest on 24 August 1950. He taught at the San Luigi Papal Theological Seminary of Southern Italy in Naples for two years. He founded the journal Digest religioso (later renamed Rassegna di Teologia).

He was a member of the preparatory commission on lay apostolate of the Second Vatican Council. He participated in the Council as a peritus (theological expert) and contributed to the drafting of two of the Council's key documents, Ad gentes and Gaudium et spes (both 1965). Vatican Radio described his work on the final edition of the Council's pastoral constitution Gaudium et spes as "invaluable". (Note: Avvenire notes his contribution to Lumen gentium as well.) During the Council's second, third, and fourth sessions, he was one of a trio of Italian clerics who held daily press briefings. At the Council he became friends with Cardinal Karol Wojtyła, the future Pope John Paul II. Following the Council he was active in promoting its documents and was especially devoted to ecumenism, publishing widely reprinted essays. He was the first Catholic priest to be invited to give a talk at the General Assembly of the World Council of Churches, in Uppsala, Sweden, in July 1968.

He was a consultor to the Pontifical Council for Social Communications from 1965 until 1989. There he helped draft Communio et Progressio (1971), which outlined the Church's relationship with the communications media.

Tucci was vice-president of the Italian Catholic Union of the Press from 1961 to 1982. He served as secretary general of the Italian province of the Jesuits from 1967 to 1969 and as an advisor to the Jesuit superior general, Father Pedro Arrupe from 1970 to 1975.

He joined the staff of the Jesuit periodical La Civiltà Cattolica in 1956 and was its editor from 1959 to 1973, where he worked to make the content more varied and international, less polemical and more journalistic. He cultivated young Jesuits who went on to distinguished careers, including Bartolomeo Sorge, Giovanni Caprile, Giovanni Rulli, Giuseppe De Rosa, and Carlo Maria Martini, later cardinal archbishop of Milan. He was the director general of Vatican Radio from 1973 to 1985 and chaired its administrative committee from 1986 to 2001. He was responsible for press relations surrounding the release of the encyclical Redemptor Hominis in 1979.

He was a member of the board of directors of Georgetown University in Washington, D.C., from 1977 to 1983.

From 1982 to 2001 Tucci was responsible for scheduling and participating in 77 of the 79 trips Pope John Paul II made outside Italy. One study of the Vatican during these years offers this portrait of Tucci:

Tucci, a gregarious prelate in charge of organizing these trips, was a favorite of Vatican journalists. A big man with an oversized head, he looked like a country farmer.... No one would have guessed he was a Jesuit. He had a down-to-earth style of talking and a bluntness that had occasionally gotten him in trouble with the Vatican's diplomats. He seemed to lack the discretion that made most Vatican diplomats such bad interviews.

He was made cardinal deacon of Sant'Ignazio di Loyola a Campo Marzio in the consistory of 21 February 2001. The pope granted him a dispensation from the rule that all cardinals be ordained bishops. For two months, until his 80th birthday, he was eligible to participate in a papal conclave though not a bishop.

On 21 February 2011, he opted for the order of cardinal priest, and his diaconal church was elevated to the rank of titular church.

In 2012, his early diaries were published as Giovanni XXIII e la preparazione del Concilio Vaticano II nei diari ineditii del direttore della «Civiltà cattolica» padre Roberto Tucci (John XXIII and the preparation of the Second Vatican Council, the unpublished diaries of the director of "Civiltà Cattolica" Father Roberto Tucci). His account of editorial battles between different generations of Jesuits at his magazine mirrors that of the Council fathers.

Beginning in 2013, Tucci's health declined for several years and he died in a Rome clinic on 14 April 2015 at the age of 93. He was entombed in the Jesuit chapel in Rome's Campo Verano Cemetery.

The French government awarded him the Légion d'honneur in 1976 and he was named Commandeur des Arts et des Lettres in 2009. He was awarded an honorary doctor of law degree by the University of Notre Dame in 1966.
