= Fulvio Androzzi =

16th-century Italian Jesuit devotional writer

Fulvio Androzzi or Androzio (1523–1575) was an Italian Jesuit and author of devotional literature.

== Life ==
Androzzi was born in 1523 in Montecchio (since renamed Treia), in the province of Macerata. He bore the title doctor of both laws, probably having graduated from the University of Camerino, and became vicar general to Berardo Bongiovanni, Bishop of Camerino, and was appointed to a canonry in the Basilica della Santa Casa in Loreto. In December 1555 he joined the Society of Jesus, founded just 15 years previously, and returned to Marche as an itinerant missionary. From late 1557 he was rector of the Jesuit college in Florence, and from 1561 of the college in Ferrara. He was professed of the fourth vow in Ferrara on 14 September 1562.

He was active helping victims of the plague in 1570–1571, and began the extension of the college buildings (completed in 1580). He died in Ferrara on 27 August 1575.

== Writings ==
After Androzzi's death, his manuscript writings were prepared for publication by Francesco Adorno, rector of the Jesuit college in Padua, and were printed in Milan at the press of Pacifico Pontio in 1579, under the title Opere spirituali del R. P. Fulvio Androtio della Compagnia di Gesù. This contained a meditation on the life and passion of Christ, a treatise on frequent communion, and a treatise on widowhood and the spiritual life. The collection went through many reprints between 1580 and 1626, in Milan, Venice and Naples, and individual treatises were translated into all the major languages of Western Europe.

Editions and translations

- Opere Spirituali, vol. 2 Della Frequentia della Communione (Venice, Ziletti, 1580)
- Devot memorial des saints mysteres de la mort et passion de nostre sauveur et redempteur Jesus Christ, translated by Antoine Gazet (Arras, Jean Bourgeois, 1595)
- Traictè de la frequente communion et des fruicts qui en procedent, translated by Antoine Gazet (Douai, Jan Bogard, 1599)
- Onderwys oft practycke om dikwils het H. Sacrament des Autaers profytelyck te nutten, translated by Nicolaus Burenus (Antwerp, Willem Lesteens, 1618)
