= Henricus Sedulius =

Belgian Franciscan scholar

- Henri de Vroom

Personal life
- Born: 1547 Kleve
- Died: 1621 (aged 73–74) Antwerp
- Notable work(s): Apologeticus aduersus Alcoranum Franciscanorum, pro Libro Confirmitatum; Conformities; Historia seraphica; Icones sanctae Clarae B. Francisci Assisiatis primigeniae discipulae
- Known for: Theological works

Religious life
- Religion: Roman Catholic
- Order: Franciscan

Henricus Sedulius (1547-1621) – the Latinized name of Henri de Vroom van Kleef – was a Belgian Franciscan scholar noted for his works on religious figures such as the lives of St. Elziarius and St. Francis of Assisi. He also published works that defended the Franciscan order.

Sedulius was also a poet.

== Background ==
Sedulius was born in Kleve, Germany. He died in 1621 at Antwerp.

== Works ==
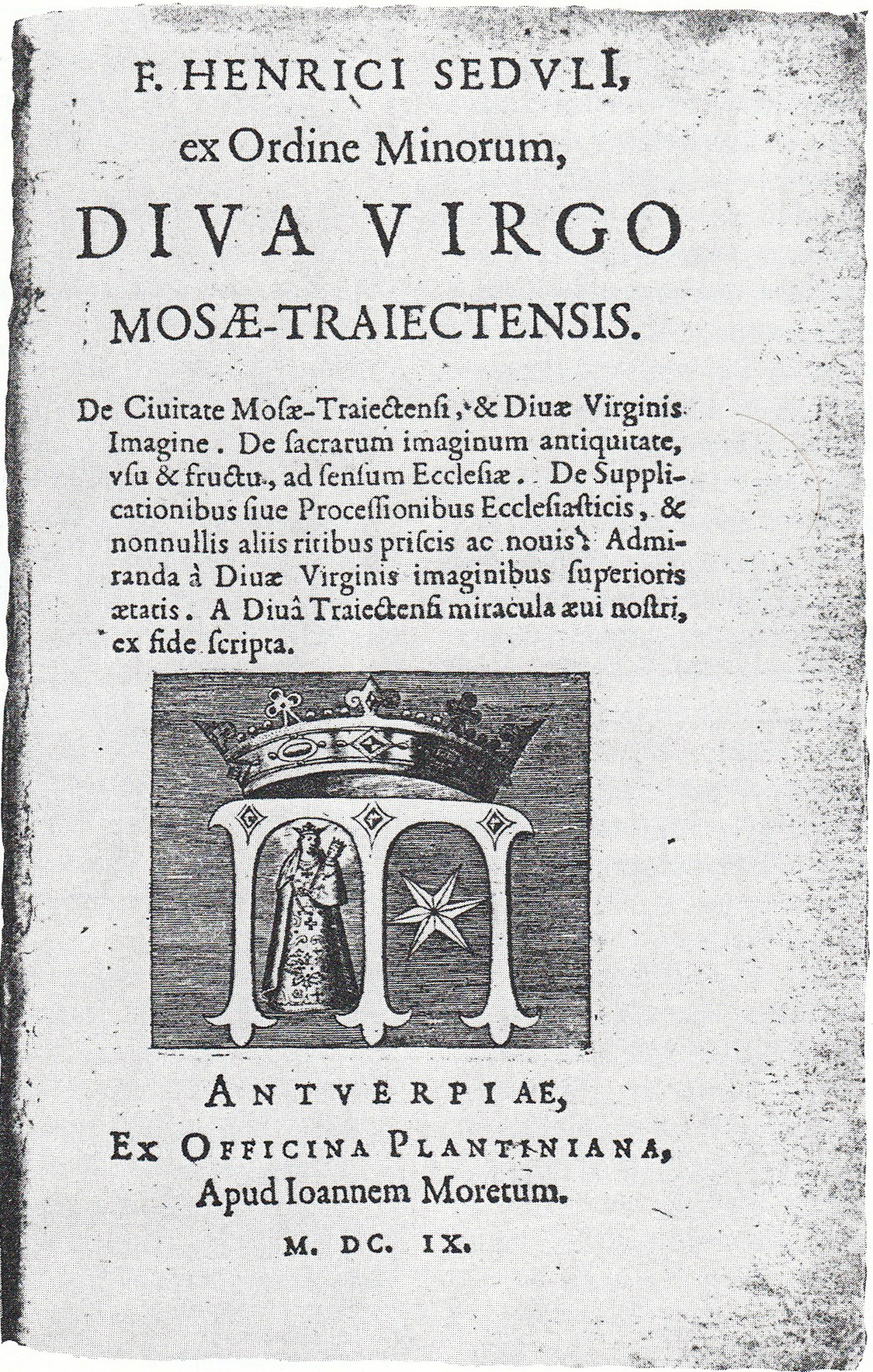
Diva Virgo Mosæ-Traiectensis, a devotional booklet written by Henricus Sedulius

In 1607, Sedulius published the Apologeticus aduersus Alcoranum Franciscanorum, pro Libro Conformitatum. This is a defense of the Franciscan Order, drawing from Bartholomew Albizzi's commentary of the Scripture as well as citations from the Christian founders and ancient philosophers. Particularly, his arguments were directed against Erasmus Alber's criticisms included in the text called Conformities.

In Historia seraphica, Sedulius published a collection of quotes from famous writers who praised St. Francis and these included St. Bonaventure as well as other prominent Franciscans. In an account, Sedulius said he relied on the former's collected works (constituting eight volumes) that were published by the Typographia Vaticana from 1588 to 1596. Historia likened St. Francis to an angel, introducing the book with a quote from the Book of Revelation: "And I saw another angel ascending from the east, having the seal of the living God." Sedulius also wrote the Icones sanctae Clarae B. Francisci Assisiatis primigeniae discipulae and the Imagines Sanctorum Francisci, which is an illustrated collection of various saints. Sedulius collaborated with Jan Moretus, the owner of Plantin Press, on the publication of several religious texts.

An account described how Sedulius' interest in history emerged during his stay in Italy and Tyrol. In addition to religious texts, Sedulius also covered historical events such as the martyr stories (e.g. Gorcum martyrs) during the Eighty Years' War. There are texts, including versions by other authors, that contained an engraved portrait of the author or portraits engraved by owners who thought that Sedulius was the author. Some of Sedulius' poems focused on miracles such as Diva Virgo Mosae-Traiectensis and his style is said to have been influenced by Justus Lipsius.

Sedulius is said to have written his works mostly in Latin and has worked with his colleague Cornelius Thielmans on translated versions.
