= Edward Coffin =

Edward Coffin (alias Hatton) (1570 – 17 April 1626) was an English Jesuit.

== Life ==
Coffin was born at Exeter in 1571, and arrived at the English college at Rheims on 19 July 1585. He left that city for Ingoldstadt on 7 November 1586, in company with Robert Turner, who defrayed the cost of his education. On 26 July 1588, he entered the English college at Rome. Having been ordained priest on 13 March 1592–3, he was sent to England on 10 May 1594, and he entered the Society of Jesus in this country on 13 January 1597–8.

In the Lent of 1598, on his way to the novitiate in Flanders, travelling with Thomas Lister, he was seized by the Dutch, near Antwerp, and taken to England, where he was imprisoned for five years, and was sent back to England, where he spent his novitiate and the first five years of his religious life in prison, chiefly in the Tower of London (the Beauchamp tower). On the accession of James I, "as a favour," he was sent with a large number of other ecclesiastics into perpetual banishment. Repairing to Rome, he acted for nearly twenty years as confessor to the English college. He then resolved to return to his native country, and left Rome for Flanders, but at St. Omer he was taken ill and died in Saint-Omer's College on 17 April 1626.

He edited the posthumous reply of Robert Persons to William Barlow, bishop of Lincoln, entitled A Discussion of Mr. Barlowes Answer to the Book entitled the Judgment of a Catholic Englishman concerning the Oath of Allegiance, St. Omer, 1612, 4to. Coffin wrote the elaborate preface, which occupies 120 pages.

After studies at Reims and Ingolstadt he was ordained at the English College, Rome, and sent to England.

== Works ==
He wrote:

- the preface to Robert Persons's "Discussion of Mr. Barlowe's Answer" (Saint-Omer, 1612),
- Refutation of Hall, Dean of Worcester's "Discourse for the Marriage of Ecclesiastical Persons" (1619),
- "Art of Dying Well", from the Latin of Robert Bellarmine (1621);
- "True Relation of Sickness and Death of Cardinal Bellarmine", by C.E. of the Society of Jesus (1622), tr. into Latin,
- De Morte, etc. (Saint-Omer 1623 8vo.);
- Marci Antonii de Dominis Palinodia (Saint-Omer, 1623), tr. by Fletcher in 1827 as "My Motives for Renouncing the Protestant Religion";
- De Martyrio PP. Roberts, Wilson et Napper (Stonyhurst MSS., Anglia, III, n. 103).
