= Israel Zolli =

Chief rabbi of Rome who later converted to Catholicism (born 1881)

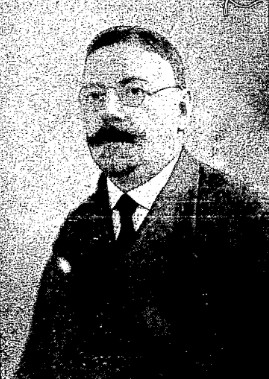
- Born: Israel Anton Zoller; 27 September 1881; Brody, Austria-Hungary
- Died: 2 March 1956 (aged 74); Rome, Italy
- Other name: Eugenio Maria Zolli
- Occupations: Chief Rabbi in Rome, Italy (1940–1945); Catholic university professor and author

Eugenio Maria Zolli (27 September 1881 ‒ 2 March 1956), born Israel Anton Zoller, was an Austrian by birth, and an Italian doctorate professor of philosophy and author. Until his conversion from Judaism to Catholicism in February 1945, Zolli was the chief rabbi in Rome's Jewish community from 1940 to 1945. After the war, he taught philosophy at a number of institutions throughout Rome including the Sapienza University of Rome and Pontifical Biblical Institute.

Zolli is noted for his admiration of Pope Pius XII during World War II, who gave support and shelter to Zolli and other Jews during Nazi Germany's occupation of Italy from 1943 to 1944. It was later revealed that Zolli hid in a number of places in both Rome and the Vatican City State.

== Early years and rabbinate ==
Zoller was born in 1881 in the city of Brody in then-Austria-Hungary, which from 1918 to 1945 was in eastern Poland, and currently is in western Ukraine. He was the youngest of five children, with three brothers and a sister. Zoller's father was a formerly wealthy factory owner, and his mother came from a family dynasty of rabbis. He earned a doctorate degree in philosophy from the University of Florence in Italy. At the same time, he prepared for the rabbinate at a nearby yeshiva.

In 1917, Zoller's first wife, Adele, died. In 1920, he married his second wife, Eva Majonica. She was born in the town of Gorizia, in northeast Italy.

In 1918, he was appointed rabbi of the Italian city of Trieste, whose territory had just been transferred from Austria-Hungary to Italy. He changed his surname to "Zolli" to make it sound more Italian. Italian fascist leaders began excluding Italian Jews from social welfare programs, including financial support and schooling, throughout the 1930s and denigrated them in the press. A vicious press campaign by the fascists forced out the Chief Rabbi of Rome, Davide Prato. In December 1939, Zolli was named as chief rabbi of Rome with the support of fascist leaders.

Zolli had conflict with his congregants in Rome from the start. Zolli's presiding style in delivering the liturgy was more casual than they preferred, and he was more interested in academic inquiry than pastoral work or community leadership. There were disputes over salary and expectations. During this time, Zolli formed a friendship with Jesuit scholar Augustin Bea.

== Holocaust of Rome: 1943–1944 ==
After Zolli moved to Rome in 1940, he attempted to convince Ugo Foa, President of the Jewish Community in Rome, and Dante Almansi, President of the Union of Italian Jewish Communities, that German Nazis were a significant threat to the Roman Jewish community. According to American researcher, Daniel T. Murphy, Zolli "recommended the total suppression of public Jewish functions, the closing of administrative offices, the elimination of donor lists, the dispersion of all members of the Jewish community, the distribution of financial aid, and the reduction of the community treasury." In the next few years, as the Nazis swept over Europe during World War II, all three of Zolli's brothers were killed in The Holocaust.

In 1944, after Zolli emerged from hiding in the house of Amadeo Pierantoni, a Catholic member of Rome's anti-fascist resistance party, Giustizia e Libertà, his position as chief rabbi was restored by Charles Poletti, although the Jewish community rebuffed him, as seen in Rabbi Louis Israel Newman's book, A Chief Rabbi of Rome becomes a Catholic.

Zolli later described his wartime experiences as follows:

It was from my father that I learned the great art of praying with tears. During the Nazi persecution, long years afterward, I lived near the center of Rome in a small room. There, in the dark, in hunger and cold, I would pray weeping: 'O, Thou keeper of Israel, protect the remnants of Israel; do not allow this remnant of Israel to perish!'

== Conversion to Catholicism ==
In his autobiography, Before the Dawn: Autobiographical Reflections by Eugenio Zolli, Former Chief Rabbi of Rome, Zolli said that while presiding over the religious service in the synagogue on the holy day of Yom Kippur in 1944, he experienced a vision of Jesus. Within his heart, he says, he found the words "You are here for the last time."

On 13 February 1945, Zolli, his second wife, and daughter converted to Catholicism (his first wife having died years earlier). He was baptized at Gregorian University by Mgr. Luigi Traglia in the presence of Father Paolo Dezza; his godfather was Father Augustin Bea, confessor of Pope Pius XII. Zolli chose to be christened "Eugenio Maria" in homage to Pope Pius XII, who was born Eugenio Maria Giuseppe Giovanni Pacelli.

After his conversion, Zolli was asked in an interview why he had "given up the Synagogue for the Church." Zolli responded saying, "But I have not given it up. Christianity is the completion or crown of the Synagogue. For, the Synagogue was a promise, and Christianity is the fulfillment of that promise. The Synagogue pointed to Christianity: Christianity presupposes the Synagogue. So you see, one cannot exist without the other. What I converted to was the living Christianity."

== Later years and death ==
After Zolli and his wife converted to Catholicism, he was employed at the Sapienza University of Rome and Pontifical Biblical Institute. In 1956, he became seriously ill and entered the hospital, where he reportedly revealed to a nun that he would die on the first Friday of the month at 3:00 in the afternoon. [source?]

On 2 March 1956, Zolli drifted into coma and later died. He was 74.

== Reception and legacy ==
After the controversy surrounding his conversion settled, Zolli's life and writings did not achieve widespread attention. His life and work were neglected, except for debate over Pope Pius XII and the Holocaust which arose in the 1960s. He continued to be forgotten until his autobiography was republished in Italian in 2004 and became a bestseller. This spurred a new body of scholarship on his life.

== Quotations ==
- "Conversion consists in responding to a call from God. A man is not converted at the time he chooses, but at the hour when he receives God's call. When the call is heard, he who receives it has only one thing to do: obey. Paul is 'converted'. Did he abandon the God of Israel? Did he cease to love Israel? It would be absurd to think so. But then? The convert is one who feels impelled by an irresistible force to leave a pre-established order and seek his own proper way. It would be easier to continue along the road he was on."
- "In the Old Testament, Justice is carried out by one man towards another...We do good for good received; we do harm for harm we have suffered at the hands of another. Not to do injury for injury is, in a certain fashion, to fall short of justice. What a contrast with the Gospel: Love your enemies... pray for them, or even Jesus' last words on the cross: 'Father, forgive them, for they know not what they are doing!' All this stupefied me. The New Testament is, in fact, an altogether new Covenant". (Eugenio Zolli)

== Works ==
- — (1907). Carlo Goldoni: discorso tenuto nel Teatro Mandanici di Barcellona [Carlo Goldoni: Lecture delivered at the Teatro Mandanici in Barcelona] (in Italian).
- —. L'educazione presso gli Ebrei [Education among the Jews]. Biblioteca dell'educatore (in Italian). Edizioni Viola.
- — (1913). La Coscrizione degli ebrei di Trieste nel 1788 [The Conscription of the Jews of Trieste in 1788] (in Italian). Typ. D. del Bianco.
- — (1925). Ideogenesi e morfologia dell'antico sinaitico: un contributo alla storia del divenire dell'alfabeto greco-romano [Ideogenesis and morphology of the ancient Sinaitic: A contribution to the origins of the Greco-Roman alphabet] (in Italian). Libraria Bemporad.
- — (1935). Israele: studi storico-religiosi [Israel: Historical-religious studies] (in Italian). Istituto delle edizioni accademiche.
- — (1935). Il Nazareno: studi di esegesi neotestamentaria alla luce dell'aramaico e del pensiero rabbinico [The Nazarene: Studies of New Testament exegesis in the light of Aramaic and rabbinic thought]. (Note: Published in 1935 according to Goldman (2015, p. 110), but 1938 according to Weisbord & Sillanpoa (1992))
  - — (2009). Latorre, Alberto (ed.). Il Nazareno: studi di esegesi neotestamentaria alla luce dell'aramaico e del pensiero rabbinico. Attualità e storia (in Italian). Milan: San Paolo. ISBN 978-88-215-6374-4.
  - — (1999). The Nazarene: Studies in New Testament Exegesis. City of peace: Studies in Catholic-Jewish relations. Translated by Vollert, Cyril. Urbi et Orbi/Remant of Israel. ISBN 978-1-892875-90-7.
- — (1945). Prima dell'alba [Before the Dawn].
  - — (1954). Before the Dawn: Autobiographical Reflections. Sheed and Ward.
  - — (2004). Latorre, Alberto (ed.). Prima dell'alba. Attualità e storia (in Italian). San Paolo. ISBN 978-88-215-5062-1.
- — (1946). Christus (in German). A.V.E.
- — (1947). Introduzione allo studio dell'ebraico anticotestamentario [Introduction to the study of Old Testament Hebrew] (in Italian). A. Belardetti.
- — (1951). Il Salterio: nuova traduzione e commento [The Psalms: A new translation and commentary] (in Italian). Viola.
- — (1953). I salmi: documenti di vita vissuta [The Psalms: Documents of lived experience] (in Italian). Ed. Viola.
- — (1953). L'ebraismo [Hebraisms]. Universale Studium, v. 22 (in Latvian). Editrice Studium.
- — (1954). Da Eva a Maria [From Eve to Mary] (in Italian). Editrice Studium Christi.
- —; Burgos, F.C. (1957). Mi encuentro con Cristo [My encounter with Christ]. Patmos: Libros de espiritualidad (in Spanish). Rialp.
- — (1960). Guida all'Antico e Nuovo Testamento [A guide to the Old and New Testaments]. Saper tutto (in Italian). Garzanti.
- — (1964). La confessione e il dramma di Pietro [Peter's confession and drama] (in Italian). Cor Unum.
- — (2005). Latorre, Alberto (ed.). Antisemitismo [Antisemitism]. Attualità e storia (in Spanish). San Paolo. ISBN 9788821554858.
