= Francis Adorno =

Italian preacher

Francis Adorno (1531 – January 13, 1586) was a celebrated Italian preacher.

== Life ==
Adorno was a member of the family of the last Doge of Genoa, and was born three years after the name of the Adorni was suppressed, and the office of Doge abolished. This measure was taken to put an end to the strife of 165 years between that family and the Fregosi, whose name also was changed. This political revolution was effected by Andrea Doria, the famous Genoese admiral.

Adorno entered the Society of Jesus in Portugal, whither he had been sent to pursue his studies. He was recalled to Rome, where he taught theology, and gained at the same time the reputation of being one of the greatest orators in Italy. He was the first rector of the College of Milan, and was subsequently charged with the administration of several houses of the Order. He was the friend, adviser, and confessor of Charles Borromeo.

Adorno died at Genoa.

== Works ==
Besides two volumes "De Disciplina Ecclesiasticâ", which he wrote at the request of Borromeo, there remain his sermons, some Latin verse, counsels to Herbert Foglieta "De Ratione Illustrandæ Ligurum Historiæ", and, in the Biblioteca Ambrosiana, a treatise on "Usury". He edited the manuscripts of his fellow Jesuit Fulvio Androzi for posthumous publication.
