= Joannes Busaeus =

Joannes Busaeus or Johannes Busius (1547–1611), also known as Jan Buys (Dutch) and Jean Busée (French), was a Catholic theologian from the Habsburg Netherlands who wrote in defence of the introduction of the Gregorian calendar in Germany, and produced the first printed edition of the Liber Pontificalis.

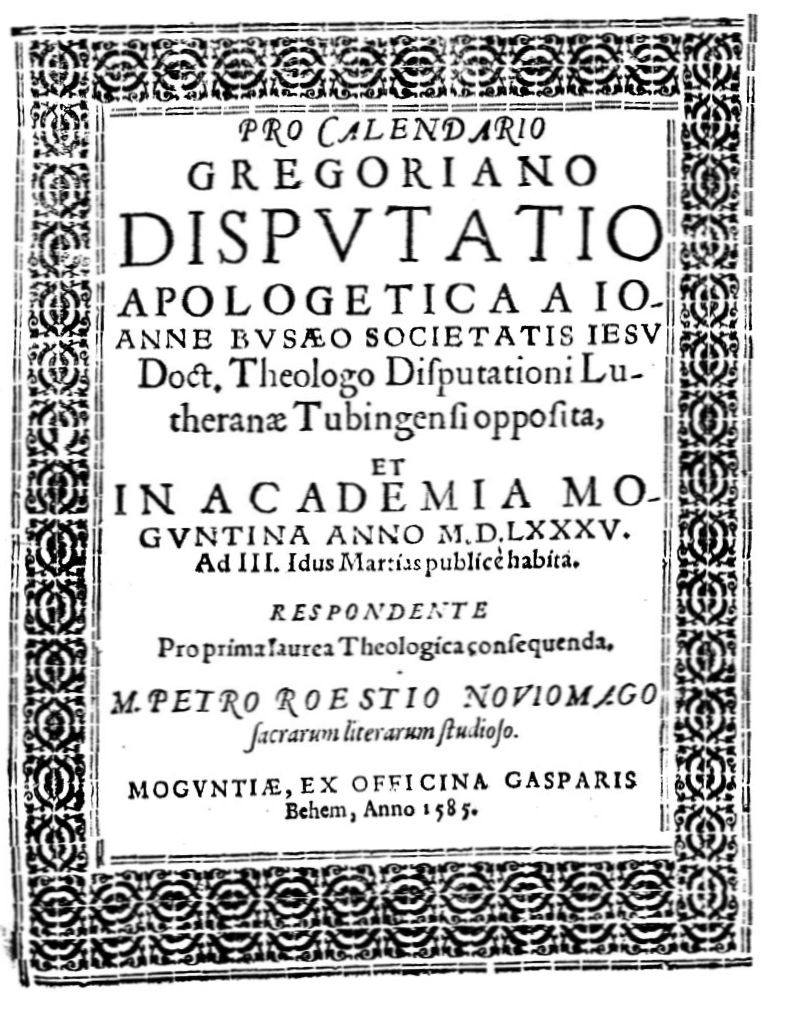
Pro calendario Gregoriano disputatio apologetica, 1585

== Life ==
Busaeus was born in Nijmegen on 14 April 1547. He entered the Society of Jesus in 1563. He was a student at the University of Mainz in the 1560s, and continued to teach Theology there until his death. He died in Mainz on 30 June 1611.

== Works ==
As author

- Pro calendario gregoriano disputatio apologetica (Mainz, Gaspar Behem, 1585) – Available on Google Books
- Rosarii hyperapistes, hoc est, Depulsio levissimarum cavillationum et nugarum, quibus calvinianae theologiae studiosus nescio quis apodixin theologicam ritu precandi rosarium B. Virg. Mariae (Würzburg, Henricus Aquensis, 1588) – Available on Google Books
- Enchiridion piarum meditationum (Mainz, Balthasar Lipp, 1606) – Available on Google Books
  - Manuel contenant des dévotes méditations (Douai, Jan Bogard, 1612)
  - Den schadt der meditatien, translated by Cornelius Thielmans (Antwerp, Willem Lesteens, 1628)
- Παναριον, hoc est, Arca medica (Mainz, Johannes Albinus, 1608) – Available on Google Books
- Viridarium christianarum virtutum (Mainz, Johannes Albinus, 1610) – Available on Google Books
- De Statibus hominum (Mainz, 1613). Published posthumously. 1614 Lyon edition available on Google Books.

As editor

- Anastasius Bibliothecarius (attrib.), Historia de vitis Romanorum Pontificum (Mainz, Johannes Albinus, 1602). The first printed edition of the Liber Pontificalis. Available on Google Books
- Johannes Trithemius, Opera pia et spiritualia (Mainz, Johannes Albinus, 1604) – Available on Google Books
- Paralipomena opusculorum (Mainz, Balthasar Lipp, 1605). A compilation containing various works by Peter of Blois and Johannes Trithemius. Available on Google Books
