= Gerardo Cagnoli =

Italian Roman Catholic and professed religious from the Order of Friars Minor

Blessed Gerardo Cagnoli O.F.M.
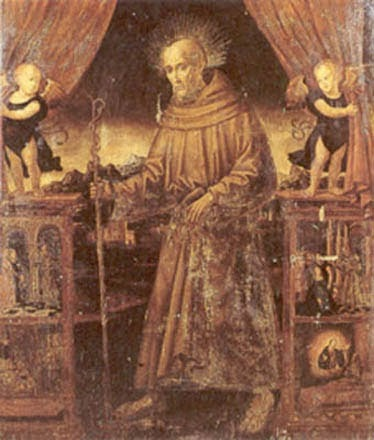

Religious
- Born: c. 1267; Valenza, Alessandria, Italian Kingdom
- Died: 29 December 1342 (aged 75); Palermo, Kingdom of Sicily
- Venerated in: Roman Catholic Church
- Beatified: 13 May 1908, Apostolic Palace, Rome, Kingdom of Italy by Pope Pius X
- Feast: 29 December; 3 January (Alessandria)
- Attributes: Franciscan habit

Gerardo Cagnoli (c. 1267 – 29 December 1342) was an Italian Roman Catholic and professed religious from the Order of Friars Minor. He embarked on a long pilgrimage south where he passed through Rome and Naples before settling in Trapani and then on the slopes of Mount Etna for a long hermitage. He later entered the Franciscans and served in two of their Sicilian convents where he was known for having caused miracles in addition to his humble and simple childlike nature which people believed was one of the signs of his holiness.

The Sicilian people revered Cagnoli as a saint after his death and the fame of his holiness spread throughout Italian regions as far north as Liguria. Pope Pius X confirmed his longstanding "cultus" in 1908.

== Life ==
Gerardo Cagnoli was born circa 1267 (Note: Other sources suggest that Cagnoli was born in 1268.) in Valenza in the Alessandria province. His parents were wealthy nobles. His father died when Gerardo was ten years old. He cared for his widowed mother. who was suffered from tuberculosis and was at her bedside until she died in 1290 at the age of 40. (Note: Other sources suggest she died in 1280.) His mother's death saw Cagnoli on his own and so he decided to give all his possessions to the poor and begin life as a hermit.

Cagnoli decided to become a hermit and tried finding the ideal place to begin his hermitage. He travelled south to Rome and then Naples but believed the great mass of people was too much. He continued further south (leaving Naples on a ship to Messina) where he settled in Erice in Trapani near Mount San Giuliano but later relocated around 1294 to the slopes at Mount Etna. In 1307 he ended his solitude to join the Order of Friars Minor at their Radazzo convent in Catania as a professed brother. Cagnoli would spend the rest of his life as porter at the convent of San Francesco in Palermo. He also served as a cook at the convent and was known for bringing about miracles and for his childlike and simple nature.

He was an ardent devotee to Louis of Toulouse (whom Pope John XXII canonized in 1317) who was also a Franciscan and his example was the reason that Cagnoli decided to enter the order in the first place.

The friar died on 29 December 1342 in Palermo at the San Francesco convent after he took ill not long before during that month. (Note: Other sources suggest that Cagnoli died in 1343 and 1345 and biographers do not agree on when it was. The conclusion is that he died in the 1340s.) His remains are housed in Palermo in the Chiesa di San Francesco.

== Veneration ==
Cagnoli's reputation for holiness was evident in Palermo throughout his lifetime with people learning of the miracles he was said to have performed. His fame for personal holiness and for the miracles he did spread to Corsica and as far north as Liguria. In 1344 Taddeo Gaddi was commissioned to paint a fresco depicting some scenes from the life of Gerard for the church of San Francesco de' Ferri in Pisa. In 1346 a relic of Gerard was translated to San Francesco de' Ferri.

The process for his beatification opened in Palermo in 1622 but was interrupted in 1630 before it resumed there again in a process that spanned from 18 June 1888 until 31 May 1889. He was beatified on 13 May 1908 after Pope Pius X confirmed that there existed a longstanding "cultus" (or popular devotion and veneration) to the late friar that was sufficient ground for his beatification based on his enduring reputation for holiness.
