= Fregosi =

Fregosi is a surname. Notable people with the surname include:

- Carlo Fregosi (1890–1968), Italian gymnast
- Jim Fregosi (1942–2014), American baseball player and manager
