= Bartholomew Albizzi =

Italian Franciscan hagiographer

Bartholomew Albizzi (died 1361) was an Italian Franciscan hagiographer. He is known for his life of Gerardo Cagnoli.
