= Francisco Arias =

Spanish Catholic author (1533–1605)

Francisco Arias (1533 – 15 May 1605) was a Spanish Catholic author, known as a writer of ascetical treatises.

Arias was born in Seville and joined the Society of Jesus at the age of twenty-six. He studied at the University of Alcalá, and was later professor of scholastic theology at Córdoba, and professor of moral theology at the College of Santa Catalina, Trigueros. He also served as rector of the colleges at Trigueros and Cádiz.

Arias was commonly regarded as a saint, and was known for his gift of prayer and his spirit of penance. He was especially devoted to the care of blacks, Moors, and the inmates of hospitals and prisons. Arias was held in high esteem by John of Avila, and his works are recommended by St. Francis of Sales in his Introduction to a Devout Life.

== Works ==
- Spiritual Profit
- Treatise on the Rosary
- Imitation of Our Lady
- Imitation of Christ
- Mental Prayer
- The Use of the Sacraments
- The Promises of God
- The Turpitude and Grievousness of Sin
