= Robert Bellarmine =

Italian Jesuit cardinal and saint (1542–1621)

Saint Robert Bellarmine SJ
- Confessor and Doctor of the Church
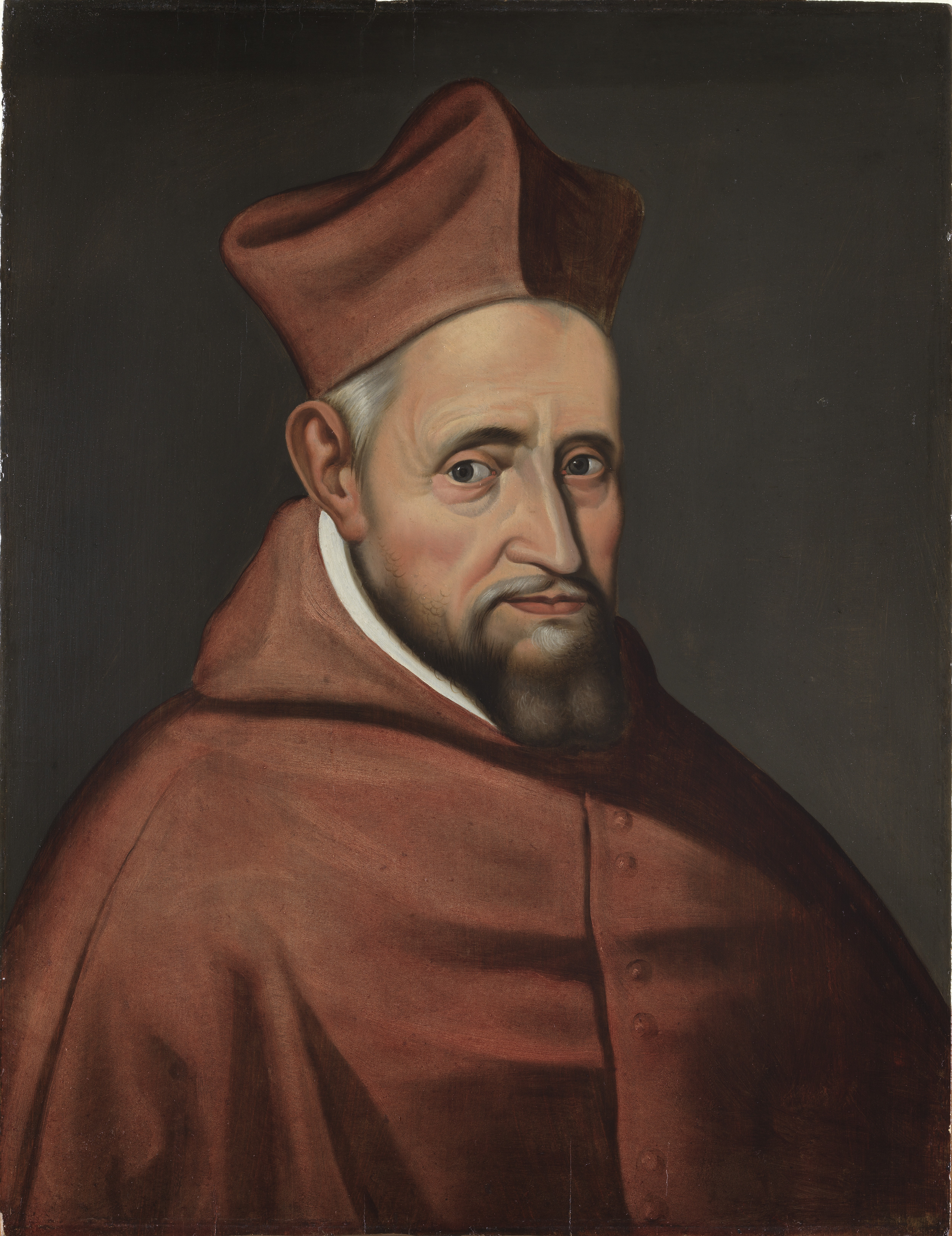
- 17th-century portrait of Robert Bellarmine, Antwerp, Museum Plantin-Moretus
- Church: Catholic Church
- See: Capua
- Appointed: 18 March 1602
- Installed: 21 April 1602
- Term ended: August 1605
- Predecessor: Cesare Costa
- Successor: Antonio Caetani Jr.
- Other post: Cardinal-Priest of Santa Prassede
- Previous post: Archbishop of Capua (1602–1605)

Orders
- Ordination: 19 March 1570
- Consecration: 21 April 1602 by Clement VIII
- Created cardinal: 3 March 1599 by Clement VIII
- Rank: Cardinal-Priest

Personal details
- Born: 4 October 1542 Montepulciano, Duchy of Florence
- Died: 17 September 1621 (aged 78) Rome, Papal States
- Coat of arms: Robert Bellarmine's coat of arms

Sainthood
- Feast day: 17 September; 13 May (General Roman Calendar, 1932–1969)
- Venerated in: Catholic Church
- Beatified: 13 May 1923; Rome, Kingdom of Italy by Pius XI
- Canonized: 29 June 1930; Rome, Vatican City by Pius XI
- Patronage: Bellarmine University, Bellarmine Preparatory School, Fairfield University, Bellarmine College Preparatory, St. Robert's School, Darjeeling, canonists, canon lawyers, catechists, catechumens, Archdiocese of Cincinnati, St. Robert Catholic High School, Scranton Preparatory School
- Shrines: Chiesa di Sant'Ignazio, Rome, Italy

Robert Bellarmine (/ˈbɛlɑːrmiːn/; Italian: Roberto Francesco Romolo Bellarmino; 4 October 1542 – 17 September 1621) was an Italian Jesuit and a cardinal of the Catholic Church. He was canonized a saint in 1930 and named Doctor of the Church, one of only 27 at the time. He was one of the most important figures in the Counter-Reformation.

Bellarmine was a professor of theology and later rector of the Roman College, and in 1602 became Archbishop of Capua. He supported the reform decrees of the Council of Trent. He is also widely remembered for his role in the Giordano Bruno affair, the Galileo affair, and the trial of Friar Fulgenzio Manfredi.

== Early life ==
Robert Bellarmine was born in Montepulciano, the son of noble, albeit impoverished, parents, Vincenzo Bellarmino and his wife Cinzia Cervini, who was the sister of Pope Marcellus II. As a boy he knew Virgil by heart and composed a number of poems in Italian and Latin. One of his hymns, on Mary Magdalene, is included in the Roman Breviary.

Bellarmine entered the Roman Jesuit novitiate in 1560, remaining in Rome for three years. He was then sent to a Jesuit house at Mondovì, in Piedmont, where he learned Greek. While at Mondovì, he came to the attention of Francesco Adorno, the local Jesuit provincial superior, who sent him to the University of Padua.

== Career ==
Bellarmine's systematic studies of theology began at Padua in 1567 and 1568, where his teachers were adherents of Thomism. In 1569, he was sent to finish his studies at the University of Leuven in Brabant. There he was ordained and obtained a reputation both as a professor and as a preacher. He was the first Jesuit to teach at the university, where the subject of his course was the Summa Theologica of Thomas Aquinas. He was involved in a controversy with Michael Baius on the subject of Grace and free will, and wrote a Hebrew grammar. His residency in Leuven lasted seven years. In poor health, in 1576 he made a journey to Italy. Here he remained, commissioned by Pope Gregory XIII to lecture on polemical theology in the new Roman College, now known as the Pontifical Gregorian University. Later, he would promote the cause of the beatification of Aloysius Gonzaga, who had been a student at the college during Bellarmine's tenure. His lectures were published under the title De Controversias in four large volumes.

=== New duties after 1589 ===
Until 1589, Bellarmine was occupied as professor of theology. After the murder in that year of Henry III of France, Pope Sixtus V sent Enrico Caetani as legate to Paris to negotiate with the Catholic League of France, and chose Bellarmine to accompany him as theologian. He was in the city during its siege by Henry of Navarre.

Upon the death of Pope Sixtus V in 1590, the Count of Olivares wrote to Philip II of Spain, "Bellarmine ... would not do for a Pope, for he is mindful only of the interests of the Church and is unresponsive to the reasons of princes."

Pope Clement VIII, said of him, "the Church of God had not his equal in learning". Bellarmine was made rector of the Roman College in 1592, examiner of bishops in 1598, and cardinal in 1599. Immediately after his appointment as Cardinal, Pope Clement made him a Cardinal Inquisitor, in which capacity he served as one of the judges at the trial of Giordano Bruno, and concurred in the decision which condemned Bruno to be burned at the stake as a heretic.

In 1602, he was made archbishop of Capua. He had written against bishops failing to reside in their dioceses. As bishop, he put into effect the reforming decrees of the Council of Trent. He received some votes in the 1605 conclaves which elected Pope Leo XI, Pope Paul V, and in 1621 when Pope Gregory XV was elected, but his being a Jesuit counted against him in the judgement of many of the cardinals.

Thomas Hobbes saw Bellarmine in Rome at a service on All Saints Day (1 November) 1614 and, exempting him alone from a general castigation of cardinals, described him as "a little lean old man" who lived "more retired".

=== The Galileo case ===
In 1616, on the orders of Paul V, Bellarmine summoned Galileo, notified him of a forthcoming decree of the Congregation of the Index condemning the Copernican doctrine of the mobility of the Earth and the immobility of the Sun, and ordered him to abandon it. Galileo agreed to do so.

When Galileo later complained of rumours to the effect that he had been forced to abjure and do penance, Bellarmine wrote out a certificate denying the rumours, stating that Galileo had merely been notified of the decree and informed that, as a consequence of it, the Copernican doctrine could not be "defended or held". Unlike the previously mentioned formal injunction (see earlier footnote), this certificate would have allowed Galileo to continue using and teaching the mathematical content of Copernicus's theory as a purely theoretical device for predicting the apparent motions of the planets.

According to some of his letters, Cardinal Bellarmine believed that a demonstration for heliocentrism could not be found because it would contradict the unanimous consent of the Fathers' scriptural exegesis, to which the Council of Trent, in 1546, defined all Catholics must adhere. In other passages, Bellarmine argued that he did not support the heliocentric model for the lack of evidence of the time ("I will not believe that there is such a demonstration, until it is shown to me").

Bellarmine wrote to heliocentrist Paolo Antonio Foscarini in 1615:

The Council [of Trent] prohibits interpreting Scripture against the common consensus of the Holy Fathers; and if Your Paternity wants to read not only the Holy Fathers, but also the modern commentaries on Genesis, the Psalms, Ecclesiastes, and Joshua, you will find all agreeing in the literal interpretation that the sun is in heaven and turns around the earth with great speed, and that the earth is very far from heaven and sits motionless at the center of the world.

and

I say that if there were a true demonstration that the sun is at the center of the world and the earth in the third heaven, and that the sun does not circle the earth but the earth circles the sun, then one would have to proceed with great care in explaining the Scriptures that appear contrary, and say rather that we do not understand them, than that what is demonstrated is false. But I will not believe that there is such a demonstration, until it is shown me. Nor is it the same to demonstrate that by supposing the sun to be at the center and the earth in heaven one can save the appearances, and to demonstrate that in truth the sun is at the center and the earth in heaven; for I believe the first demonstration may be available, but I have very great doubts about the second, and in case of doubt one must not abandon the Holy Scripture as interpreted by the Holy Fathers.

In 1633, nearly twelve years after Bellarmine's death, Galileo was again called before the Inquisition in this matter. Galileo produced Bellarmine's certificate for his defense at the trial.

According to Pierre Duhem and Karl Popper "in one respect, at least, Bellarmine had shown himself a better scientist than Galileo by disallowing the possibility of a "strict proof" of the earth's motion, on the grounds that an astronomical theory merely "saves the appearances" without necessarily revealing what "really happens". Philosopher of science Thomas Kuhn, in his book, The Copernican Revolution, after commenting on Cesare Cremonini, who refused to look through Galileo's telescope, wrote:

Most of Galileo's opponents behaved more rationally. Like Bellarmine, they agreed that the phenomena were in the sky but denied that they proved Galileo's contentions. In this, of course, they were quite right. Though the telescope argued much, it proved nothing.

== Death ==
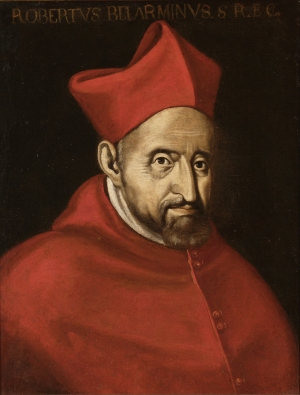
16th-century portrait of Saint Robert Bellarmine

Robert Bellarmine retired to Sant'Andrea degli Scozzesi, the Jesuit college of Saint Andrew in Rome. He died on 17 September 1621, aged 78. He was buried in the Church of St. Ignatius in Rome.

== Works ==
Bellarmine's books bear the stamp of their period; the effort for literary elegance (so-called "maraviglia") had given place to a desire to pile up as much material as possible, to embrace the whole field of human knowledge, and incorporate it into theology. His controversial works provoked many replies, and were studied for some decades after his death. (Note: On Laymen or Secular People; On the Temporal Power of the Pope. Against William Barclay; and On the Primary Duty of the Supreme Pontiff, are included in Bellarmine, On Temporal and Spiritual Authority, Stefania Tutino (ed.) trans., Indianapolis, IN: Liberty Fund, 2012) At Leuven he made extensive studies in the Church Fathers and scholastic theologians, which gave him the material for his book De scriptoribus ecclesiasticis (Rome, 1613). It was later revised and enlarged by Sirmond, Labbeus, and Casimir Oudin. Bellarmine wrote the preface to the new Sixto-Clementine Vulgate. Bellarmine also prepared for posterity his own commentary on each of the Psalms. An English translation from the Latin was published in 1866.

=== Dogmatics ===
From his research grew Disputationes de controversiis christianae fidei (also called Controversiae), first published at Ingolstadt in 1581–1593. This major work was the earliest attempt to systematize the various religious disputes between Catholics and Protestants. Bellarmine reviewed the issues and devoted eleven years to it while at the Roman College. In August 1590, Pope Sixtus V decided to place the first volume of the Disputationes on the Index because Bellarmine argued in it that the Pope is not the temporal ruler of the whole world and that temporal rulers do not derive their authority to rule from God but from the consent of the governed. However, Sixtus died before the revised Index was published, and the next Pope, Urban VII, removed the book from the Index during his brief twelve-day reign.

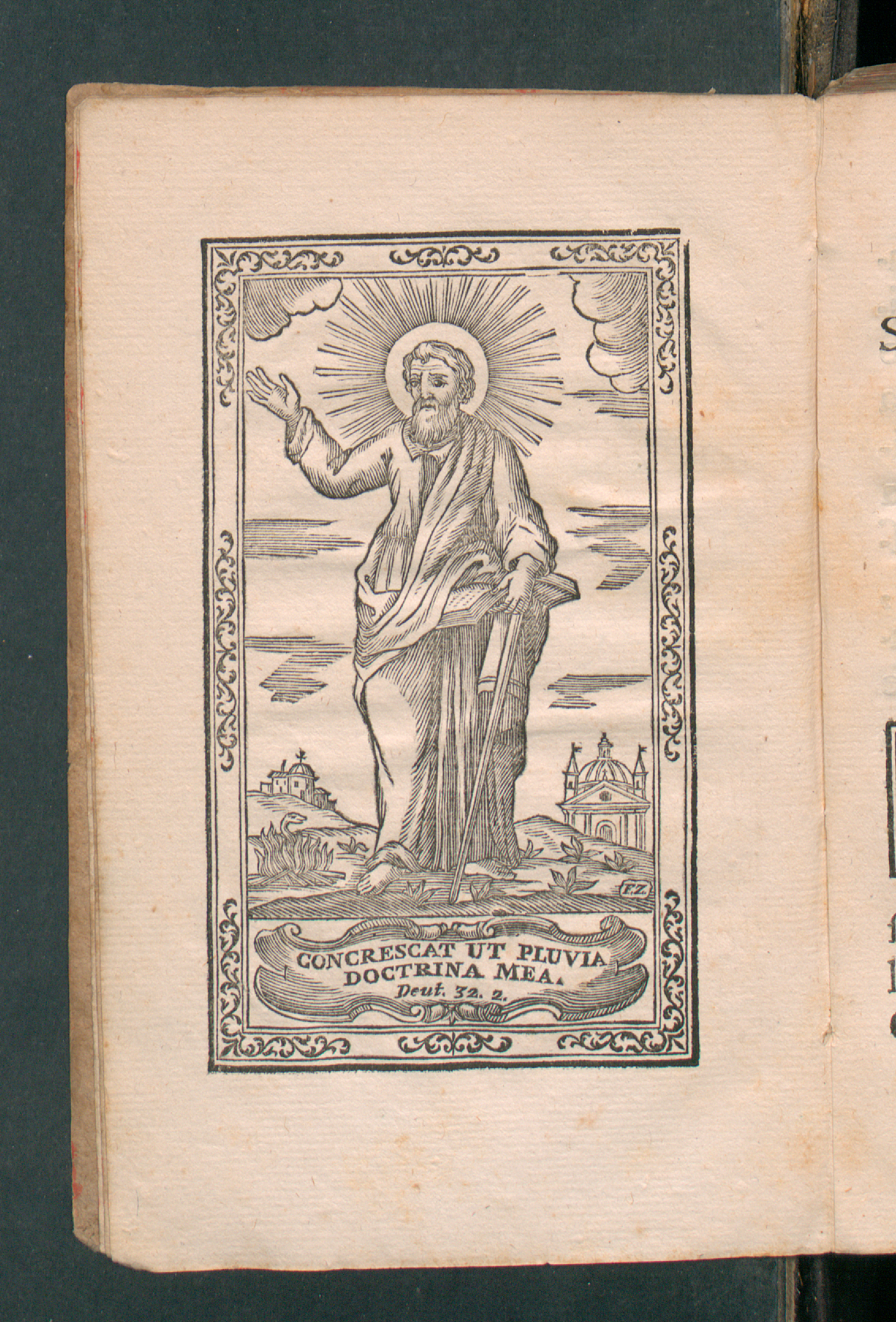
Page of the short catechism of Bellarmine: Dottrina cristiana breve, 1752

In 1597–98, he published a catechism in two versions (short and full) which was approved by Pope Clement VIII and used as a standard catechetical text for centuries.

=== Venetian Interdict ===
Under Pope Paul V (reigned 1605–1621), a major conflict arose between Venice and the Papacy. Paolo Sarpi, as spokesman for the Republic of Venice, protested against the papal interdict, and reasserted the principles of the Council of Constance and of the Council of Basel, denying the pope's authority in secular matters. Bellarmine wrote three rejoinders to the Venetian theologians, and may have warned Sarpi of an impending murderous attack, when in September 1607, an unfrocked friar and brigand by the name of Rotilio Orlandini planned to kill Sarpi for the sum of 8,000 crowns. Orlandini's plot was discovered, and when he and his accomplices crossed from Papal into Venetian territory they were arrested.

=== Allegiance oath controversy and papal authority ===
Bellarmine also became involved in controversy with King James I of England. From a point of principle for English Catholics, this debate drew in figures from much of Western Europe. It raised the profile of both protagonists, King James as a champion of his own restricted Calvinist Protestantism, and Bellarmine for Tridentine Catholicism.

=== Devotional works ===
During his retirement, he wrote several short books intended to help ordinary people in their spiritual life: De ascensione mentis in Deum per scalas rerum creatorum opusculum (The Mind's Ascent to God by the Ladder of Created Things; 1614) which was translated into English as Jacob's Ladder (1638) without acknowledgement by Henry Isaacson, The Art of Dying Well (1619) (in Latin, English translation under this title by Edward Coffin), and The Seven Words on the Cross.

== Canonization and final resting place ==
Robert Bellarmine was canonized by Pope Pius XI in 1930; the following year he was declared a Doctor of the Church. His remains, in a cardinal's red robes, are displayed behind glass under a side altar in the Church of Saint Ignatius, the chapel of the Roman College, next to the body of his student Aloysius Gonzaga, as he himself had wished. In the General Roman Calendar Saint Robert Bellarmine's feast day is on 17 September, the day of his death; but some continue to use pre-1969 calendars, in which for 37 years his feast day was on 13 May. The rank assigned to his feast has been "double" (1932–1959), "third-class feast" (1960–1968), and since the 1969 revision "memorial".
