= Luca Pinelli (theologian) =

Italian theologian

Luca Pinelli (1542 Melfi; 1607 Naples) was an Italian Jesuit and theologian.

== Life ==
Born at Melfi, Basilicata, to a family from the Republic of Genoa, in 1562 he entered the Society of Jesus, where he taught theology and philosophy. Subsequently, he was sent to Germany and France to combat Protestantism, teaching theology at the universities of Ingolstadt (1575-1577) and Pont-a-Mousson (1577-1580). Under his influence, the two universities adopted Summa Theologica by Thomas Aquinas as a textbook.

Returned in Italy, Pinelli became rector at the colleges of Florence, Perugia and Palermo, where he composed most of his ascetical writings. Then he moved to Naples, where he died in 1607.

== Works ==
- De Statu Animarum In Altero Seculo (1577)
- Theologica Disputatio De Christo Opt. Max. Ac Matre Eivs Sanctissima (1577)
- De ecclesia theologica disputatio (1580)
- Libretto d'imagini e di brevi meditationi sopra i quattro nouissimi dell'huomo (1594)
- Libretto di brevi meditazioni del Santiss. Sacramento (1598)
- Meditationi Utilissime, Sopra I Quindeci Misterii Del Rosario, Della Sacratissima Vergine Maria (1602)
- Piae meditationes de Sanctissimo Eucharistiae sacramento (1603)
- Trattato delle sante indulgenze. Et del modo di quadagnarle così per i vivi, come peri morti (1607)
- Quaranta Essercitii Spirituali, Per L'Oratione delle Quaranta Hore (1609)
- Trattato del valore, et meravigliosi frutti della S. Messa (1609)
