= Heldswil =

Village in Thurgau, Switzerland

- Former municipality
- Location of Heldswil
- Location within Switzerland Location within Canton of Thurgau
- Coordinates: 47.5303°N 9.2203°E
- Country: Switzerland
- Canton: Thurgau
- District: Bischofszell
- Municipality: Hohentannen

Population (1990)
  - Total: 235
- Time zone: UTC+01:00 (CET)
  - Summer (DST): UTC+02:00 (CEST)
- SFOS number: 4491
- ISO 3166 code: CH-TG
- Website

Heldswil is a former Ortsgemeinde (local commune) in the canton of Thurgau, Switzerland, which has been part of the municipality of Hohentannen since 1999. The village lies away from the main roads on a hill between the valleys of the Thur and the Aach. With the hamlets of Hüttenswil and Bernhausen, it was an Ortsgemeinde of the Munizipalgemeinde (municipal commune) of Hohentannen from 1816 to 1998.

== History ==
Heldswil is first mentioned in 759 as Heidolviswilare. Before 1798, Heldswil, together with the larger part of Buchackern and part of Götighofen, formed the low court of Heldswil in the lordship of Bürglen, while the low court of Hüttenswil belonged partly to the abbot of St. Gall (the Berggericht) and partly to the lordship of Bürglen. In church matters Heldswil shared the fate of the parish of Sulgen. The chapel of St. Catherine, consecrated in Heldswil in 1489, belonged to the collegiate chapter of Bischofszell, the holder of its advowson (Kollator). In 1566 the chapter took the benefice back.

Until the 19th century viticulture, arable farming and peat extraction predominated, followed by livestock and dairy farming and fruit growing. Around 1900 embroidery provided additional income. The Riet, a marsh, was drained from 1940 to 1947. Although some small businesses have settled there in recent times, Heldswil has remained a farming village.

The population was 290 in 1850, 250 in 1900, 264 in 1950, 220 in 1980 and 235 in 1990.

== Bibliography ==
- E. Menolfi, Bürglen, 1996, pp. 30–31, 52
- Albert Knoepfli, Der Bezirk Bischofszell, 1962, pp. 418–421 (Die Kunstdenkmäler des Kantons Thurgau, 3)
