= Buchackern =

Village in Thurgau, Switzerland

- Former municipality
- Location of Buchackern
- Location within Switzerland Location within Canton of Thurgau
- Coordinates: 47.5399°N 9.2339°E
- Country: Switzerland
- Canton: Thurgau
- District: Bischofszell
- Municipality: Erlen

Population (1990)
  - Total: 146
- Time zone: UTC+01:00 (CET)
  - Summer (DST): UTC+02:00 (CEST)
- ISO 3166 code: CH-TG
- Website

Buchackern is a former Ortsgemeinde (local commune) in the canton of Thurgau, Switzerland, now part of the municipality of Erlen. From 1803 to 1994 it belonged to the former Munizipalgemeinde (municipal commune) of Erlen. The farming village lies away from the main roads, on the ridge south of the Aach valley.

== History ==
Buchackern is first mentioned in 1303 as Buchaker. From the Middle Ages until 1798 most of Buchackern belonged to the low court of Heldswil, which, as part of the lordship of Bürglen, was subject to the city of St. Gallen from 1579. A Freivogtei (free bailiwick) of Buchackern, which also belonged to Bürglen, is recorded around 1440; individual houses belonged to the lordship of Oberaach of the Bishop of Constance. Buchackern originally belonged to the parish of Sulgen. Since the Reformed church of Erlen was built in 1764, the mainly Reformed inhabitants of Buchackern have attended services in Erlen, which gradually freed itself from its status as a daughter church of Sulgen in the 18th and 19th centuries and became fully independent in 1992.

In the 19th century cereals, fruit and grapes were grown, and there was a calico weaving mill. An embroidery business and a cheese dairy were added around 1900. In the 20th century dairy farming, livestock breeding and intensive fruit growing still dominated; in 1990 the primary sector provided 66% of the jobs in Buchackern, and 61% of the working population commuted elsewhere.

Buchackern had 143 inhabitants in 1850, 165 in 1880, 146 in 1900, 154 in 1950 and 146 in 1990.

== Bibliography ==
- H. Hasenfratz, Die Landgrafschaft Thurgau vor der Revolution von 1798, 1908, pp. 64, 74
- E. Menolfi, Sanktgallische Untertanen im Thurgau, 1980, pp. 10–11, 23–24
- Kirchgemeinden und Pfarrbücher im Thurgau: Bruno Meyer zum achtzigsten Geburtstag, 1991, pp. 104, 134
