= Ganymed (Zurich) =

Sculpture by Hermann Hubacher

Coordinates: 47.36600°N 8.54122°E

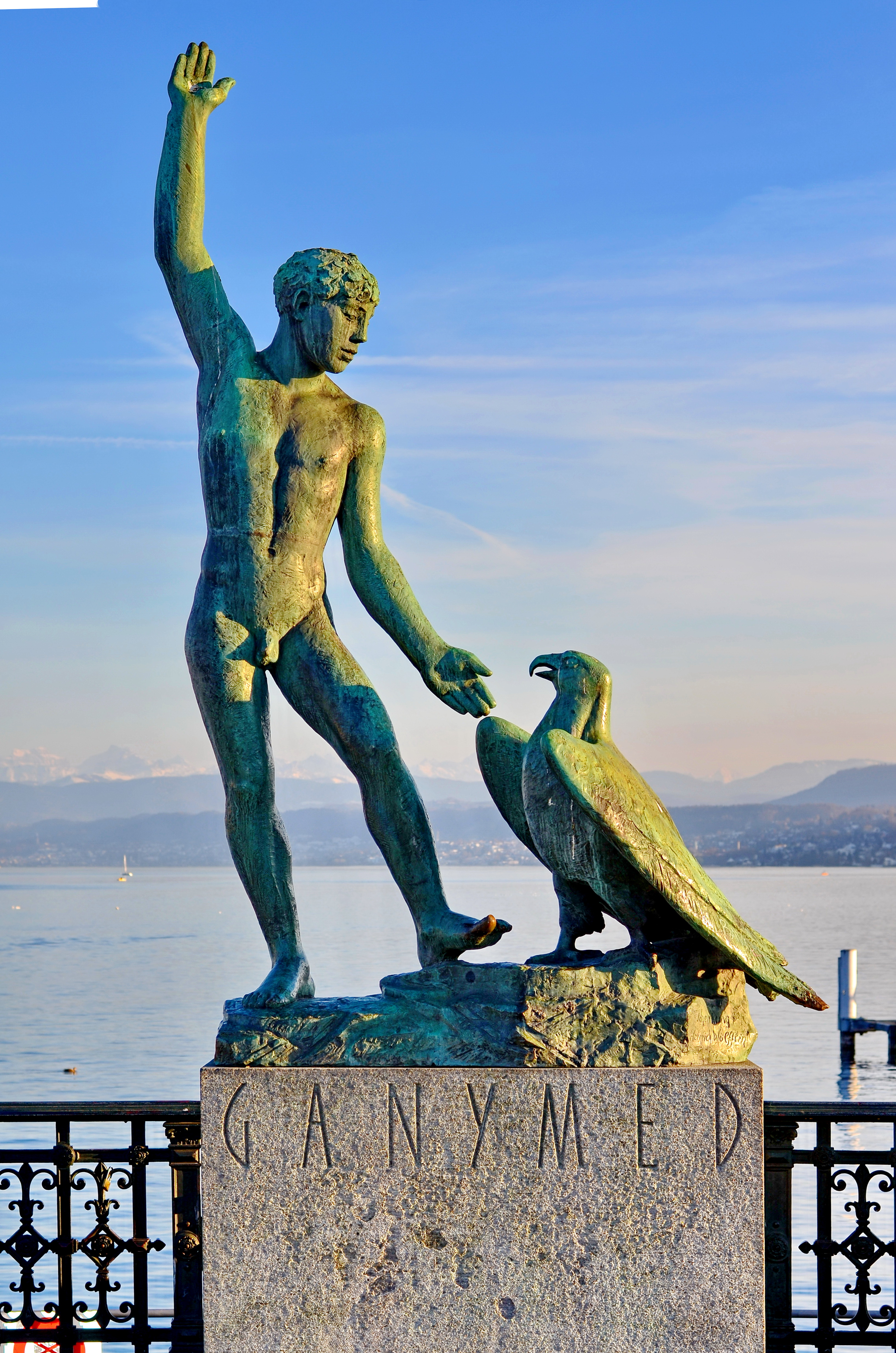
Ganymede sculpture

Ganymede is the name of a sculpture on the Bürkliterrasse, Zurich's Front Row Seat by the Lake, located on Bürkliplatz, a popular square on Lake Zurich. It is the central eye-catcher of the square, which was completed in 1887, with the Alpine panorama towering on the horizon. The sculpture was designed by the artist Hermann Hubacher as the "Abduction to Olympus", unveiled by the City of Zurich in 1952 and owned by its Art Collection.

The work shows the shepherd boy Ganymede who is facing the seated eagle (God the Father Zeus). He will be abducted by him to heaven and will serve there as cupbearer and bedmate.

== History ==
The initiative and the commission for the design of the figure came from the art historian Heinrich Wölfflin who wrote to Hubacher at the end of January 1942 that he would like to donate a figure to the city of Zurich and that it would have to be a male figure, since Zurich already had many female ones. Furthermore, it would have to be of strict form, so that the regularity and beauty of the building comes through. It was also important to him that the architectural framework was very definite.

1942 was also the year in which impunity for homosexuality was introduced in Switzerland. Wölfflin had recognised that the male ideal of beauty was clearly underrepresented compared to female representations in the townscape. This has not changed until the beginning of the 21st century.

Wölfflin donated the work to the city of Zurich, which inaugurated it in a ceremony on 20 June 1952.

== Description ==
Ganymede and the eagle face each other as a larger-than-life bronze sculpture. Ganymede stretches his right arm vertically towards the sky away from the bird, while the latter tries to communicate with the youth. In contrast to the traditional saga in which Ganymede was abducted, pictorial representations of earlier works vary, from Rembrandt's struggling infant to the fully bloomed young man in Briton Rivière's (1840-1920) work, who has Ganymede lifted up by the eagle, absorbed in a dream and wrapped in ribbons of cloth. Hubacher interprets the imminent translocation quite differently, namely illustrating through the hand stretched towards the sky that it is Ganymede himself asking Zeus to take him up. Karl Meier writes in the Swiss gay magazine Der Kreis that he is completely taken in by its beauty and praises the figure to the utmost. Above all, he loves the lifelike and natural appearance.

The beginning of Goethe's quotation from his hymn Ganymed is carved on the plinth, which reads: "How, in the light of morning, Round me thou glowest, Spring, thou beloved one!" German: "Wie im Morgenglanze — Du rings mich anglühst, — Frühling, Geliebter!!" The bronze is both signed by Hubacher and intended for the donor Wölfflin.

== Interpretation ==
Ganymede from the mythological world of legend is considered a male ideal of beauty. According to the german-language based daily newspaper Neue Zürcher Zeitung (NZZ), this is an early monument to same-sex love. In the homosexual movement of the time, the Swiss gay magazine Der Kreis celebrated the new sculpture with the words "the work of art most beautifully refutes the assertion of the inferiority of our inclination and becomes a striking means of struggle against prejudice and lack of understanding.
