= Bleiken, Thurgau =

Village in Thurgau, Switzerland

Bleiken
- Former municipality
- Aerial view from the northwest by Walter Mittelholzer (1929)
- Location of Bleiken
- Location within Switzerland Location within Canton of Thurgau
- Coordinates: 47.5340004°N 9.19559956°E
- Country: Switzerland
- Canton: Thurgau
- District: Bischofszell
- Municipality: Sulgen

Population (1960)
  - Total: 342
- Time zone: UTC+01:00 (CET)
  - Summer (DST): UTC+02:00 (CEST)
- SFOS number: 4506
- ISO 3166 code: CH-TG
- Website

Bleiken is a former Ortsgemeinde (local commune) in the canton of Thurgau, Switzerland, now part of the political municipality of Sulgen. From 1812 to 1963 the small farming village, which lies away from the main traffic routes, formed an Ortsgemeinde of the former Munizipalgemeinde (municipal commune) of Sulgen, together with the single farm of Befang on the main road from Sulgen to Gossau. In 1964 the former Ortsgemeinden of Bleiken and Sulgen were united.

== History ==
Bleiken is possibly first mentioned in 869, as Pleichun. From the 13th century its most important feudal lords were the Abbey of Saint Gall, the chapter of canons of St. Pelagius in Bischofszell, the Hohes Haus of the confraternity of the cathedral chaplains in Constance and the church (Gotteshaus) of Wil. In 1293 Bleiken belonged to the lordship of Bürglen.

Later Bleiken, together with the Helmsdorf part (Helmsdorf'scher Teil) of Buhwil and smaller settlements, formed the low court of Bleiken. In 1608 the court passed from Hans Heinrich von Helmsdorf to the squire (Junker) Lorenz Kunkler of St. Gallen, and in 1647 to the city of St. Gallen, and with it back to the lordship of Bürglen, to which it belonged until 1798. The single farm of Befang belonged to the low court of Oetlishausen.

Bleiken always belonged to the parish of Sulgen. From the Reformation until 1799 only the Reformed confession was present. The farming economy was marked by grain growing in three fields (Zelgen) and viticulture, by isolated enclosures (Einschläge) in the 18th century, and in the 19th century by the shift to livestock and dairy farming and fruit growing. After the Sulgen–Gossau railway opened in 1876, Befang grew strongly until 1910, with embroidery businesses.

The former Ortsgemeinde of Bleiken had 41 inhabitants in 1634, 22 in 1640, 95 in 1670, 62 in 1799, 71 in 1870, 112 in 1900, 204 in 1910 and 342 in 1960.

== Bibliography ==
- E. Menolfi, Geschichte von Sulgen, 1984
