= Zihlschlacht =

Village in Thurgau, Switzerland

- Former municipality
- Zihlschlacht from the air in 1954
- Location of Zihlschlacht
- Location within Switzerland Location within Canton of Thurgau
- Coordinates: 47.5233°N 9.2604°E
- Country: Switzerland
- Canton: Thurgau
- District: Weinfelden
- Municipality: Zihlschlacht-Sitterdorf

Population (1990)
  - Total: 745
- Time zone: UTC+01:00 (CET)
  - Summer (DST): UTC+02:00 (CEST)
- ISO 3166 code: CH-TG
- Website

Zihlschlacht is a former Ortsgemeinde (local commune) and former Munizipalgemeinde (municipal commune) in the canton of Thurgau, Switzerland. In 1997 it merged with Sitterdorf to form the municipality of Zihlschlacht-Sitterdorf, in the district of Weinfelden. Zihlschlacht lies between the valleys of the Aach and the Sitter.

== History ==
Zihlschlacht is first mentioned in 817 as Zilleslata. In 817 the Abbey of Saint Gall received two hides (Huben) there from Emperor Louis the Pious. In the late Middle Ages both the Bishop of Constance and the Abbey of Saint Gall held lands and rights in Zihlschlacht. The lordship belonged to the Ryff family from the 14th to the 16th century, to the von Hallwyl family from 1561 and to the city of Zurich from 1769 to 1798.

In 1803 the Ortsgemeinden of Schocherswil, Sitterdorf and Zihlschlacht formed the Munizipalgemeinde of Zihlschlacht. From 1803 to 2010 Zihlschlacht was part of Bischofszell District. In 1997 the Ortsgemeinden of Sitterdorf and Zihlschlacht united with the Munizipalgemeinde of Zihlschlacht to form the political municipality (politische Gemeinde) of Zihlschlacht-Sitterdorf. The former Munizipalgemeinde had 1,380 inhabitants in 1850, 1,468 in 1900, 1,722 in 1950, 1,567 in 1970 and 2,017 in 1990. The former Ortsgemeinde had 485 inhabitants in 1850, 506 in 1900, 618 in 1950, 551 in 1970 and 745 in 1990.

From 1529 the Reformed pastor of Sitterdorf preached in Zihlschlacht, which became a branch (Filiale) of that parish in 1712. The chapel of St. Afra, mentioned in 1352, was enlarged into a church. The school, which dates from 1650, was a one-room school (Gesamtschule) until 1879.

Besides the growing of grain, fruit and flax, meadow farming, and dairy and livestock farming (with a cheese dairy around 1900), the inhabitants practiced linen and cotton weaving and cut peat. In the 19th century there was a paper mill, and from 1880 to 1931 a mechanical and Schiffli embroidery works. The Friedheim sanatorium for nervous disorders (Nervenheilanstalt), founded in 1891, was converted into a rehabilitation clinic.

== Bibliography ==
- Die Kunstdenkmäler des Kantons Thurgau, 3, 1962, 547–554
- Hinweisinventar Thurgau: Zihlschlacht-Sitterdorf, I, manuscript, 2004 (State Archives of Thurgau)
- B. Holzer, Schule Zihlschlacht, 1836–2005, 2005
