= Fritz Wartenweiler =

Swiss educator (1889–1985)

- Born: 20 August 1889; Kradolf, Thurgau, Switzerland
- Died: 20 July 1985 (aged 95); Frauenfeld, Thurgau, Switzerland
- Occupations: Educator; writer
- Spouse: Anna Elisabeth Haffter (m. 1912)
- Parents: Eduard Wartenweiler (father); Hermine Kreis (mother)

Fritz Wartenweiler (20 August 1889 – 20 July 1985) was a Swiss educator from the canton of Thurgau who saw the promotion of adult education as his life's task. In 1919 he founded the adult education center Nussbaum near Frauenfeld, which he directed until 1926, and he worked as a traveling adult educator and lecturer. He wrote on adult education and on Danish folk high schools, as well as biographies, and in 1940 he was one of the co-founders of the Swiss Working Group for War-Affected Children.

== Biography ==
Fritz Wartenweiler was born on 20 August 1889 in Kradolf, the son of Eduard Wartenweiler, a chicory roaster (Zichorienröster), and Hermine née Kreis. In 1912 he married Anna Elisabeth Haffter.

From 1905 to 1909 Wartenweiler attended the cantonal school (Kantonsschule) in Frauenfeld, and from 1909 to 1911 he studied philology and philosophy in Berlin and Copenhagen. In 1913 he obtained his doctorate at the University of Zurich. During his studies he engaged with the Danish folk high school movement, and he taught at a folk high school.

From 1914 to 1917 Wartenweiler was head of the teacher training college (Lehrerseminar) in Solothurn. In 1919 he founded the adult education center (Volksbildungsheim) Nussbaum near Frauenfeld, which he directed until 1926. Wartenweiler, who saw the promotion of adult education (Volksbildung) as his life's task, also worked as a "traveling adult educator" (wandernder Volksbildner) and as a lecturer. In 1935 he was involved in founding the Herzberg adult education center in the municipality of Densbüren.

He published on questions of adult education, on the concepts of Danish folk high schools and on the relationship between school and family. He wrote biographies of well-known politicians and philosophers (Ben-Gurion, Mahatma Gandhi, Fridtjof Nansen, Albert Einstein). In 1940 he was one of the co-founders of the Swiss Working Group for War-Affected Children (Schweizerische Arbeitsgemeinschaft für kriegsgeschädigte Kinder). He died in Frauenfeld on 20 July 1985.

== Works ==
- Ein Neunziger sucht, 1979 (autobiography)

== Bibliography ==
- F. J. Graab, Fritz Wartenweiler und die Erwachsenenbildung in der Schweiz, 1975
- A. A. Häsler, Aussenseiter – Innenseiter, 1983, 63–68
- E. Baumann, Wir bangen um das Ganze, 1989
