= EZC =

EZC or Ezc may refer to:

== EZC ==
- EZC Polar Bears, a name for the Edese Zwem- & Poloclub Polar Bears
- EZC, abbreviation for Enkhuizer Zwemclub, sports club of Wijda Mazereeuw
- Excentric-Club – Zürich, club of Anna Vock
- EZC Pak, featured in Shark Tank season 11
- EZC '84, sports club of Sven van Doorm

== Ezc ==
- Ezc, mineral symbol for Ezcurrite
