= Hudelmoos =

Bog in eastern Switzerland

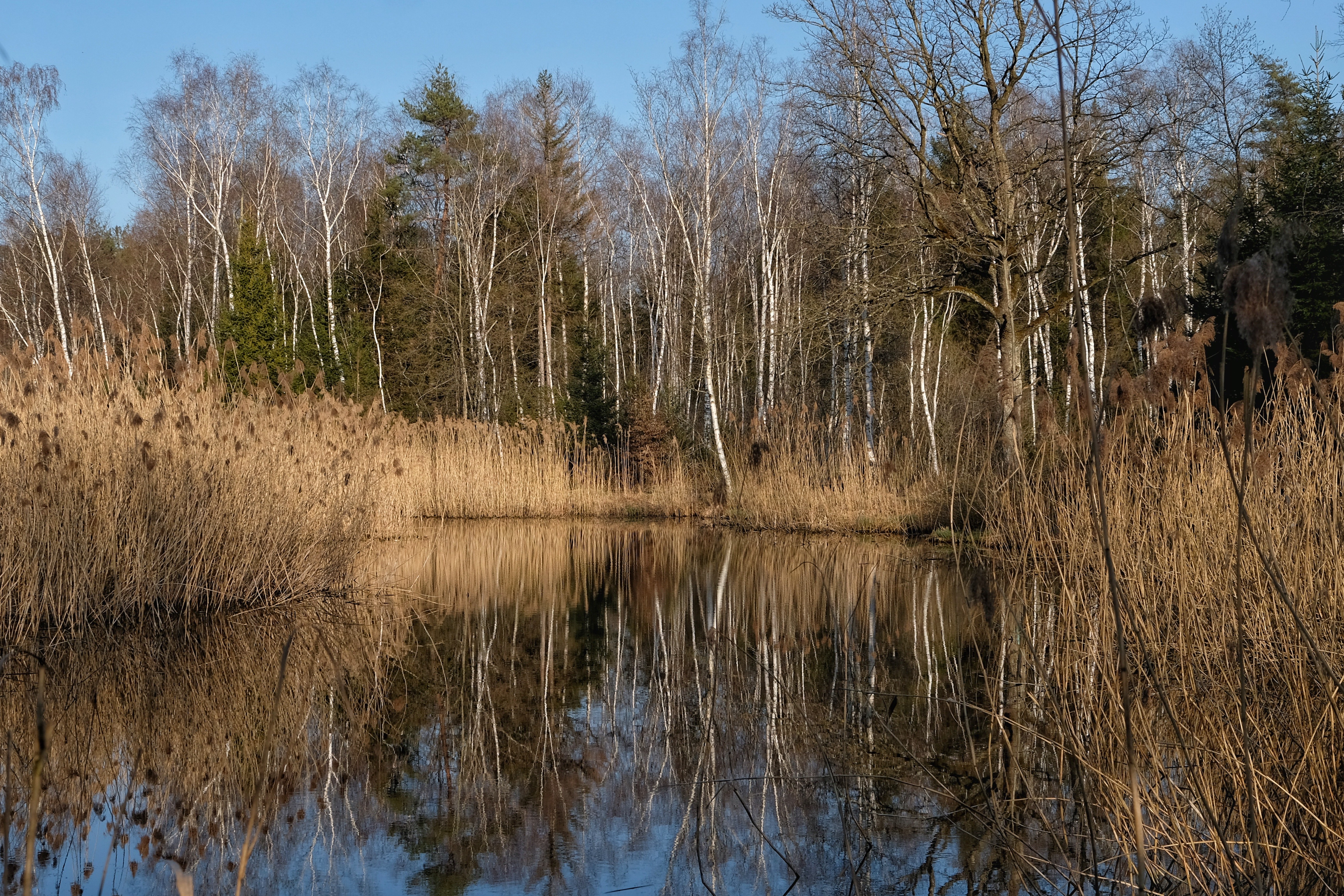
- Reed Belt in Hudelmoos
- Interactive map of Hudelmoos
- Location: Switzerland (municipalities of Zihlschlacht-Sitterdorf, Amriswil, and Muolen)
- Coordinates: 47°31′22″N 9°17′18″E
- Area: 40 hectares (99 acres)
- Elevation: 515 metres (1,690 ft)
- Established: 1979

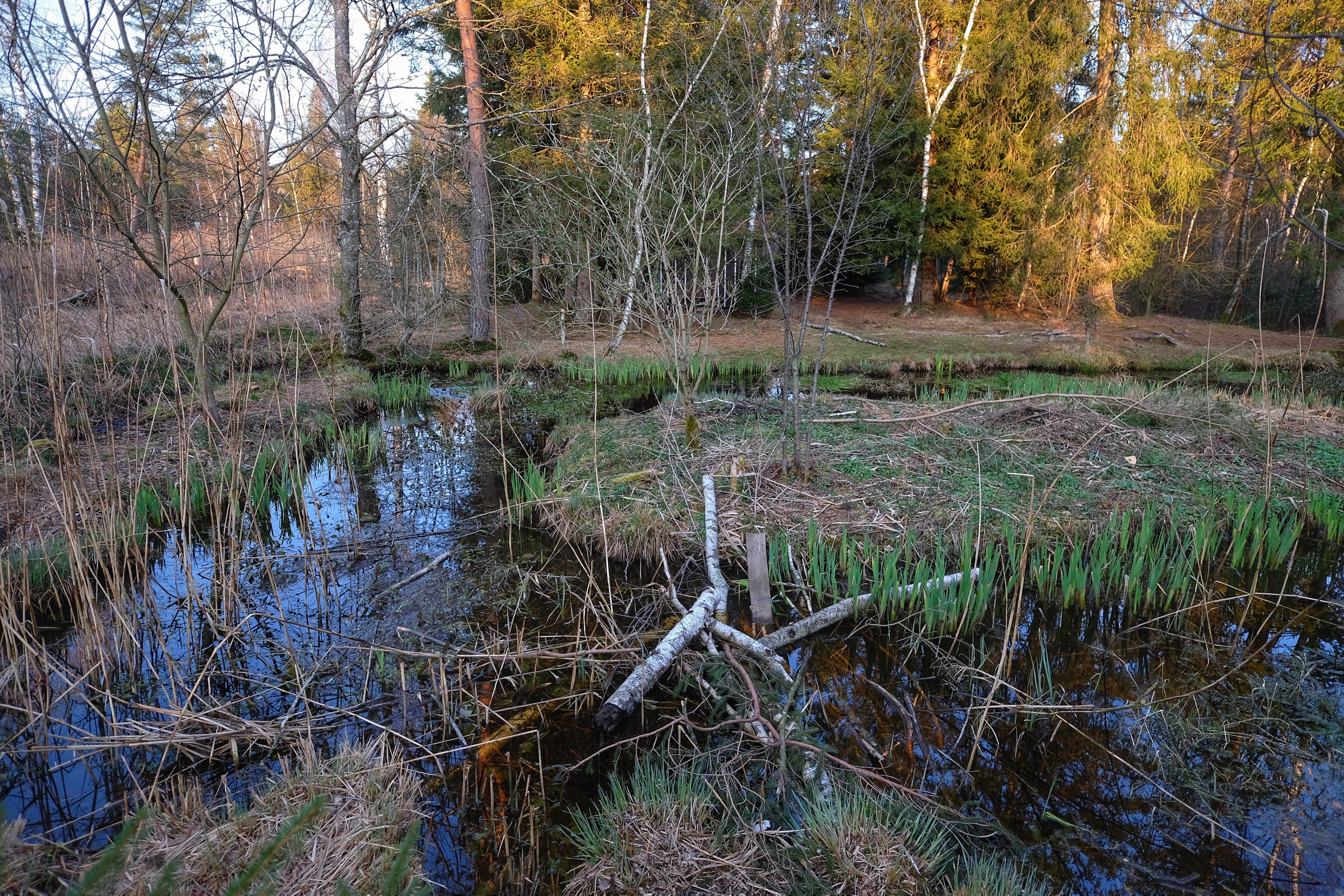
Hudelmoos in March

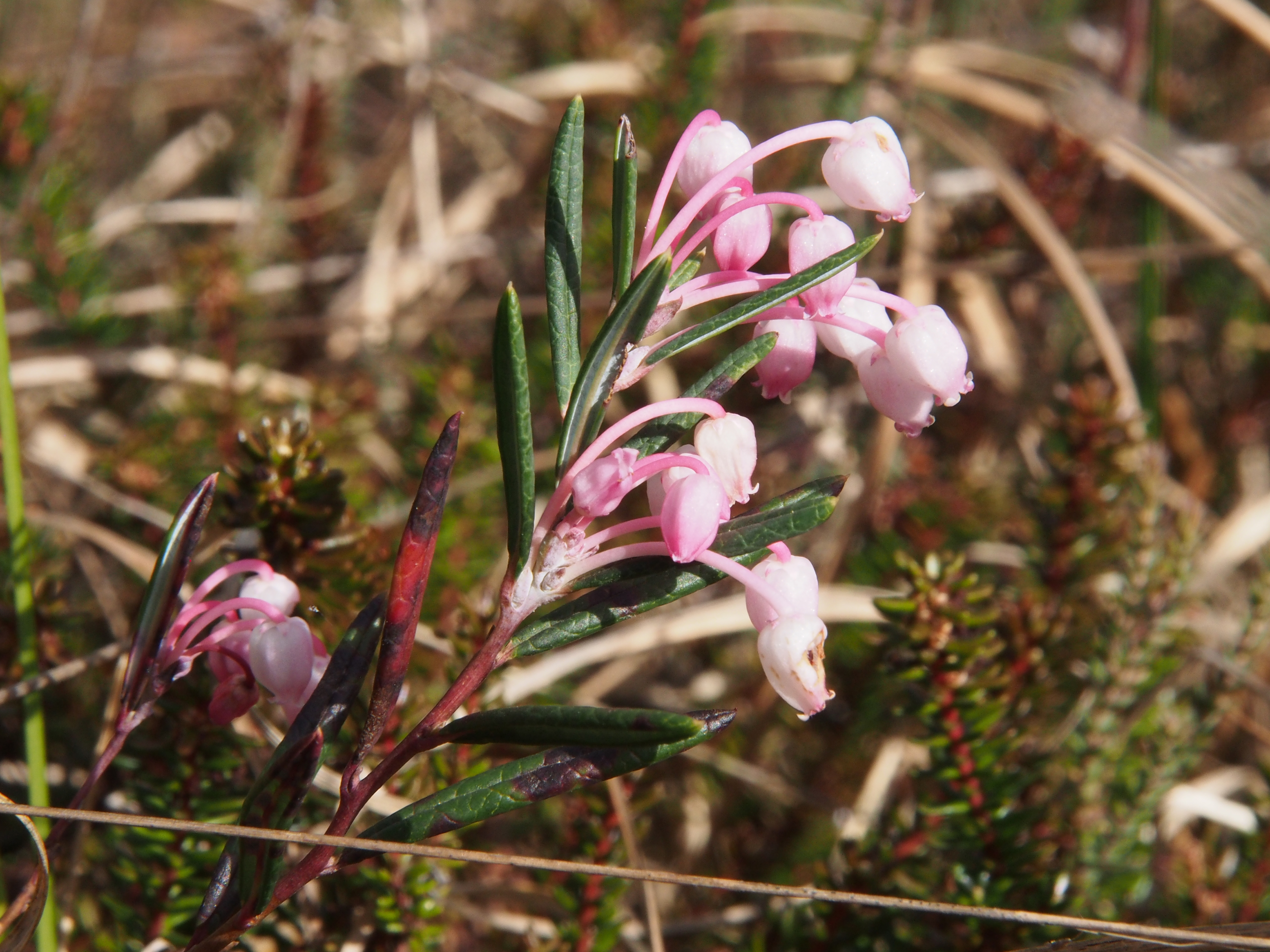
Andromeda polifolia, a common plant in the area

Hudelmoos is a raised bog and nature reserve in the municipalities of Zihlschlacht-Sitterdorf and Amriswil (Thurgau), and Muolen (St. Gallen), in Switzerland. The bog encompasses 40 hectares (99 acres) and consists mostly of sparse birch forest, with a soft forest floor and multiple streams and ponds. The nature reserve is accessible by multiple trails.

== Creation ==
The Hudelmoos area is a moraine landscape, formed by the Rhine Glacier. Following the retreat of the ice masses, small lakes started forming in lower-lying areas, from which the raised bog developed after thousands of years. The name "Hudelmoos" originated as a name in the local dialect for a low-yielding bog. Historically, it was used as common land by the surrounding settlements.

== Peat harvesting ==
From around 1750 until the mid-20th century, inhabitants of the surrounding villages (e.g., Räuchlisberg) harvested peat to meat increased energy demands. The peat was typically used as heating for houses, especially during times of war. Although Hudelmoos was considered to be low-yielding, it was intensively used by the local population. Before the peat harvesting, the peat layer was 6 metres (20 ft) Today, it is at most 1.5 metres (4.9 ft), with some places reduced to the water-retaining subsoil. Peat formation takes a long time – each meter of solid peat takes approximately 1000 years to form. Following World War II, the area was left to nature to regenerate.

== Nature reserve ==
Hudelmoos has been designated as a nature reserve since 1979, and was included in the Bundesinventar für Hoch- und Übergangsmoore (Federal Inventory of Raised Bogs and Transition Mires) in 1991. Parts of the reserve have been designated as fens of national importance since 1994. Due to the severe threat to amphibians in Switzerland, Hudelmoos has been recognized in the federal inventory since 2001 due to its status as an important amphibian breeding ground. Multiple necessary protection measures are implemented to ensure that the areas do not become overgrown and silted up. In particular, water quality is consistently monitored and if necessary, improved for the betterment of the bog and its amphibian inhabitants. Today, Hudelmoos is a unique example of remarkable biodiversity when it comes to birds, butterflies, dragonflies, vascular plants, mosses und fungi. Particularly noteworthy are bog cranberries, bog-rosemary, sundew, and crested wood fern. The bog is accessible via hiking trails and has become a popular local recreation area.
