= Bleiken =

Bleiken may refer to:

- Bleiken bei Oberdiessbach, a former municipality in the canton of Bern, Switzerland
- Bleiken, Thurgau, a former local commune (Ortsgemeinde) in the canton of Thurgau, Switzerland
