= Götighofen =

Village in Thurgau, Switzerland

- Former municipality
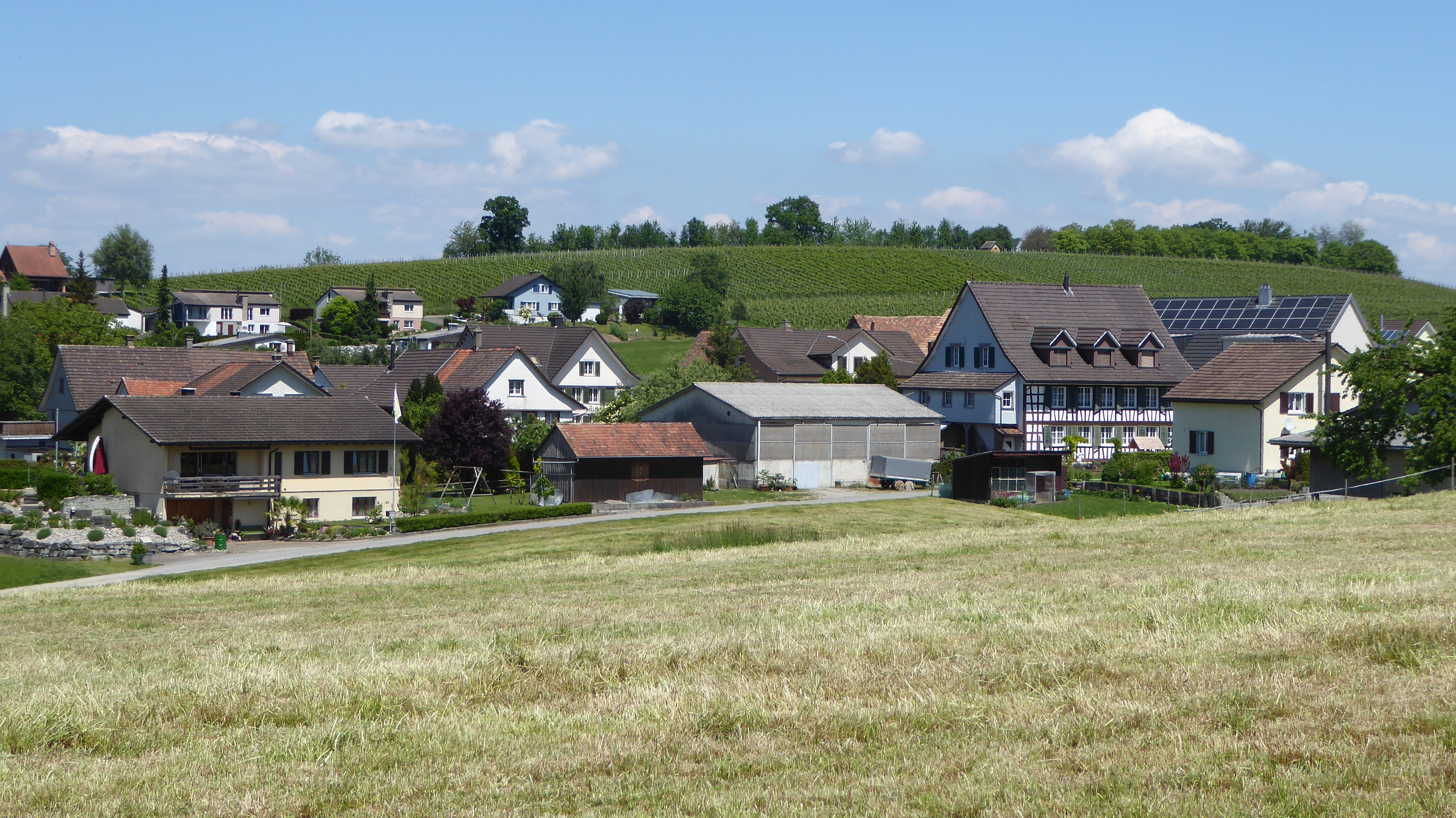
- Location of Götighofen
- Location within Switzerland Location within Canton of Thurgau
- Coordinates: 47.5363°N 9.2172°E
- Country: Switzerland
- Canton: Thurgau
- District: Bischofszell
- Municipality: Sulgen

Population (1990)
  - Total: 161
- Time zone: UTC+01:00 (CET)
  - Summer (DST): UTC+02:00 (CEST)
- ISO 3166 code: CH-TG
- Website

Götighofen is a former Ortsgemeinde (local commune) in the canton of Thurgau, Switzerland, which has been part of the municipality of Sulgen since 1996. The street village (Strassendorf) lies away from the main roads on a hill between the valleys of the Thur and the Aach. From 1803 to 1995 it formed an Ortsgemeinde of the Munizipalgemeinde (municipal commune) of Sulgen.

== History ==
Götighofen is first mentioned in 829 as Cotinchova. Before 1798, part of Götighofen belonged to the low court of Heldswil (lordship of Bürglen), part to the low court of Hessenreuti (lordship of Bürglen from 1664) and part to the low court of Hüttenswil (lordship of the Prince-Abbey of St. Gall and lordship of Bürglen). In church matters Götighofen always belonged to the parish of Sulgen (56 Reformed and 21 Catholic inhabitants in 1649).

In the 18th and 19th centuries grain growing, viticulture and livestock farming were practiced. Embroidery, widespread around 1900, survived in Götighofen until 1985 (the Hörler embroidery works). In the 20th century dairy farming, fruit growing and viticulture dominated. Despite a recent neighborhood of single-family houses, Götighofen has remained a farming village.

The population was 189 in 1850, 200 in 1888, 185 in 1900, 167 in 1950, 126 in 1970 and 161 in 1990.

== Bibliography ==
- E. Menolfi, Sanktgallische Untertanen im Thurgau, 1980, pp. 11–12, 24
- E. Menolfi, Bürglen, 1996, pp. 30–31, 52–53
