= Kümmertshausen =

Village in Thurgau, Switzerland

- Former municipality
- Location of Kümmertshausen
- Location within Switzerland Location within Canton of Thurgau
- Coordinates: 47.565553°N 9.240507°E
- Country: Switzerland
- Canton: Thurgau
- District: Bischofszell
- Municipality: Erlen

Population (1990)
  - Total: 241
- Time zone: UTC+01:00 (CET)
  - Summer (DST): UTC+02:00 (CEST)
- ISO 3166 code: CH-TG
- Website

Kümmertshausen is a former Ortsgemeinde (local commune) in the canton of Thurgau, Switzerland, now part of the municipality of Erlen. The farming village lies away from the main roads, north-west of Amriswil. With Kratz, Pulvershaus and Unter-Löwenhaus, it was an Ortsgemeinde of the Munizipalgemeinde (municipal commune) of Erlen from 1803 to 1994.

== History ==
Kümmertshausen is possibly first mentioned in 771 as Chuniberteswilari; it is recorded in 1245 as Cuonbrechsus. In the late Middle Ages the advocacy (Vogtei) of Kümmertshausen was held by citizens of Constance. In 1471 Hans Lanz von Liebenfels, steward (Hofmeister) of the bishop of Constance, sold the advocacies of Kümmertshausen and Sommeri to the Abbey of Saint Gall. Until 1798 Kümmertshausen was part of the criminal court (Malefizgericht) of Sommeri, while Kratz belonged to the lordship of Oberaach and Unter-Löwenhaus to the court of Hefenhofen. Kümmertshausen, which became Reformed, always belonged to the parish of Sommeri.

Arable farming and fruit growing predominated until the beginning of the 19th century; later, livestock and dairy farming dominated (a cheese dairy is mentioned in 1862). In 1830 calico and linen weaving flourished, and two embroidery works (26 employees in 1878) brought a brief upswing. Around 1980 housing developments were built on the western and eastern edges of the village.

The population was 268 in 1850, 222 in 1900, 243 in 1950 and 241 in 1990.

== Bibliography ==
- E. Leisi, Geschichte von Amriswil und Umgebung, 1957
