= Anna Vock =

- Born: 13 January 1885; Aargau, Switzerland
- Died: 4 December 1962 (aged 77); Zürich, Switzerland
- Other name: Mammina
- Occupations: Journalist, Activist
- Organization: Amitica
- Title: Editor of Der Kreis
- Term: 1933–1942
- Successor: Karl Meir

Anna Vock (13 January 1885 – 4 December 1962) was a Swiss journalist, organizer, and LGBT activist during the interwar period in Switzerland. Although lesbianism was not criminalized like male homosexuality in Switzerland during her activist period, Vock faced public recrimination for her work in publishing, was monitored by police, and arrested.

== Amaticia ==
Anna (nicknamed "Mammina") Vock was born on 13 January 1885 in Anglikon, Aargau. Little is known about her early life or educational background.

In 1931, with Laura Thoma, Vock formed the group Amiticia, taking the position of secretary. The aim of the organization was to relieve the isolation of lesbians and through strong associations promote acceptance and visibility. The original ad in lesbian magazine Garçonne proclaimed: "Sisters of Lesbos, you too have a full right to love and its freedom." In October of the same year, Volk joined the gay organization Excentric-Club – Zürich and made it an integrated organization, in which Volk herself became president in 1933.

== Freundschaftsbanner / Der Kreis ==
In 1932, Thoma and EZC member August Bambula founded the magazine Freundschaftsbanner, which changed its name several times, eventually becoming Der Kreis ("the circle", 1942–1967), the primary homosexual publication in Europe. Vock was involved at the beginning, focusing on the women's section and personal ads, but became more and more involved, eventually becoming the editor and publisher of the magazine from 1933 to 1942.

During her time as editor, Volk was targeted by multiple sources for her work on the paper. The tabloid magazines Scheinwerfer and Guggu published her real name and addresses after she had started working under the pen name Mammina, resulting in the loss of several jobs. She was charged with "acting as a pander" for her work in the personal ads, but later acquitted on appeal, and arrested on suspicion of communist activity, but released.

Karl Meier, who succeeded Volk as editor of Der Kreis in 1943, published his obituary in the magazine. "Farewell, Mammina. Your name will remain forever united to our cause in Switzerland. You prepared the ground on which we must build. Hopefully we will succeed."
