= Schocherswil =

Village in Thurgau, Switzerland

- Former municipality
- Location of Schocherswil
- Location within Switzerland Location within Canton of Thurgau
- Coordinates: 47.5381°N 9.2674°E
- Country: Switzerland
- Canton: Thurgau
- District: Bischofszell
- Municipality: Amriswil

Population (1990)
  - Total: 290
- Time zone: UTC+01:00 (CET)
  - Summer (DST): UTC+02:00 (CEST)
- ISO 3166 code: CH-TG
- Website

Schocherswil is a former Ortsgemeinde (local commune) in the canton of Thurgau, Switzerland, which has been part of the municipality of Amriswil since 1997. The village lies on a hill in the Aach valley, 2 km (1.2 mi) south-west of Amriswil. From 1803 to 1996 it formed an Ortsgemeinde in the Munizipalgemeinde (municipal commune) of Zihlschlacht.

== History ==
Schocherswil is probably first mentioned in 883 as Wilare; it is recorded in 1359 as ze dem hangenden Wile and in 1413 as Schocherswylen. Excavations in 1963–1967 at the Burgstock west of the village point to a medieval motte, probably inhabited in the 13th century by the von Wiler family, ministeriales of the bishop of Constance. The low court of Schocherswil belonged to the lordship of Eppishausen, which received an Offnung (record of customary law) in 1447 and was held by the von Helmsdorf family as a fief of the bishop of Constance from 1372 to 1535. From 1698 to 1798 the lordship was owned by Muri Abbey. In church matters Schocherswil, Reformed since 1529, always shared the fate of Sommeri. A Chrischona congregation has existed there since 1873.

Grain growing under the three-field system formed the economic basis, alongside fruit growing, grass growing and, until 1900, viticulture. Potatoes were grown from 1817, and a cheese dairy was set up in 1864. Small trades included a bakery, a butcher's shop and a cooperage. A mechanical embroidery works existed from 1878 to 1895.

The population was 238 in 1831, 200 in 1850, 224 in 1900, 254 in 1950 and 290 in 1990.

== Bibliography ==
- H. Stäheli-Bartholdi, 1100 Jahre Schocherswil 883–1983, [1983]
- Hinweisinventar Thurgau: Amriswil VI, Räuchlisberg/Schocherswil, manuscript, 2004 (State Archives of Thurgau)
