= Schönenberg an der Thur =

Coordinates: 47°31′15″N 9°11′52″E

Coat of arms of Schönenberg an der Thur

Schönenberg an der Thur is a village and former municipality in the canton of Thurgau, Switzerland.

In 1996 the municipality was merged with the neighboring municipalities of Buhwil, Kradolf, and Neukirch an der Thur to form the new municipality of Kradolf-Schönenberg.

Schönenberg an der Thur is first mentioned in 883 as Thuruftisthorf. In 1359 it was mentioned as Schönnenberg.

The population in 1831 was 190 people, and by 1870 it had increased to 254. In 1910 there were 820 people. The population in 1960 was 813 and in 1995 it had increased to 1,249.
