= Erlen =

- Municipality
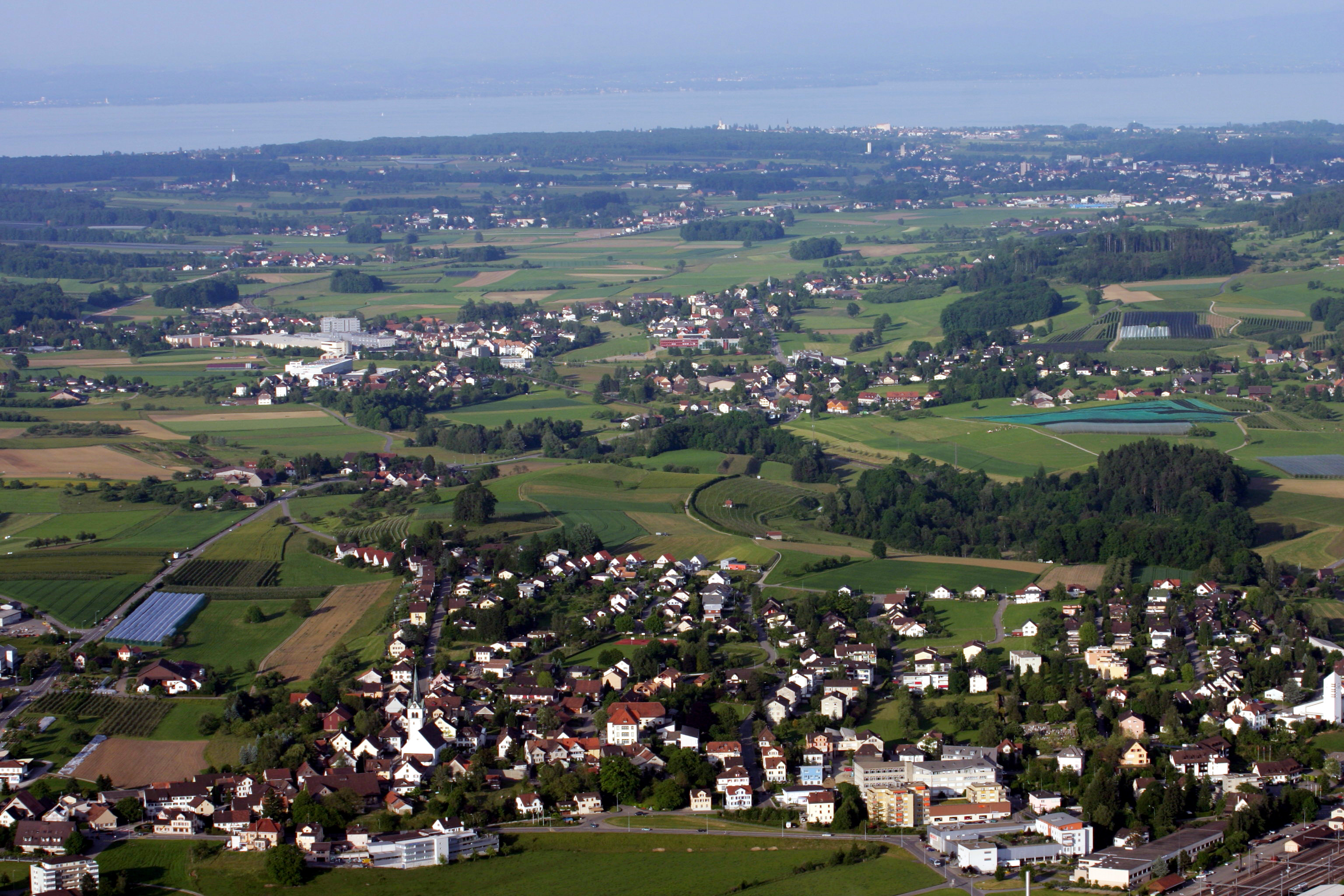

- Coat of arms
- Location of Erlen
- Location within Switzerland Location within Canton of Thurgau
- Coordinates: 47°33′N 9°14′E
- Country: Switzerland
- Canton: Thurgau
- District: Weinfelden

Area
  - Total: 12.19 km^{2} (4.71 sq mi)
- Elevation: 455 m (1,493 ft)

Population (December 2007)
  - Total: 3,078
  - Density: 252.5/km^{2} (654.0/sq mi)
- Time zone: UTC+01:00 (CET)
  - Summer (DST): UTC+02:00 (CEST)
- Postal code: 8586
- SFOS number: 4476
- ISO 3166 code: CH-TG
- Surrounded by: Amriswil, Birwinken, Hohentannen, Langrickenbach, Sommeri, Sulgen, Zihlschlacht-Sitterdorf
- Website: www.erlen.ch

Erlen is a municipality in Weinfelden District in the canton of Thurgau in Switzerland.

== History ==
The current municipality was formed in 1995 from the smaller communities of Erlen, Buchackern, Engishofen, Ennetaach, Kümmertshausen and Riedt. The section of Erlen known as Ehstegen was first mentioned in 838 as Escislec.

Before 1798 Erlen belonged in the so-called Hohen Gerichte, which was directly under the authority of the Confederation governor of Thurgau. Eppishausen and a house in Erlen were part of the Gerichtsherrschaft (a combination of court and manor rights) of Eppishausen. Ehstegen was part of the Oberaach fief of the Abbey of St. Gall and until 1812 formed its own municipality.

In 1764 a Reformed Church was built in Erlen, though it remained part of the parish of Sulgen. The church cemetery was built in 1819 and in 1992 it finally became an independent parish. The Catholics in Erlen remained part of the Catholic parish of Sulgen.

The Brunschweiler family from Schocherswil settled in Erlen in 1652 and promoted the spread of spinning and weaving as a cottage industry. Erlen attained some importance in the 17th and 18th centuries through the linen trade and dyeing. By the 19th century, mechanical embroidery was also added to the local industry. Larger social and structural changes in Erlen occurred since 1951, when the growing steel company Lista AG built a steel factory in town. The factory employed about 350 workers in 2004, down from the nearly 700 that they employed in 1990.

== Geography ==
Erlen has an area, as of 2009, of 12.19 square kilometers (4.71 sq mi). Of this area, 8.69 km^{2} (3.36 sq mi) or 71.3% is used for agricultural purposes, while 1.81 km^{2} (0.70 sq mi) or 14.8% is forested. Of the rest of the land, 1.63 km^{2} (0.63 sq mi) or 13.4% is settled (buildings or roads), 0.06 km^{2} (15 acres) or 0.5% is either rivers or lakes and 0.04 km^{2} (9.9 acres) or 0.3% is unproductive land.

Of the built up area, industrial buildings made up 5.7% of the total area while housing and buildings made up 1.1% and transportation infrastructure made up 0.7%. Power and water infrastructure as well as other special developed areas made up 3.4% of the area while parks, green belts and sports fields made up 2.5%. Out of the forested land, 13.0% of the total land area is heavily forested and 1.8% is covered with orchards or small clusters of trees. Of the agricultural land, 52.3% is used for growing crops, while 18.9% is used for orchards or vine crops. Of the water in the municipality, 0.2% is in lakes and 0.2% is in rivers and streams.

The municipality is located in Weinfelden District. It consists of the linear village of Erlen and the former communities of Buchackern, Engishofen, Ennetaach, and Kümmertshausen as well as Riedt (which used to be part of the municipality of Sulgen). The village of Erlen consists of the sections of Erlen-Dorf, Ehstegen and Eppishausen.

== Demographics ==
Erlen has a population (as of December 2020) of 3,802. As of 2008, 19.5% of the population are foreign nationals. Over the last 10 years (1997–2007) the population has changed at a rate of 2.1%. Most of the population (as of 2000) speaks German (90.2%), with Albanian being second most common ( 3.7%) and Italian being third ( 2.3%).

As of 2008, the gender distribution of the population was 49.3% male and 50.7% female. The population was made up of 1,203 Swiss men (38.7% of the population), and 329 (10.6%) non-Swiss men. There were 1,298 Swiss women (41.8%), and 277 (8.9%) non-Swiss women.

In 2008 there were 16 live births to Swiss citizens and 13 births to non-Swiss citizens, and in same time span there were 21 deaths of Swiss citizens and 2 non-Swiss citizen deaths. Ignoring immigration and emigration, the population of Swiss citizens decreased by 5 while the foreign population increased by 11. There were 2 Swiss men who emigrated from Switzerland to another country, 4 Swiss women who emigrated from Switzerland to another country, 13 non-Swiss men who emigrated from Switzerland to another country and 8 non-Swiss women who emigrated from Switzerland to another country. The total Swiss population change in 2008 (from all sources) was a decrease of 14 and the non-Swiss population change was an increase of 33 people. This represents a population growth rate of 0.6%.

The age distribution, as of 2009, in Erlen is; 323 children or 10.3% of the population are between 0 and 9 years old and 447 teenagers or 14.3% are between 10 and 19. Of the adult population, 436 people or 13.9% of the population are between 20 and 29 years old. 364 people or 11.6% are between 30 and 39, 574 people or 18.3% are between 40 and 49, and 441 people or 14.1% are between 50 and 59. The senior population distribution is 286 people or 9.1% of the population are between 60 and 69 years old, 165 people or 5.3% are between 70 and 79, there are 85 people or 2.7% who are between 80 and 89, and there are 14 people or 0.4% who are 90 and older.

As of 2000, there were 1,120 private households in the municipality, and an average of 2.7 persons per household. In 2000 there were 477 single family homes (or 79.2% of the total) out of a total of 602 inhabited buildings. There were 51 two family buildings (8.5%), 15 three family buildings (2.5%) and 59 multi-family buildings (or 9.8%). There were 598 (or 19.5%) persons who were part of a couple without children, and 1,884 (or 61.4%) who were part of a couple with children. There were 169 (or 5.5%) people who lived in single parent home, while there are 16 persons who were adult children living with one or both parents, 6 persons who lived in a household made up of relatives, 27 who lived in a household made up of unrelated persons, and 79 who are either institutionalized or live in another type of collective housing.

The vacancy rate for the municipality, in 2008, was 5.22%. As of 2007, the construction rate of new housing units was 1.9 new units per 1000 residents. In 2000 there were 1,253 apartments in the municipality. The most common apartment size was the 4 room apartment of which there were 358. There were 18 single room apartments and 248 apartments with six or more rooms. As of 2000 the average price to rent an average apartment in Erlen was 994.51 Swiss francs (CHF) per month (US$800, £450, €640 approx. exchange rate from 2000). The average rate for a one-room apartment was 660.00 CHF (US$530, £300, €420), a two-room apartment was about 599.36 CHF (US$480, £270, €380), a three-room apartment was about 806.15 CHF (US$640, £360, €520) and a six or more room apartment cost an average of 1472.35 CHF (US$1180, £660, €940). The average apartment price in Erlen was 89.1% of the national average of 1116 CHF.

In the 2007 federal election the most popular party was the SVP which received 49.14% of the vote. The next three most popular parties were the CVP (12.62%), the FDP (11.23%) and the SP (8.35%). In the federal election, a total of 844 votes were cast, and the voter turnout was 43.1%.

The historical population is given in the following table:

year	population
1870	1,127
1950	1,453
1970	1,857
1990	2,298
1950	611
1970	1,006
2000	3,068^{a}

^a Population for the entire, combined municipality

== Sights ==
The entire village of Erlen-Eppishausen is designated as part of the Inventory of Swiss Heritage Sites.

== Economy ==
As of 2007, Erlen had an unemployment rate of 1.74%. As of 2005, there were 208 people employed in the primary economic sector and about 56 businesses involved in this sector. 571 people are employed in the secondary sector and there are 41 businesses in this sector. 392 people are employed in the tertiary sector, with 76 businesses in this sector.

In 2000 there were 2,167 workers who lived in the municipality. Of these, 990 or about 45.7% of the residents worked outside Erlen while 693 people commuted into the municipality for work. There were a total of 1,870 jobs (of at least 6 hours per week) in the municipality. Of the working population, 7.1% used public transportation to get to work, and 50.9% used a private car.

== Religion ==
From the 2000 census, 908 or 29.6% were Roman Catholic, while 1,460 or 47.6% belonged to the Swiss Reformed Church. Of the rest of the population, there are 39 individuals (or about 1.27% of the population) who belong to the Orthodox Church, and there are 119 individuals (or about 3.88% of the population) who belong to another Christian church. There were 238 (or about 7.76% of the population) who are Islamic. There are 7 individuals (or about 0.23% of the population) who belong to another church (not listed on the census), 168 (or about 5.48% of the population) belong to no church, are agnostic or atheist, and 129 individuals (or about 4.20% of the population) did not answer the question.

== Transport ==
Erlen sits on the Winterthur–Romanshorn line between Wil and Romanshorn and is served by the St. Gallen S-Bahn at Erlen railway station.

== Education ==
The entire Swiss population is generally well educated. In Erlen about 66.8% of the population (between age 25 and 64) have completed either non-mandatory upper secondary education or additional higher education (either university or a Fachhochschule).

Erlen is home to the Erlen-Riedt-Ennetaach primary and secondary school district. In the 2008/2009 school year there are 420 students at either the primary or secondary levels. There are 85 children in the kindergarten, and the average class size is 17 kindergartners. Of the children in kindergarten, 40 or 47.1% are female, 21 or 24.7% are not Swiss citizens and 22 or 25.9% do not speak German natively. The lower and upper primary levels begin at about age 5-6 and lasts for 6 years. There are 121 children in who are at the lower primary level and 127 children in the upper primary level. The average class size in the primary school is 20.67 students. At the lower primary level, there are 56 children or 46.3% of the total population who are female, 32 or 26.4% are not Swiss citizens and 28 or 23.1% do not speak German natively. In the upper primary level, there are 67 or 52.8% who are female, 28 or 22.0% are not Swiss citizens and 26 or 20.5% do not speak German natively.

At the secondary level, students are divided according to performance. The secondary level begins at about age 12 and usually lasts 3 years. There are 93 teenagers who are in the advanced school, of which 42 or 45.2% are female, 5 or 5.4% are not Swiss citizens and 8 or 8.6% do not speak German natively. There are 79 teenagers who are in the standard school, of which 33 or 41.8% are female, 13 or 16.5% are not Swiss citizens and 16 or 20.3% do not speak German natively. The average class size for all classes at the secondary level is 19.11 students.
