= Neukirch an der Thur =

Coordinates: 47.511°N 9.173°E

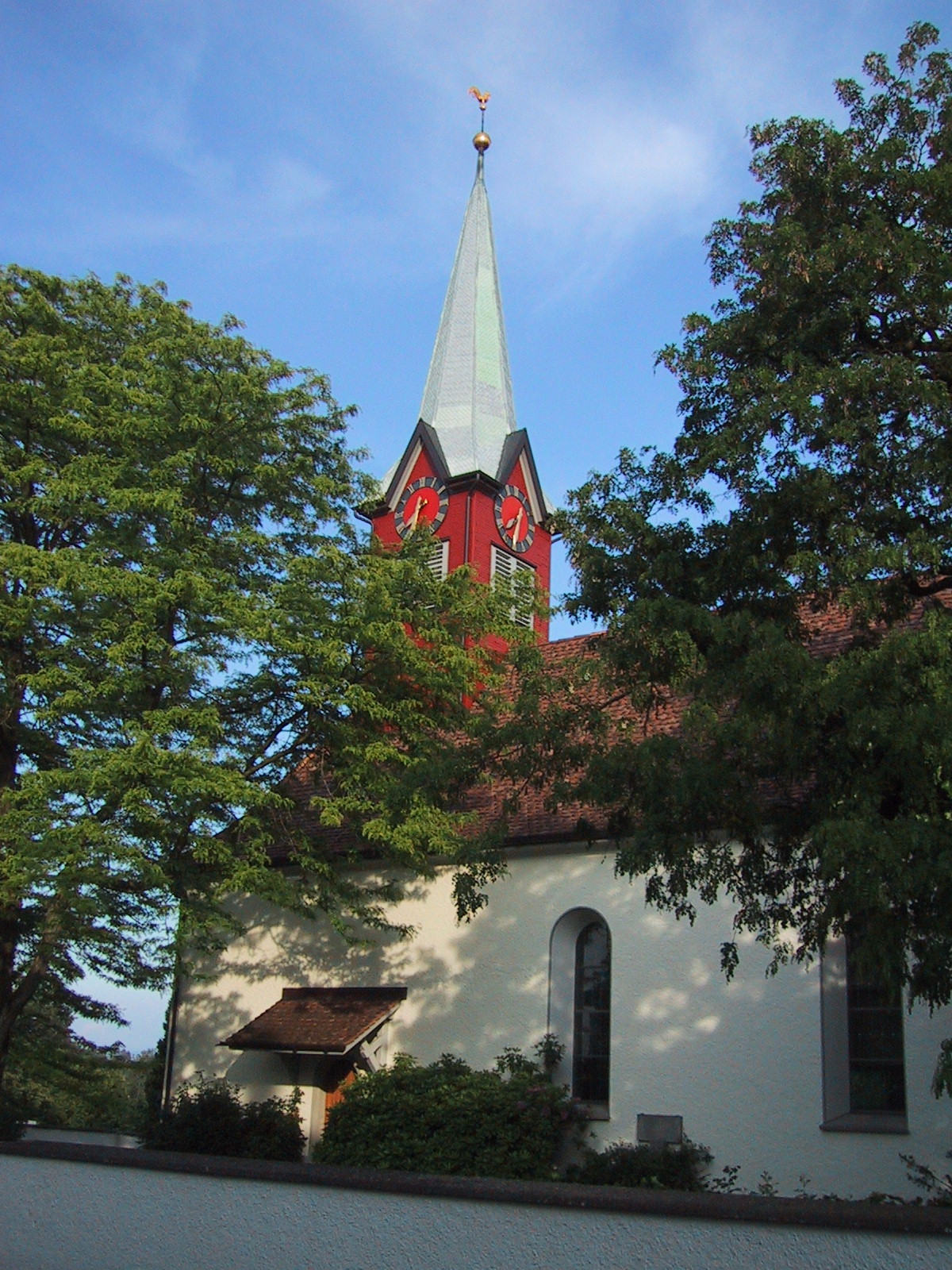
A church in Neukirch an der Thur.

Neukirch an der Thur is a village and former municipality in the Canton of Thurgau, Switzerland. In 1996, the municipality was merged with the neighboring municipalities of Buhwil, Kradolf and Schönenberg an der Thur to form a new and larger municipality Kradolf-Schönenberg.

== History ==
Neukirch an der Thur is first mentioned in 1291 as Eliswil. In 1296 it was mentioned as Sêliswille, which remained its name until the Protestant Reformation. After 1520 it was known as Nüwenkilchen.

== Demographics ==
The population in 1850 was 2,546. It decreased in 1900 to 1,921 and continued to drop so that in 1950 it was 1,879. By 1990 it had increased slightly to 1,997.
