= Karl Meier =

Swiss actor (1897–1974)

Karl Meier (16 March 1897 – 29 March 1974) was a Swiss actor influential in the European LGBT social movement. He was a member of the socially active Cabaret Cornichon company, and editor for the gay magazine Der Kreis (The Circle), which he edited under the pen name "Rolf".

== Life ==
Meier was born the illegitimate son of Elizabeth Glätterin Rheiner in St. Gallen on 16 March 1897, and baptised as Rudolf Carl Rheiner. As a toddler he was taken into care by the childless couple Thomas and Wilhelmina Meier-Götsch in Kradolf and adopted by them in 1912. The whereabouts of his birth mother after 1907 are unknown.

In 1912 Meier completed an apprenticeship to a silk weaving enterprise in Schönenberg. His wish, however, was to become an actor. Through the intervention of his understanding boss, he was transferred to the company headquarters in Zürich. Here he took acting lessons and worked with travelling companies. After years of travel in Switzerland, he moved in 1924 to perform in Germany. In 1932 he returned to Switzerland, where he first appeared at the Städtebundtheater Biel-Solothurn and then in the Stadttheater Schaffhausen. From 1935 to 1947 Meier worked for the Cabaret Cornichon. He would also star in radio plays and in the movies Fusilier Wipf (1938), Bergführer Lorenz (1943), and Hinter den sieben Gleisen (1959).

As editor of the gay magazine Der Kreis, Meier became internationally known under his pseudonym "Rolf". The paper had been founded in 1932 under the name Schweizerisches Freundschaftsbanner, (Note: Swiss Friendship Banner) changing in 1937 to Menschenrecht, (Note: Human Rights) with Meier changing it to Der Kreis on becoming editor in 1942. With homosexuality illegal throughout most of Europe the paper was forced to operate on a subscription-based model. Meier wrote political commentaries, reviewed literature and managed the subscriber list. Several times a year he organised masked balls and other events associated with the paper.

In 1970 he suffered a stroke during a rehearsal at the Theater am Hechtplatz on Limmatquai in Zürich. Cared for by his partner, Meier died in Zürich on 29 March 1974 and was buried in Sulgen at his request. A few of his papers have been preserved by the State Archives of Thurgau.

Meier was depicted in the 2014 film The Circle, in which he is played by Stefan Witschi.
