= Hohentannen =

- Municipality
- Coat of arms
- Location of Hohentannen
- Location within Switzerland Location within Canton of Thurgau
- Coordinates: 47°30′N 9°13′E
- Country: Switzerland
- Canton: Thurgau
- District: Weinfelden

Area
  - Total: 8 km^{2} (3.1 sq mi)
- Elevation: 570 m (1,870 ft)

Population (December 2007)
  - Total: 607
  - Density: 76/km^{2} (200/sq mi)
- Time zone: UTC+01:00 (CET)
  - Summer (DST): UTC+02:00 (CEST)
- Postal code: 9216
- SFOS number: 4495
- ISO 3166 code: CH-TG
- Surrounded by: Bischofszell, Erlen, Kradolf-Schönenberg, Sulgen, Zihlschlacht-Sitterdorf
- Website: www.hohentannen.ch

Hohentannen is a municipality in Weinfelden District in the canton of Thurgau in Switzerland.

== History ==
Aerial view (1959)

Hohentannen is first mentioned in 1256 as Hontannon. In 1275 it was mentioned as in Hohentannun. From the Middle Ages until 1798, the lower courts were granted as a fief by the Bishop of Constance to Heidelberg. Hohentannen, Sitterdorf, Heidelberg and Oetlishausen all belonged to the parish of Bischofszell. In 1812 Heidelberg and Oetlishausen joined the municipality of Hohentannen, followed in 1874, by the hamlet of Hummelberg. Hohentannen was formerly on the Sulgen-Bischofszell road, but since the road moved into the valley in 1823 the village has been located off any major road. Agricultural and viticulture were replaced at the end of the 19th century by cattle and dairy farming. By 1900, small embroidery businesses were common in the village. Today, the gravel pits are a source of income. Despite the construction of single-family houses Hohentannen has preserved its character as a farming village.

== Geography ==
Hohentannen has an area, as of 2009, of 8 square kilometers (3.1 sq mi). Of this area, 5.86 km^{2} (2.26 sq mi) or 73.3% is used for agricultural purposes, while 1.38 km^{2} (0.53 sq mi) or 17.3% is forested. Of the rest of the land, 0.65 km^{2} (0.25 sq mi) or 8.1% is settled (buildings or roads), 0.1 km^{2} (25 acres) or 1.3% is either rivers or lakes.

Of the built up area, industrial buildings made up 3.3% of the total area while housing and buildings made up 0.1% and transportation infrastructure made up 2.3%. while parks, green belts and sports fields made up 2.5%. Out of the forested land, 16.1% of the total land area is heavily forested and 1.1% is covered with orchards or small clusters of trees. Of the agricultural land, 58.4% is used for growing crops, while 14.9% is used for orchards or vine crops. All the water in the municipality is flowing water.

The municipality is located in Weinfelden District, in the heights north-east of Bischofszell. It consists of the villages of Hohentannen, Oetlishausen, Heidelberg and Heldswil.

== Demographics ==
Hohentannen has a population (as of December 2020) of 612 As of 2008, 6.2% of the population are foreign nationals. Over the last 10 years (1997–2007) the population has changed at a rate of 2.7%. Most of the population (as of 2000) speaks German(96.9%), with Serbo-Croatian being second most common ( 0.9%) and Portuguese being third ( 0.5%).

As of 2008, the gender distribution of the population was 52.3% male and 47.7% female. The population was made up of 298 Swiss men (48.4% of the population), and 24 (3.9%) non-Swiss men. There were 280 Swiss women (45.5%), and 14 (2.3%) non-Swiss women.

In 2008 there were 5 live births to Swiss citizens and births to non-Swiss citizens, and in same time span there were 2 deaths of Swiss citizens and 1 non-Swiss citizen death. Ignoring immigration and emigration, the population of Swiss citizens increased by 3 while the foreign population decreased by 1. There were 7 non-Swiss men who emigrated from Switzerland to another country and 1 non-Swiss woman who emigrated from Switzerland to another country. The total Swiss population change in 2008 (from all sources) was a decrease of 0 and the non-Swiss population change was an increase of 6 people. This represents a population growth rate of 1.0%.

The age distribution, as of 2009, in Hohentannen is; 69 children or 11.6% of the population are between 0 and 9 years old and 117 teenagers or 19.7% are between 10 and 19. Of the adult population, 59 people or 9.9% of the population are between 20 and 29 years old. 54 people or 9.1% are between 30 and 39, 130 people or 21.9% are between 40 and 49, and 63 people or 10.6% are between 50 and 59. The senior population distribution is 40 people or 6.7% of the population are between 60 and 69 years old, 34 people or 5.7% are between 70 and 79, there are 25 people or 4.2% who are between 80 and 89, and there are 2 people or 0.3% who are 90 and older.

As of 2000, there were 212 private households in the municipality, and an average of 2.7 persons per household. In 2000 there were 77 single-family homes (or 80.2% of the total) out of a total of 96 inhabited buildings. There were 13 two-family buildings (13.5%), 3 three family buildings (3.1%) and 3 multi-family buildings (or 3.1%). There were 112 (or 19.1%) persons who were part of a couple without children, and 374 (or 63.8%) who were part of a couple with children. There were 31 (or 5.3%) people who lived in single parent home, 6 persons who lived in a household made up of relatives, and 6 who are either institutionalized or live in another type of collective housing.

The vacancy rate for the municipality, in 2008, was 1.23%. As of 2007, the construction rate of new housing units was 3.3 new units per 1000 residents. In 2000 there were 232 apartments in the municipality. The most common apartment size was the 6 room apartment of which there were 75. There were 3 single room apartments and 75 apartments with six or more rooms. As of 2000 the average price to rent an average apartment in Hohentannen was 1105.88 Swiss francs (CHF) per month (US$880, £500, €710 approx. exchange rate from 2000). The average rate for a one-room apartment was 500.00 CHF (US$400, £230, €320), a two-room apartment was about 445.00 CHF (US$360, £200, €280), a three-room apartment was about 829.00 CHF (US$660, £370, €530) and a six or more room apartment cost an average of 1453.00 CHF (US$1160, £650, €930). The average apartment price in Hohentannen was 99.1% of the national average of 1116 CHF.

In the 2007 federal election the most popular party was the SVP which received 52.77% of the vote. The next three most popular parties were the CVP (10.6%), the Green Party (9.38%) and the FDP (8.65%). In the federal election, a total of 208 votes were cast, and the voter turnout was 51.7%.

The historical population is given in the following table:

year	population
1850	672
1900	652
1950	614
1990	529
2000	586

== Sights ==
The entire area of Oetlishausen is designated as part of the Inventory of Swiss Heritage Sites.

== Economy ==
As of 2007, Hohentannen had an unemployment rate of 0.35%. As of 2005, there were 113 people employed in the primary economic sector and about 43 businesses involved in this sector. 45 people are employed in the secondary sector and there are 8 businesses in this sector. 46 people are employed in the tertiary sector, with 15 businesses in this sector.

In 2000 there were 408 workers who lived in the municipality. Of these, 153 or about 37.5% of the residents worked outside Hohentannen while 44 people commuted into the municipality for work. There were a total of 299 jobs (of at least 6 hours per week) in the municipality. Of the working population, 4.3% used public transportation to get to work, and 42.2% used a private car.

== Religion ==
From the 2000 census, 171 or 29.2% were Roman Catholic, while 308 or 52.6% belonged to the Swiss Reformed Church. Of the rest of the population, there was 1 Old Catholic who belonged to the Christian Catholic Church of Switzerland, and there are 41 individuals (or about 7.00% of the population) who belong to another Christian church. There were 9 (or about 1.54% of the population) who are Islamic. 37 (or about 6.31% of the population) belong to no church, are agnostic or atheist, and 19 individuals (or about 3.24% of the population) did not answer the question.

== Education ==
The entire Swiss population is generally well educated. In Hohentannen about 74.5% of the population (between age 25-64) have completed either non-mandatory upper secondary education or additional higher education (either university or a Fachhochschule).
