= Buhwil =

Coordinates: 47°31′37.81″N 9°9′57.56″E

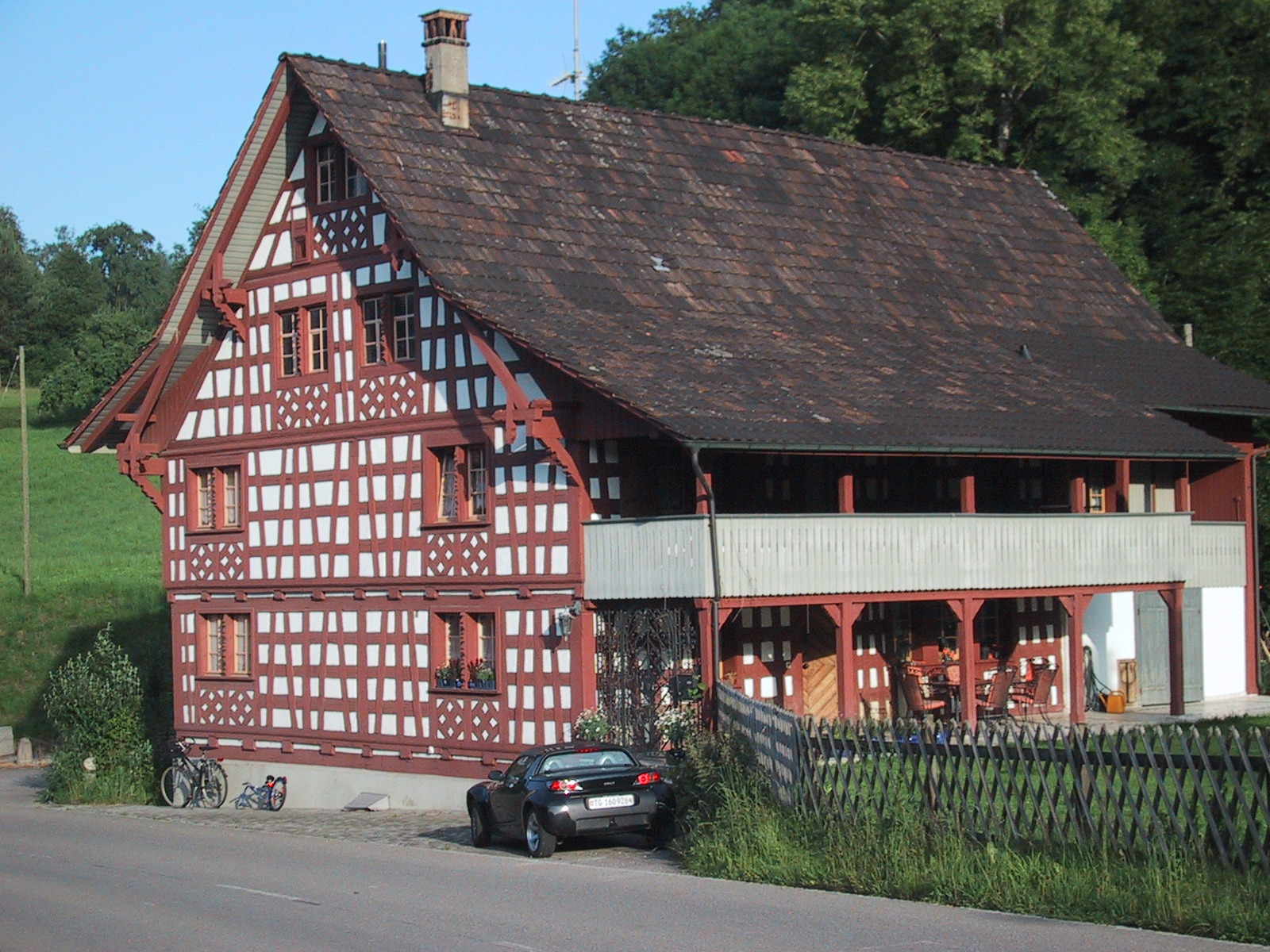
A house in Buhwil.

Buhwil is a village and former municipality in the canton of Thurgau, Switzerland.

It is first mentioned in 838 as Puabinwilare. , The municipality had 320 inhabitants in 1850, which decreased to 283 in 1900, 282 in 1950 and 190 in 1980, and increased to 287 in 1990.

In 1996, the municipality was merged with other neighboring municipalities Kradolf, Neukirch an der Thur and Schönenberg an der Thur to form a new and larger municipality Kradolf-Schönenberg.
