= Der Kreis =

Defunct Swiss gay culture magazine

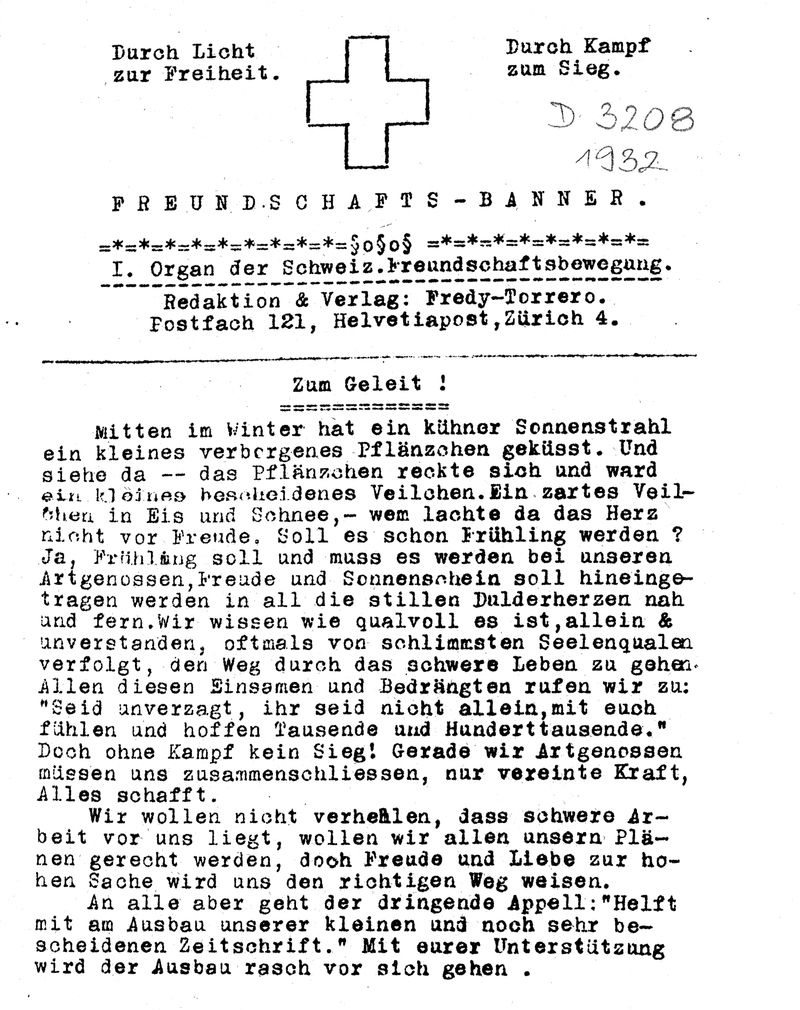
- 1st issue of Freundschaftsbanner from January, 1st, 1932
- Categories: Lifestyle
- First issue: January 1, 1932
- Country: Germany

Der Kreis (German: [deːr ˈkraɪs], The Circle) was a Swiss gay magazine. Founded as the lesbian magazine Freundschaftsbanner in 1932, it turned into a male-only magazine in 1942 under the name Der Kreis. It was trilingual and distributed internationally and gained significant influence in the homosexual movement at the time until it ceased publication in 1967.

== History ==
Der Kreis was first published on January 1, 1932, under the original title Freundschaftsbanner (Friendship Banner) as a joint project of Laura Thoma of Zürich lesbian organization Amicitia and August Bambula of the gay men's Excentric Club Zürich. The first issue was eight pages, credited editor "Fredy-Torrero" (Laura Thoma's alias) and proclaimed two related mottos: "Through light to freedom." and "Through struggle to victory". After a short pause it returned in 1933 under the changed title Schweizerisches Freundschaftsbanner. In 1937 its name changed again to Menschenrecht (Human Rights) and finally to Der Kreis in 1942.

The magazine originally focused on lesbian issues and was political in nature. Lesbianism was not criminalized in Switzerland at the time, unlike male homosexuality. From 1933 to 1942 it was published under the editorial leadership of Anna Vock who initially published under her real name, and later under the pen name "Mammina". Vock and other writers came under attack from the tabloids Sheinwerfer and Guggu in an effort to stoke moral outrage about homosexuality, publishing Vock's home addresses and leading to a repeated loss of employment.

By 1942 most of the lesbian editorial staff had left and the magazine became exclusively focussed on gay male interests; the actor Karl Meier took over as the chief editor in 1942, using the pen name "Rolf", and renamed the magazine Der Kreis (The Circle).

In 1942 the magazine's bimonthly circulation was around 200 copies, and by 1957 this had increased to 1,900, including 700 subscribers throughout Europe and the United States. Der Kreis was published in multiple languages: it was originally written in German, but a French section was added in 1942 and an English section in 1954. It contained news, short stories, poems, photographs, illustrations, and reports on scientific research. Although Swiss publications were censored for much of the duration of magazine's publication, the editors of Der Kreis were noted to have evaded censorship of "racier texts" in the English section since the censors were unable to read them. By and large, the magazine contained very little risqué content since Meier wanted to promote "a high-minded vision of homosexuality" that valued friendship over sex.

The magazine's leadership began to decline in the 1960s, since younger gay readers were more inclined to buy Scandinavian publications that published pornography and nude photographs, and the last issue was published in 1967.

=== Der Kreis-Club ===
The editors of Der Kreis formed a society called Der Kreis-Club, to which all readers were offered membership. The club held weekly meetings in Zürich, where readers gathered to meet other men, discuss current affairs, and listen to lectures hosted by the club; small meetings for French readers were also held in Paris. Der Kreis-Club hosted an international ball in Zürich each year which attracted hundreds of gay men from around Europe. The club disbanded in 1967 when the magazine ceased publication.

== Legacy ==
In Hubert Kennedy's book The Ideal Gay Man, which chronicles the history of Der Kreis, Kennedy describes the magazine as having been "the world's most important journal promoting the legal and social rights of gay men" for much of its publication period and one of very few such journals in Europe at the time. Additionally, it remains the only gay publication to include editorial content in three languages.

In 2014, the magazine's history was documented in a Swiss docudrama film eponymously titled The Circle. The film, which features a mix of historical footage from the 1950s and dramatisations of events, won the Teddy Award and the Panorama Audience Award in the documentary category at the 64th Berlin International Film Festival.
