= Sitterdorf =

Village in Thurgau, Switzerland

- Former municipality
- Sitterdorf from the south in 1923
- Location of Sitterdorf
- Location within Switzerland Location within Canton of Thurgau
- Coordinates: 47.5004°N 9.2389°E
- Country: Switzerland
- Canton: Thurgau
- District: Weinfelden
- Municipality: Zihlschlacht-Sitterdorf

Population (1990)
  - Total: 982
- Time zone: UTC+01:00 (CET)
  - Summer (DST): UTC+02:00 (CEST)
- ISO 3166 code: CH-TG
- Website

Sitterdorf is a former Ortsgemeinde (local commune) in the canton of Thurgau, Switzerland. Since 1997 it has been part of the municipality of Zihlschlacht-Sitterdorf, in the district of Weinfelden. Sitterdorf lies on the Sitter between Bischofszell and Amriswil.

== History ==
Sitterdorf is first mentioned in 787 as Sidruna. A Roman villa was excavated there in 1861. From 787 the estate (Hof) of Sitterdorf belonged to the Abbey of Saint Gall, and from 898 to the church of St. Mangen in St. Gallen. The stewards (Truchsessen) of Singenberg held the advocacy (Vogtei) as a fief until around 1250. From the 15th century until 1798 the abbot of St. Gallen held the low court, the appellate jurisdiction and the right to raise troops (Mannschaftsrecht) in the criminal court district (Malefizgericht) of Sitterdorf.

The church of St. Martin, mentioned from 1215, was rebuilt in 1515 and renovated in 1964. The advowson (Kollatur) passed to the Ryff family in 1419, to the von Hallwyl family in 1570 and to the Abbey of Saint Gall in 1734. After the Reformation of 1528 the Mass was reintroduced in 1567, and the church was used by both denominations as a shared church until 1961.

Sitterdorf grew grain under the three-field system, and mills are mentioned from 1277. From the 19th century livestock and dairy farming (with cheese dairies), fruit growing and market gardening were practiced. Work was provided by local trades and businesses, among them papermaking at Degenau, embroidery works and, from 1920 to 1934, a shoe factory. Sitterdorf has had an airfield since 1963.

From 1803 to 1996 Sitterdorf was an Ortsgemeinde of the Munizipalgemeinde (municipal commune) of Zihlschlacht; in 1997 it became part of the municipality of Zihlschlacht-Sitterdorf. Sitterdorf had 582 inhabitants in 1831, 695 in 1850, 738 in 1900, 850 in 1950 and 982 in 1990.

== Bibliography ==
- Die Kunstdenkmäler des Kantons Thurgau, 3, 1962, 491–509
- P. Etter, Von Sidrona nach Sitrundorf und die Herren von Singenberg, 1987
