= Kradolf-Schönenberg =

- Municipality
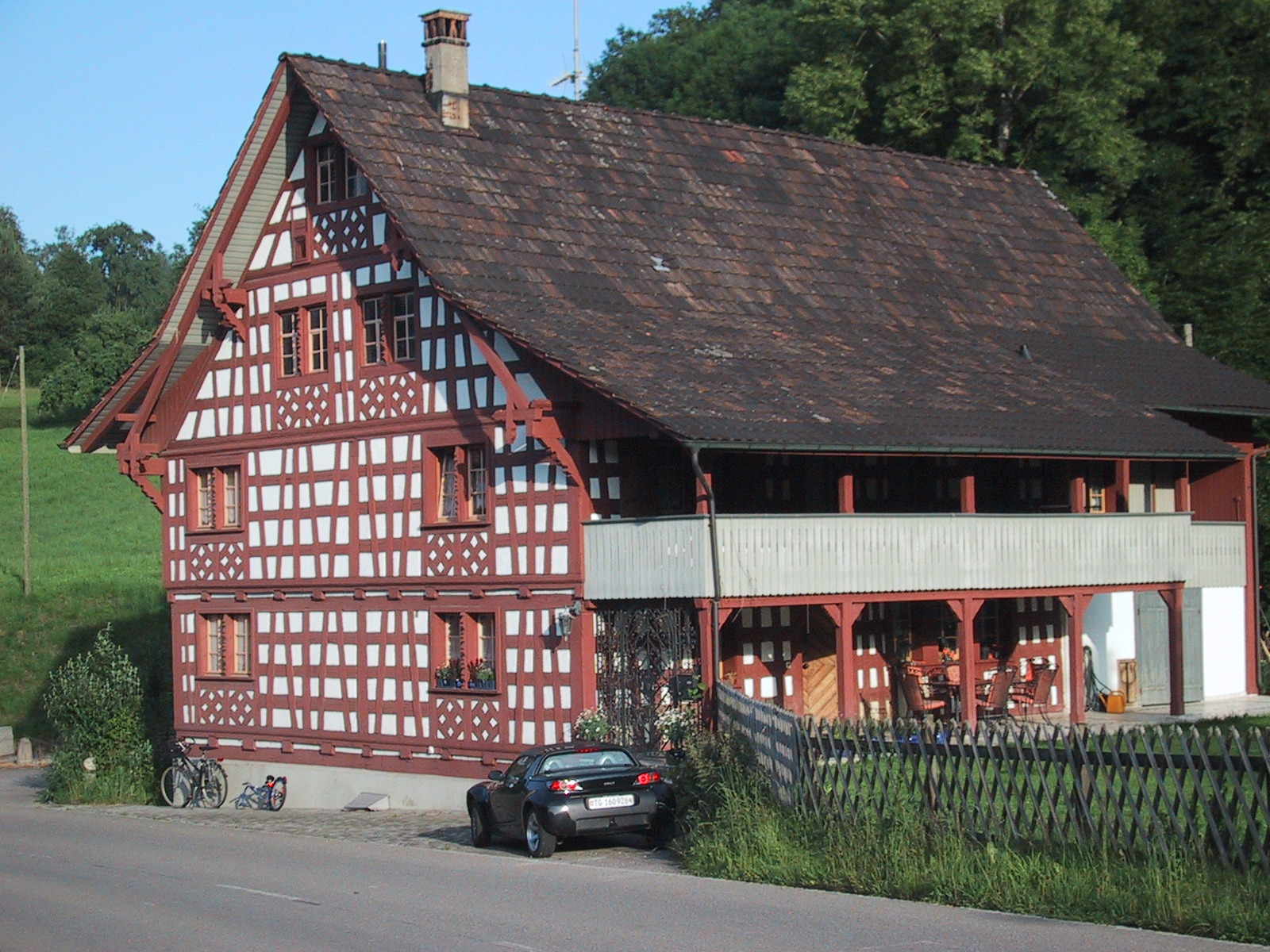
- House in Buhwil village

- Coat of arms
- Location of Kradolf-Schönenberg
- Location within Switzerland Location within Canton of Thurgau
- Coordinates: 47°31′N 9°11′E
- Country: Switzerland
- Canton: Thurgau
- District: Weinfelden

Area
  - Total: 10.9 km^{2} (4.2 sq mi)
- Elevation: 455 m (1,493 ft)

Population (December 2007)
  - Total: 3,215
  - Density: 295/km^{2} (764/sq mi)
- Time zone: UTC+01:00 (CET)
  - Summer (DST): UTC+02:00 (CEST)
- Postal code: 9214, 9215
- SFOS number: 4501
- ISO 3166 code: CH-TG
- Localities: Buhwil, Kradolf, Neukirch an der Thur, Ober Buhwil, Schönenberg an der Thur, Unterau, Unter Buhwil
- Surrounded by: Bischofszell, Bürglen, Hohentannen, Niederhelfenschwil (SG), Schönholzerswilen, Sulgen, Wuppenau
- Website: www.kradolf-schoenenberg.ch

Kradolf-Schönenberg is a municipality in Weinfelden District in the canton of Thurgau in Switzerland.

The municipality was created in 1996 by a merger of Buhwil, Kradolf, Neukirch an der Thur and Schönenberg an der Thur.

== History ==
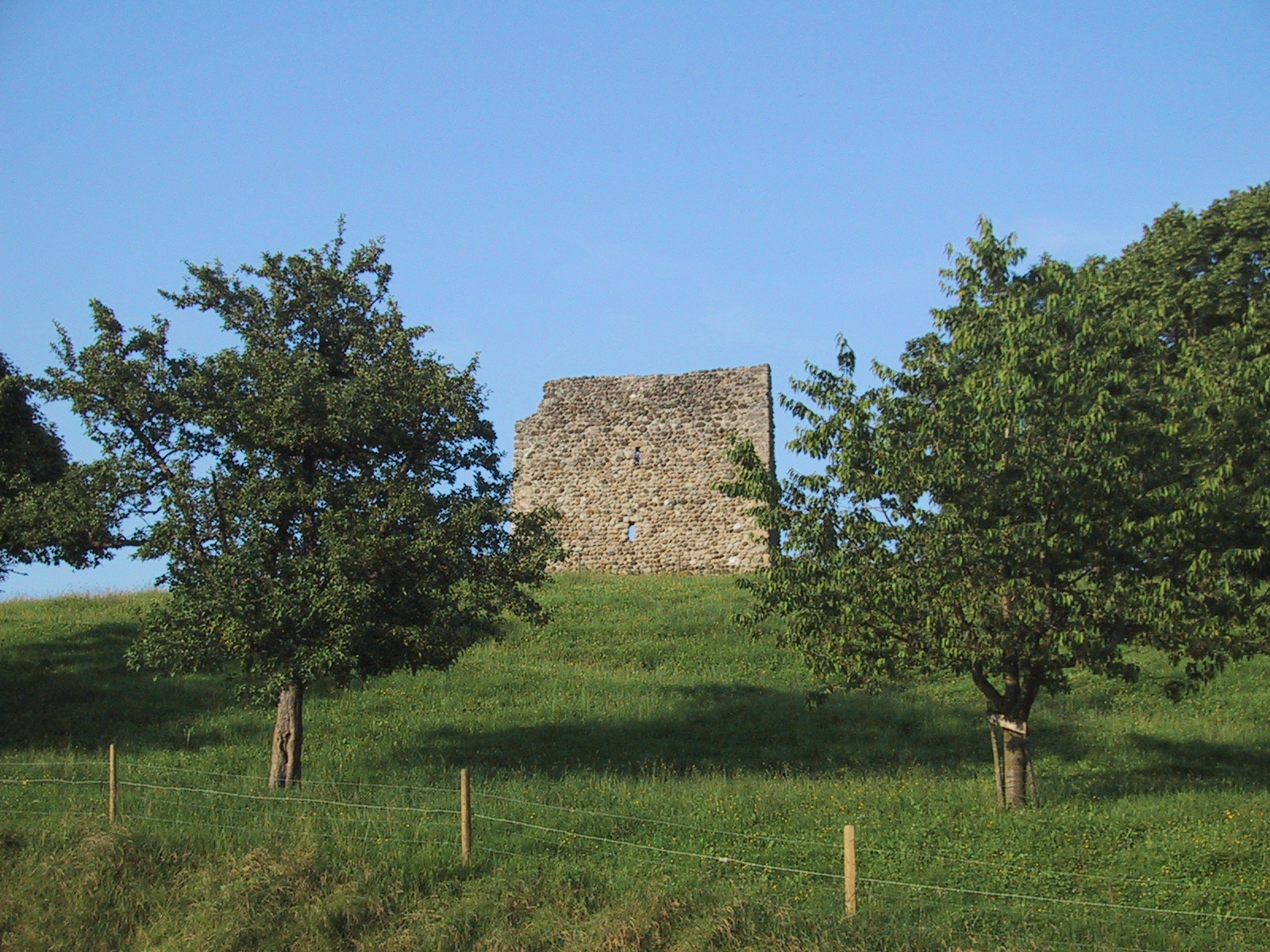
A ruin in Buhwil.

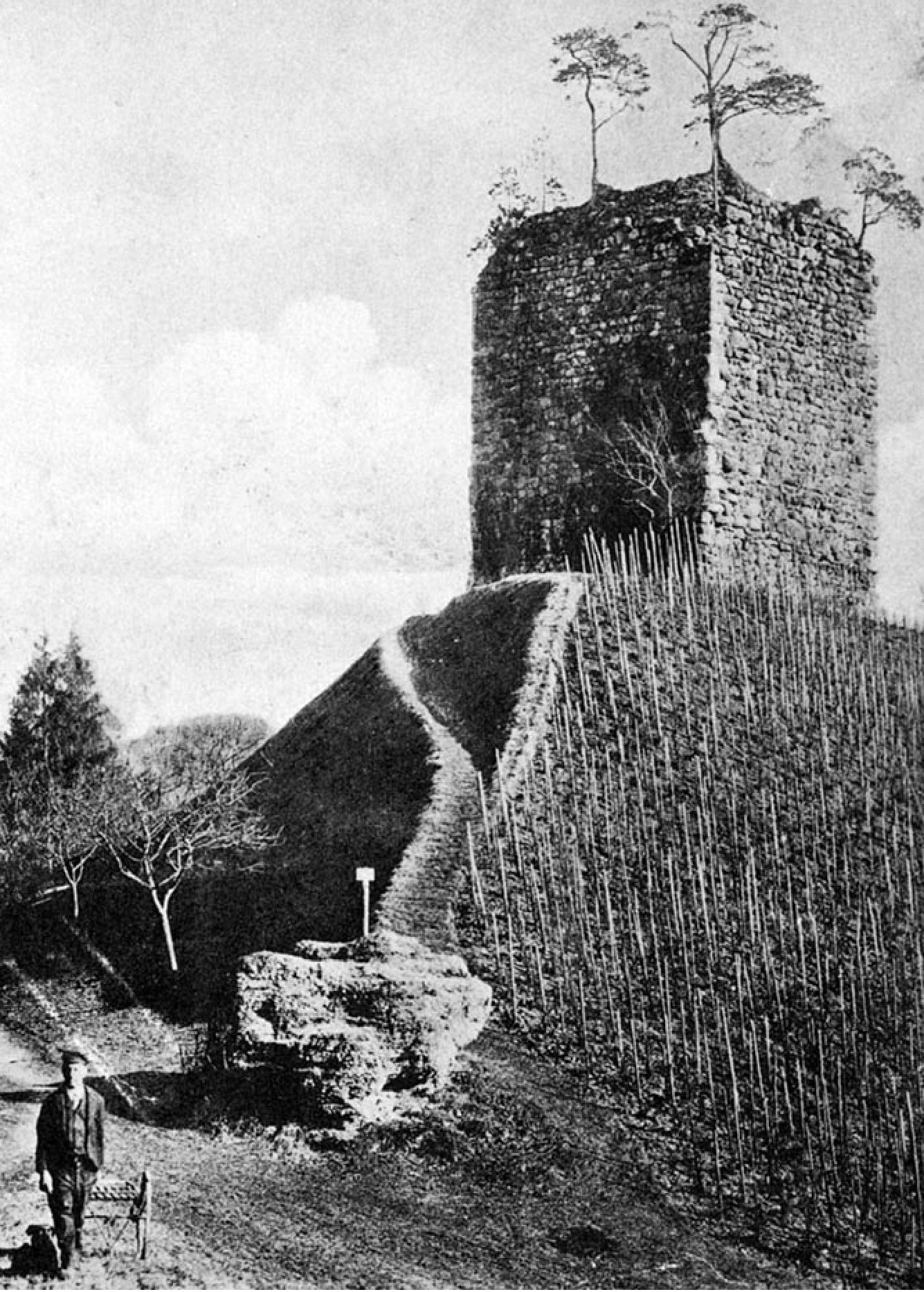
Ruins of Last Castle.

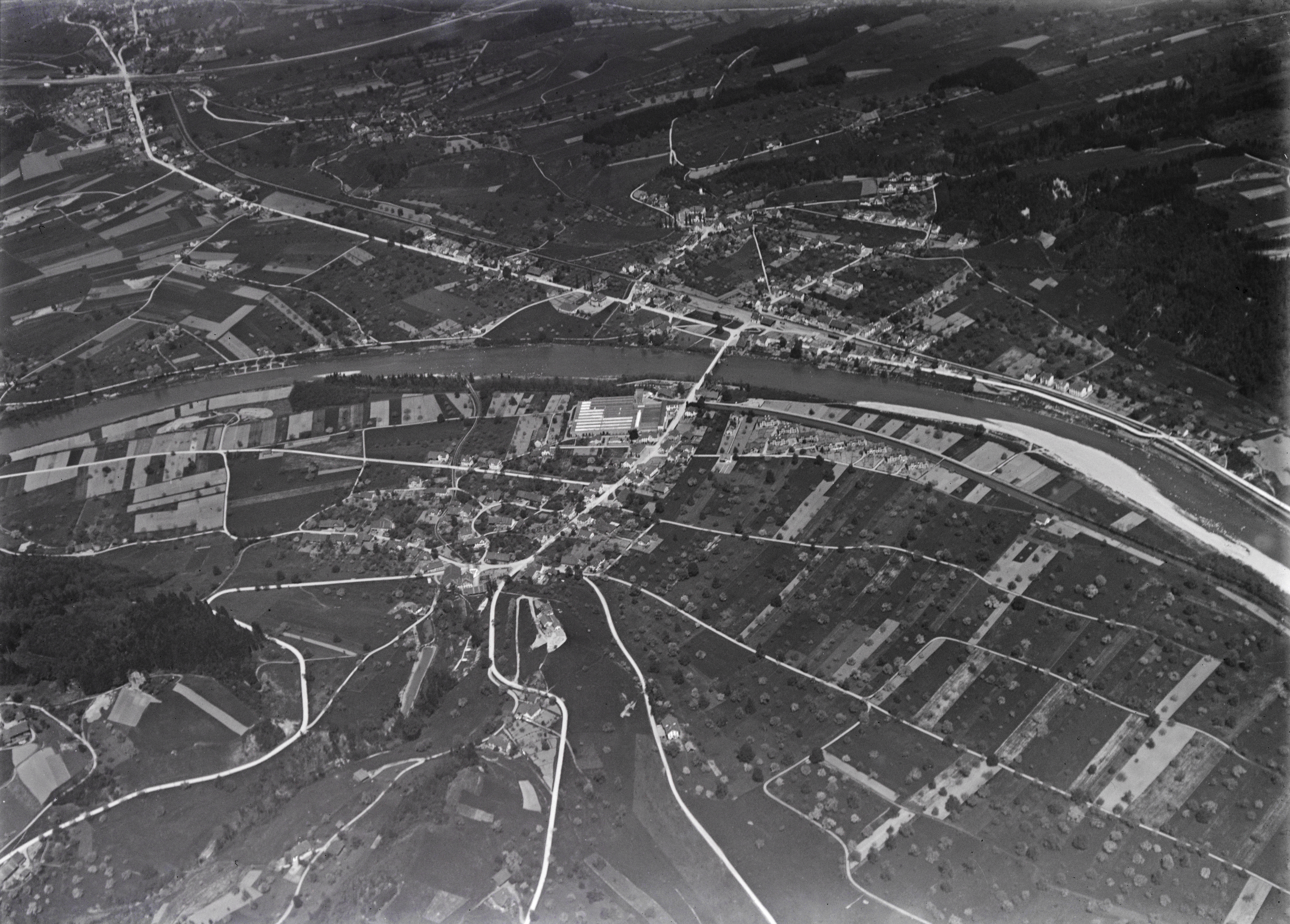
Aerial view from 800 m by Walter Mittelholzer (1919)

Kradolf is first mentioned in 883 as Chreinthorf. In 1276 it was mentioned as Kraedorf. Schönenberg an der Thur is first mentioned in 883 as Thuruftisthorf. In 1359 it was mentioned as Schönnenberg. Neukirch an der Thur is first mentioned in 1291 as Eliswil. In 1296 it was mentioned as Sêliswille, which remained its name until the Protestant Reformation. After 1520 it was known as Nüwenkilchen. Buhwil is first mentioned in 838 as Puabinwilare. In 1276 it was mentioned as Kraedorf.

== Geography ==
Kradolf-Schönenberg has an area, as of 2009, of 10.96 square kilometers (4.23 sq mi). Of this area, 6.75 km^{2} (2.61 sq mi) or 61.6% is used for agricultural purposes, while 2.6 km^{2} (1.0 sq mi) or 23.7% is forested. Of the rest of the land, 1.32 km^{2} (0.51 sq mi) or 12.0% is settled (buildings or roads), 0.25 km^{2} (0.097 sq mi) or 2.3% is either rivers or lakes and 0.02 km^{2} (4.9 acres) or 0.2% is unproductive land.

Of the built up area, industrial buildings made up 6.0% of the total area while housing and buildings made up 1.4% and transportation infrastructure made up 0.3%. while parks, green belts and sports fields made up 3.9%. Out of the forested land, 19.8% of the total land area is heavily forested and 3.9% is covered with orchards or small clusters of trees. Of the agricultural land, 54.6% is used for growing crops, while 7.0% is used for orchards or vine crops. All the water in the municipality is flowing water. Of the unproductive areas, and .

The municipality is located in Weinfelden District. It consists of the linear village of Kradolf, Buhwil, Neukirch an der Thur and Schönenberg an der Thur.

== Demographics ==
Kradolf-Schönenberg has a population (as of December 2020) of 3,677. As of 2008, 19.3% of the population are foreign nationals. Over the last 10 years (1997–2007) the population has changed at a rate of 0.7%. Most of the population (as of 2000) speaks German (87.6%), with Albanian being second most common ( 4.8%) and Italian being third ( 1.9%).

As of 2008, the gender distribution of the population was 51.4% male and 48.6% female. The population was made up of 1,329 Swiss men (40.3% of the population), and 366 (11.1%) non-Swiss men. There were 1,333 Swiss women (40.4%), and 269 (8.2%) non-Swiss women.

In 2008 there were 29 live births to Swiss citizens and 9 births to non-Swiss citizens, and in same time span there were 26 deaths of Swiss citizens and 1 non-Swiss citizen death. Ignoring immigration and emigration, the population of Swiss citizens increased by 3 while the foreign population increased by 8. There were 2 Swiss men who emigrated from Switzerland to another country, 1 Swiss woman who emigrated from Switzerland to another country, 24 non-Swiss men who emigrated from Switzerland to another country and 11 non-Swiss women who emigrated from Switzerland to another country. The total Swiss population change in 2008 (from all sources) was an increase of 32 and the non-Swiss population change was an increase of 41 people. This represents a population growth rate of 2.3%.

The age distribution, as of 2009, in Kradolf-Schönenberg is; 302 children or 9.1% of the population are between 0 and 9 years old and 485 teenagers or 14.7% are between 10 and 19. Of the adult population, 472 people or 14.3% of the population are between 20 and 29 years old. 402 people or 12.2% are between 30 and 39, 606 people or 18.3% are between 40 and 49, and 494 people or 14.9% are between 50 and 59. The senior population distribution is 259 people or 7.8% of the population are between 60 and 69 years old, 174 people or 5.3% are between 70 and 79, there are 96 people or 2.9% who are between 80 and 89, and there are 17 people or 0.5% who are 90 and older.

As of 2000 the average number of residents per living room was 0.58 which is about equal to the cantonal average of 0.56 per room. In this case, a room is defined as space of a housing unit of at least 4 m^{2} (43 sq ft) as normal bedrooms, dining rooms, living rooms, kitchens and habitable cellars and attics. About 43.2% of the total households were owner occupied, or in other words did not pay rent (though they may have a mortgage or a rent-to-own agreement).

As of 2000, there were 1,165 private households in the municipality, and an average of 2.5 persons per household. In 2000 there were 408 single family homes (or 74.6% of the total) out of a total of 547 inhabited buildings. There were 41 two family buildings (7.5%), 53 three family buildings (9.7%) and 45 multi-family buildings (or 8.2%). There were 622 (or 20.3%) persons who were part of a couple without children, and 1,737 (or 56.7%) who were part of a couple with children. There were 210 (or 6.9%) people who lived in single parent home, while there are 20 persons who were adult children living with one or both parents, 14 persons who lived in a household made up of relatives, 18 who lived in a household made up of unrelated persons, and 92 who are either institutionalized or live in another type of collective housing.

The vacancy rate for the municipality, in 2008, was 3.11%. As of 2007, the construction rate of new housing units was 2.2 new units per 1000 residents. In 2000 there were 1,279 apartments in the municipality. The most common apartment size was the 4 room apartment of which there were 338. There were 30 single room apartments and 225 apartments with six or more rooms. As of 2000 the average price to rent an average apartment in Kradolf-Schönenberg was 950.04 Swiss francs (CHF) per month (US$760, £430, €610 approx. exchange rate from 2000). The average rate for a one-room apartment was 712.17 CHF (US$570, £320, €460), a two-room apartment was about 656.95 CHF (US$530, £300, €420), a three-room apartment was about 817.13 CHF (US$650, £370, €520) and a six or more room apartment cost an average of 1365.71 CHF (US$1090, £610, €870). The average apartment price in Kradolf-Schönenberg was 85.1% of the national average of 1116 CHF.

In the 2007 federal election the most popular party was the SVP which received 42.38% of the vote. The next three most popular parties were the SP (16.2%), the FDP (13.36%) and the Green Party (10.58%). In the federal election, a total of 914 votes were cast, and the voter turnout was 44.1%.

The historical population is given in the following table:

Year	Population Kradolf	Population Schönenberg an der Thur	Population Neukirch an der Thur	Population Buhwil
1831		190		
1850	147		2,546	320
1870–1880	228	254		
1900–1910	649	820	1,921	283
1920	1,064			
1950–1960	983	813	1,879	282
1990–1995	1,183	1,249	1,997	287
Year	Population			
2000	3,062			

== Economy ==
As of 2007, Kradolf-Schönenberg had an unemployment rate of 1.73%. As of 2005, there were 142 people employed in the primary economic sector and about 52 businesses involved in this sector. 461 people are employed in the secondary sector and there are 41 businesses in this sector. 431 people are employed in the tertiary sector, with 89 businesses in this sector.

In 2000 there were 2,117 workers who lived in the municipality. Of these, 1,022 or about 48.3% of the residents worked outside Kradolf-Schönenberg while 424 people commuted into the municipality for work. There were a total of 1,519 jobs (of at least 6 hours per week) in the municipality. Of the working population, 8.4% used public transportation to get to work, and 51.1% used a private car.

== Religion ==
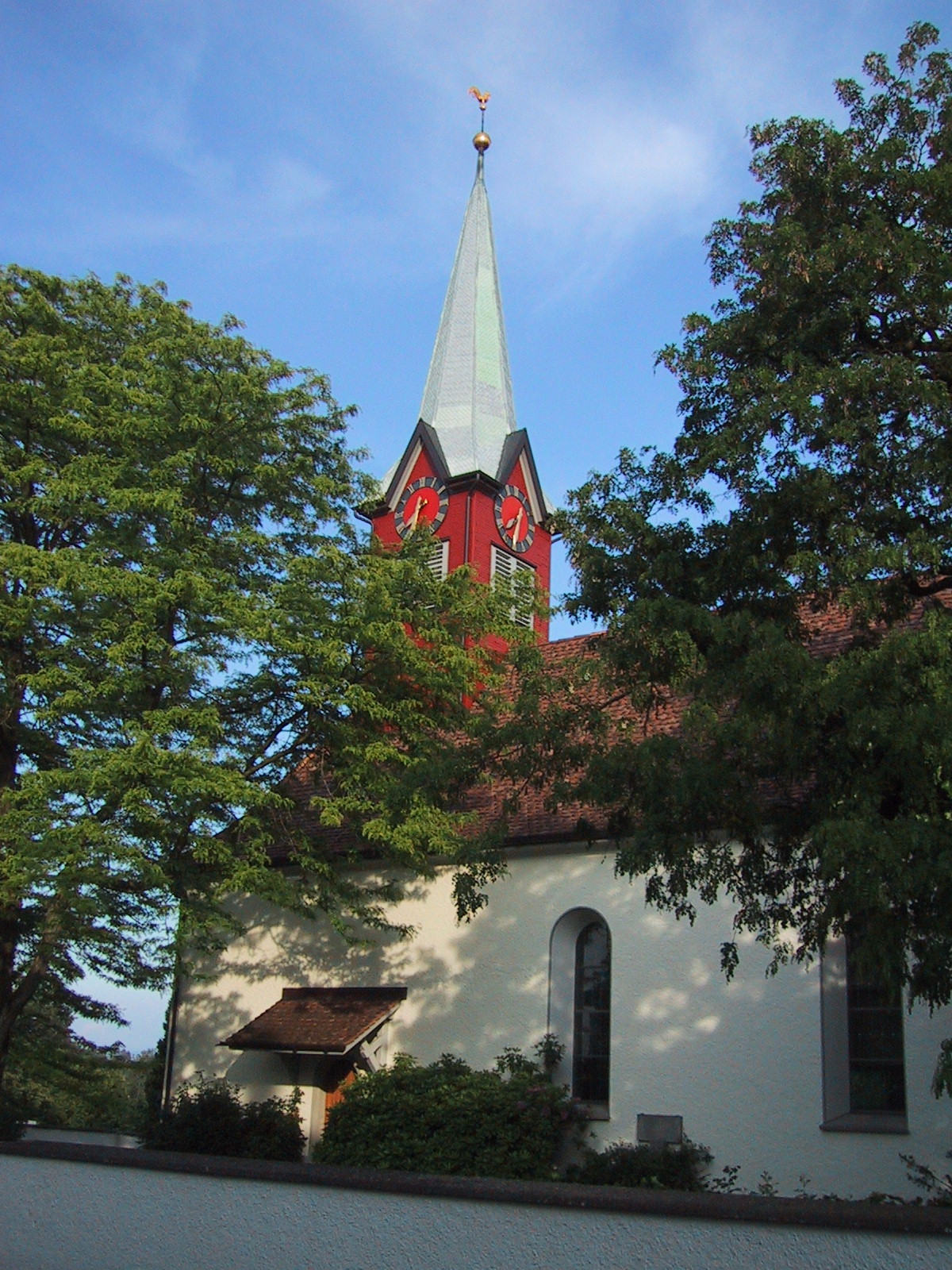
Church in Neukirch

From the 2000 census, 857 or 28.0% were Roman Catholic, while 1,296 or 42.3% belonged to the Swiss Reformed Church. Of the rest of the population, there was 1 Old Catholic who belonged to the Christian Catholic Church of Switzerland there are 37 individuals (or about 1.21% of the population) who belong to the Orthodox Church, and there are 186 individuals (or about 6.07% of the population) who belong to another Christian church. There were 369 (or about 12.05% of the population) who are Islamic. There are 10 individuals (or about 0.33% of the population) who belong to another church (not listed on the census), 196 (or about 6.40% of the population) belong to no church, are agnostic or atheist, and 110 individuals (or about 3.59% of the population) did not answer the question.

== Education ==
The entire Swiss population is generally well educated. In Kradolf-Schönenberg about 64.1% of the population (between age 25-64) have completed either non-mandatory upper secondary education or additional higher education (either university or a Fachhochschule).

Kradolf-Schönenberg is home to the Schönenberg-Kradolf primary school district. In the 2008/2009 school year there are 200 students. There are 42 children in the kindergarten, and the average class size is 21 kindergartners. Of the children in kindergarten, 24 or 57.1% are female, 6 or 14.3% are not Swiss citizens and 5 or 11.9% do not speak German natively. The lower and upper primary levels begin at about age 5-6 and lasts for 6 years. There are 65 children in who are at the lower primary level and 93 children in the upper primary level. The average class size in the primary school is 21 students. At the lower primary level, there are 28 children or 43.1% of the total population who are female, 15 or 23.1% are not Swiss citizens and 16 or 24.6% do not speak German natively. In the upper primary level, there are 49 or 52.7% who are female, 26 or 28.0% are not Swiss citizens and 23 or 24.7% do not speak German natively.

== See also ==
- Kradolf railway station
