= Zihlschlacht-Sitterdorf =

- Municipality
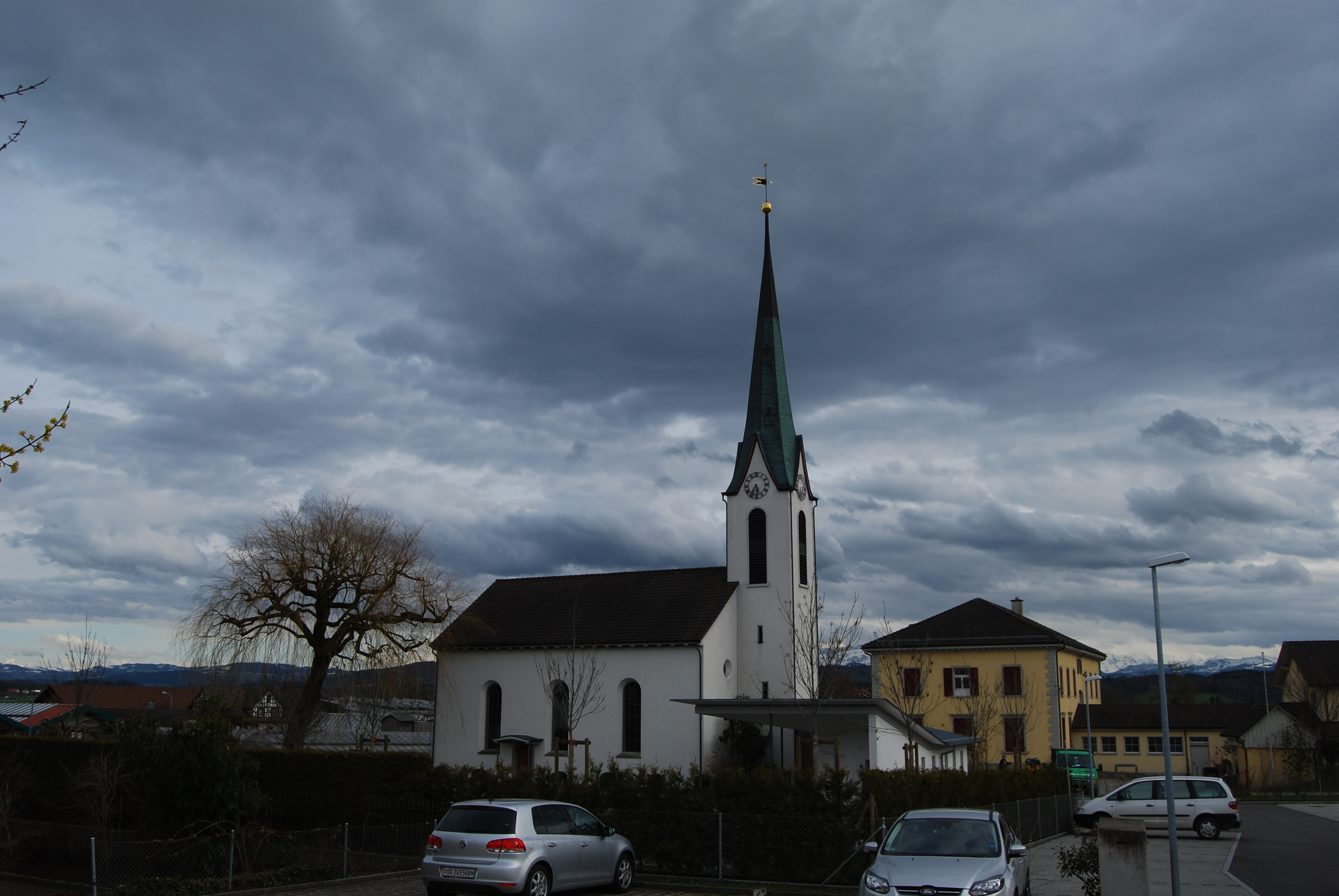

- Coat of arms
- Location of Zihlschlacht-Sitterdorf
- Location within Switzerland Location within Canton of Thurgau
- Coordinates: 47°31′N 9°16′E
- Country: Switzerland
- Canton: Thurgau
- District: Weinfelden

Area
  - Total: 12.2 km^{2} (4.7 sq mi)
- Elevation: 527 m (1,729 ft)

Population (December 2007)
  - Total: 2,029
  - Density: 166/km^{2} (431/sq mi)
- Time zone: UTC+01:00 (CET)
  - Summer (DST): UTC+02:00 (CEST)
- Postal code: 8588
- SFOS number: 4511
- ISO 3166 code: CH-TG
- Surrounded by: Amriswil, Bischofszell, Erlen, Hauptwil-Gottshaus, Hohentannen, Muolen (SG)
- Website: www.zihlschlacht-sitterdorf.ch

Zihlschlacht-Sitterdorf is a municipality in Weinfelden District in the canton of Thurgau in Switzerland.

== Geography ==
Zihlschlacht-Sitterdorf has an area, as of 2009, of 12.2 square kilometers (4.7 sq mi). Of this area, 8.98 km^{2} (3.47 sq mi) or 73.6% is used for agricultural purposes, while 1.94 km^{2} (0.75 sq mi) or 15.9% is forested. Of the rest of the land, 1.12 km^{2} (0.43 sq mi) or 9.2% is settled (buildings or roads), 0.14 km^{2} (35 acres) or 1.1% is either rivers or lakes and 0.01 km^{2} (2.5 acres) or 0.1% is unproductive land.

Of the built up area, industrial buildings made up 4.4% of the total area while housing and buildings made up 0.5% and transportation infrastructure made up 0.2%. while parks, green belts and sports fields made up 3.2%. Out of the forested land, 13.6% of the total land area is heavily forested and 2.3% is covered with orchards or small clusters of trees. Of the agricultural land, 60.9% is used for growing crops, while 12.7% is used for orchards or vine crops. All the water in the municipality is flowing water.

Zihlschlacht-Sitterdorf was formed in 1997 through the merger of Zihlschlacht with Sitterdorf.

== Demographics ==
Zihlschlacht-Sitterdorf has a population (as of December 2020) of 2,483. As of 2008, 10.5% of the population are foreign nationals. Over the last 10 years (1997–2007) the population has changed at a rate of 4.9%. Most of the population (as of 2000) speaks German (92.7%), with Albanian being second most common ( 1.6%) and Portuguese being third ( 1.5%).

As of 2008, the gender distribution of the population was 52.5% male and 47.5% female. The population was made up of 962 Swiss men (46.9% of the population), and 115 (5.6%) non-Swiss men. There were 874 Swiss women (42.6%), and 100 (4.9%) non-Swiss women.

In 2008 there were 15 live births to Swiss citizens and births to non-Swiss citizens, and in same time span there were 18 deaths of Swiss citizens. Ignoring immigration and emigration, the population of Swiss citizens decreased by 3 while the foreign population remained the same. There was 1 Swiss man, 1 Swiss woman who emigrated from Switzerland to another country, 13 non-Swiss men who emigrated from Switzerland to another country and 5 non-Swiss women who emigrated from Switzerland to another country. The total Swiss population change in 2008 (from all sources) was an increase of 8 and the non-Swiss population change was an increase of 8 people. This represents a population growth rate of 0.8%.

The age distribution, as of 2009, in Zihlschlacht-Sitterdorf is; 207 children or 10.1% of the population are between 0 and 9 years old and 319 teenagers or 15.6% are between 10 and 19. Of the adult population, 265 people or 13.0% of the population are between 20 and 29 years old. 247 people or 12.1% are between 30 and 39, 351 people or 17.2% are between 40 and 49, and 277 people or 13.6% are between 50 and 59. The senior population distribution is 191 people or 9.4% of the population are between 60 and 69 years old, 112 people or 5.5% are between 70 and 79, there are 65 people or 3.2% who are between 80 and 89, and there are 8 people or 0.4% who are 90 and older.

As of 2000, there were 708 private households in the municipality, and an average of 2.7 persons per household. In 2000 there were 348 single family homes (or 84.3% of the total) out of a total of 413 inhabited buildings. There were 28 two family buildings (6.8%), 16 three family buildings (3.9%) and 21 multi-family buildings (or 5.1%). There were 392 (or 20.2%) persons who were part of a couple without children, and 1,189 (or 61.2%) who were part of a couple with children. There were 100 (or 5.1%) people who lived in single parent home, while there are 14 persons who were adult children living with one or both parents, 4 persons who lived in a household made up of relatives, 19 who lived in a household made up of unrelated persons, and 40 who are either institutionalized or live in another type of collective housing.

The vacancy rate for the municipality, in 2008, was 0.83%. As of 2007, the construction rate of new housing units was 4.9 new units per 1000 residents. In 2000 there were 793 apartments in the municipality. The most common apartment size was the 6 room apartment of which there were 201. There were 20 single room apartments and 201 apartments with six or more rooms. As of 2000 the average price to rent an average apartment in Zihlschlacht-Sitterdorf was 991.74 Swiss francs (CHF) per month (US$790, £450, €630 approx. exchange rate from 2000). The average rate for a one-room apartment was 489.44 CHF (US$390, £220, €310), a two-room apartment was about 697.81 CHF (US$560, £310, €450), a three-room apartment was about 814.07 CHF (US$650, £370, €520) and a six or more room apartment cost an average of 1591.38 CHF (US$1270, £720, €1020). The average apartment price in Zihlschlacht-Sitterdorf was 88.9% of the national average of 1116 CHF.

In the 2007 federal election the most popular party was the SVP which received 51.13% of the vote. The next three most popular parties were the CVP (12.65%), the EDU Party (10.12%) and the FDP (8.77%). In the federal election, a total of 648 votes were cast, and the voter turnout was 46.1%.

The historical population is given in the following table:

year	population
1950	1,468
1960	1,462
1980	1,405
1990	1,727
2000	1,942

== Heritage sites of national significance ==
The Gardens of Bildegg Castle and the Chapel of St Nikolaus and St Magdalena are listed as Swiss heritage site of national significance. The entire village of Zihlschlacht and the Blidegg – Degenau region are listed as part of the Inventory of Swiss Heritage Sites.

== Economy ==
As of 2007, Zihlschlacht-Sitterdorf had an unemployment rate of 1.59%. As of 2005, there were 134 people employed in the primary economic sector and about 48 businesses involved in this sector. 295 people are employed in the secondary sector and there are 34 businesses in this sector. 524 people are employed in the tertiary sector, with 47 businesses in this sector.

In 2000 there were 1,357 workers who lived in the municipality. Of these, 617 or about 45.5% of the residents worked outside Zihlschlacht-Sitterdorf while 508 people commuted into the municipality for work. There were a total of 1,248 jobs (of at least 6 hours per week) in the municipality. Of the working population, 7% used public transportation to get to work, and 47.9% used a private car.

== Religion ==
From the 2000 census, 638 or 32.9% were Roman Catholic, while 898 or 46.2% belonged to the Swiss Reformed Church. Of the rest of the population, there were 2 Old Catholics (or about 0.10% of the population) who belonged to the Christian Catholic Church of Switzerland there are 18 individuals (or about 0.93% of the population) who belong to the Orthodox Church, and there are 110 individuals (or about 5.66% of the population) who belong to another Christian church. There were 78 (or about 4.02% of the population) who are Islamic. There are 2 individuals (or about 0.10% of the population) who belong to another church (not listed on the census), 118 (or about 6.08% of the population) belong to no church, are agnostic or atheist, and 78 individuals (or about 4.02% of the population) did not answer the question.

== Education ==
In Zihlschlacht-Sitterdorf about 71% of the population (between age 25–64) have completed either non-mandatory upper secondary education or additional higher education (either university or a Fachhochschule).

== Trivia ==
The Swiss sitcom Fascht e Familie (1994–1999) was produced in Sitterdorf.

== See also ==
- Sitterdorf railway station
