= Bischofszell District =

Coordinates: 47°30′N 9°14′E

Bischofszell District Bezirk Bischofszell
- District
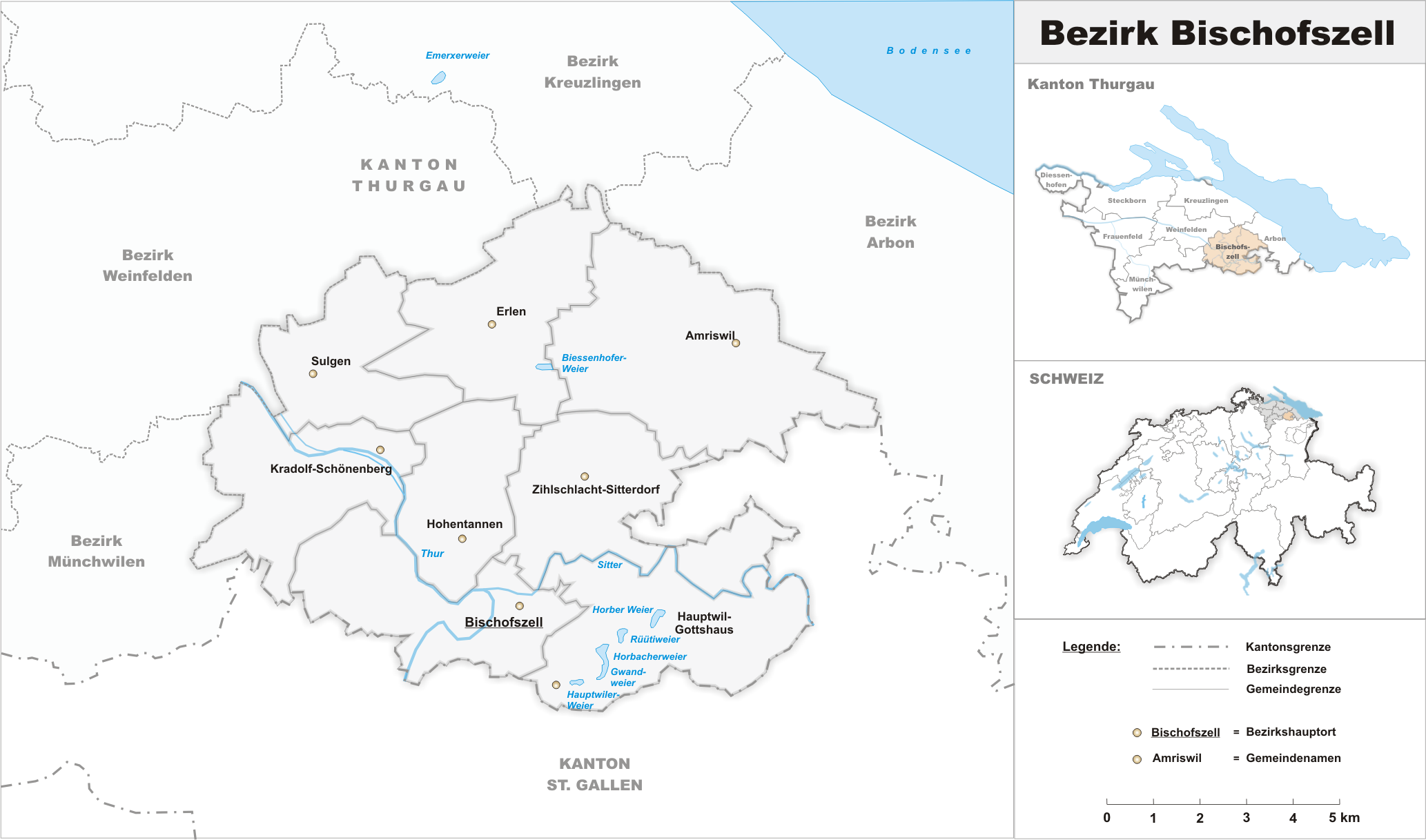
- Country: Switzerland
- Canton: Thurgau
- Capital: Bischofszell

Area
  - Total: 95.7 km^{2} (36.9 sq mi)

Population (2009)
  - Total: 31,773
  - Density: 332/km^{2} (860/sq mi)
- Time zone: UTC+1 (CET)
  - Summer (DST): UTC+2 (CEST)
- Municipalities: 8

Bischofszell District is a former district of the canton of Thurgau in Switzerland. It had a population of 31,773 (as of 2009). Its capital was the town of Bischofszell.

The district contained the following municipalities:

Coat of arms	Municipality	Population (31 December 2020)	Area km^{2}
Amriswil	Amriswil	14,211	19.02
Bischofszell	Bischofszell	5,907	11.62
Erlen	Erlen	3,802	12.19
Hauptwil-Gottshaus	Hauptwil-Gottshaus	2,017	12.49
Hohentannen	Hohentannen	612	8.00
Kradolf-Schönenberg	Kradolf-Schönenberg	3,677	10.96
Sulgen	Sulgen	3,957	9.13
Zihlschlacht-Sitterdorf	Zihlschlacht-Sitterdorf	2,483	12.20
	Total	31,773	95.7
