= Kradolf =

Coordinates: 47°32′N 9°12′E

Kradolf is a village and former municipality in the canton of Thurgau, Switzerland.

It was first recorded in year 883 as Chreinthorf.

The municipality had 147 inhabitants in 1850, which increased to 228 in 1880, 649 in 1900 and 1,064 in 1920. It then dropped to 983 in 1950 before increasing again, to 1,183 in 1990.

In 1996 the municipality was merged with the other, neighboring municipalities Buhwil, Neukirch an der Thur and Schönenberg an der Thur to form a new and larger municipality Kradolf-Schönenberg.
