= Sulgen =

- Municipality
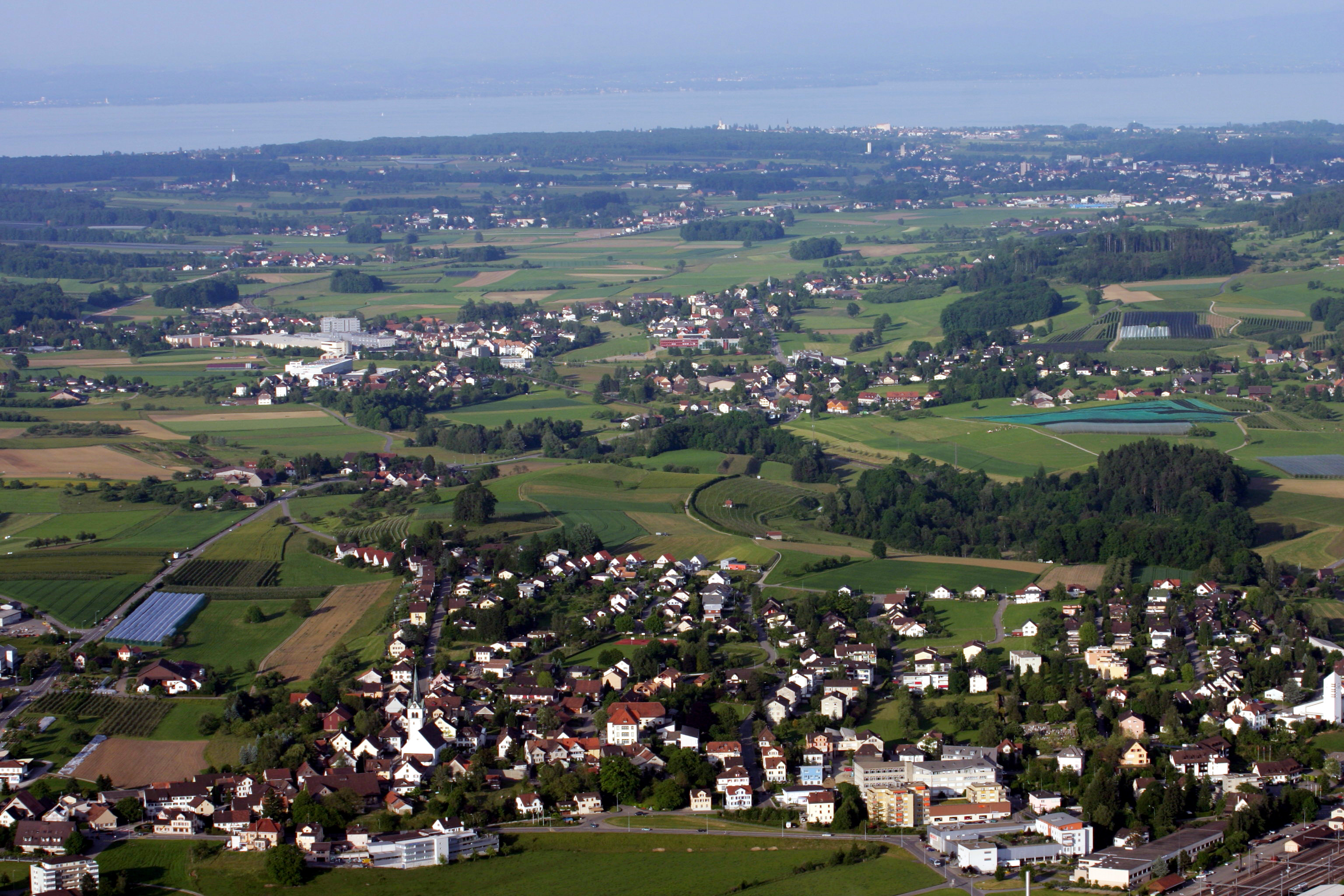
- Sulgen village

- Coat of arms
- Location of Sulgen
- Location within Switzerland Location within Canton of Thurgau
- Coordinates: 47°32′N 9°11′E
- Country: Switzerland
- Canton: Thurgau
- District: Weinfelden

Area
  - Total: 9.13 km^{2} (3.53 sq mi)
- Elevation: 460 m (1,510 ft)

Population (December 2007)
  - Total: 3,366
  - Density: 369/km^{2} (955/sq mi)
- Time zone: UTC+01:00 (CET)
  - Summer (DST): UTC+02:00 (CEST)
- Postal code: 8583
- SFOS number: 4506
- ISO 3166 code: CH-TG
- Surrounded by: Birwinken, Bürglen, Erlen, Hohentannen, Kradolf-Schönenberg
- Website: www.sulgen.ch

Sulgen is a municipality in Weinfelden District in the canton of Thurgau in Switzerland.

== Geography ==
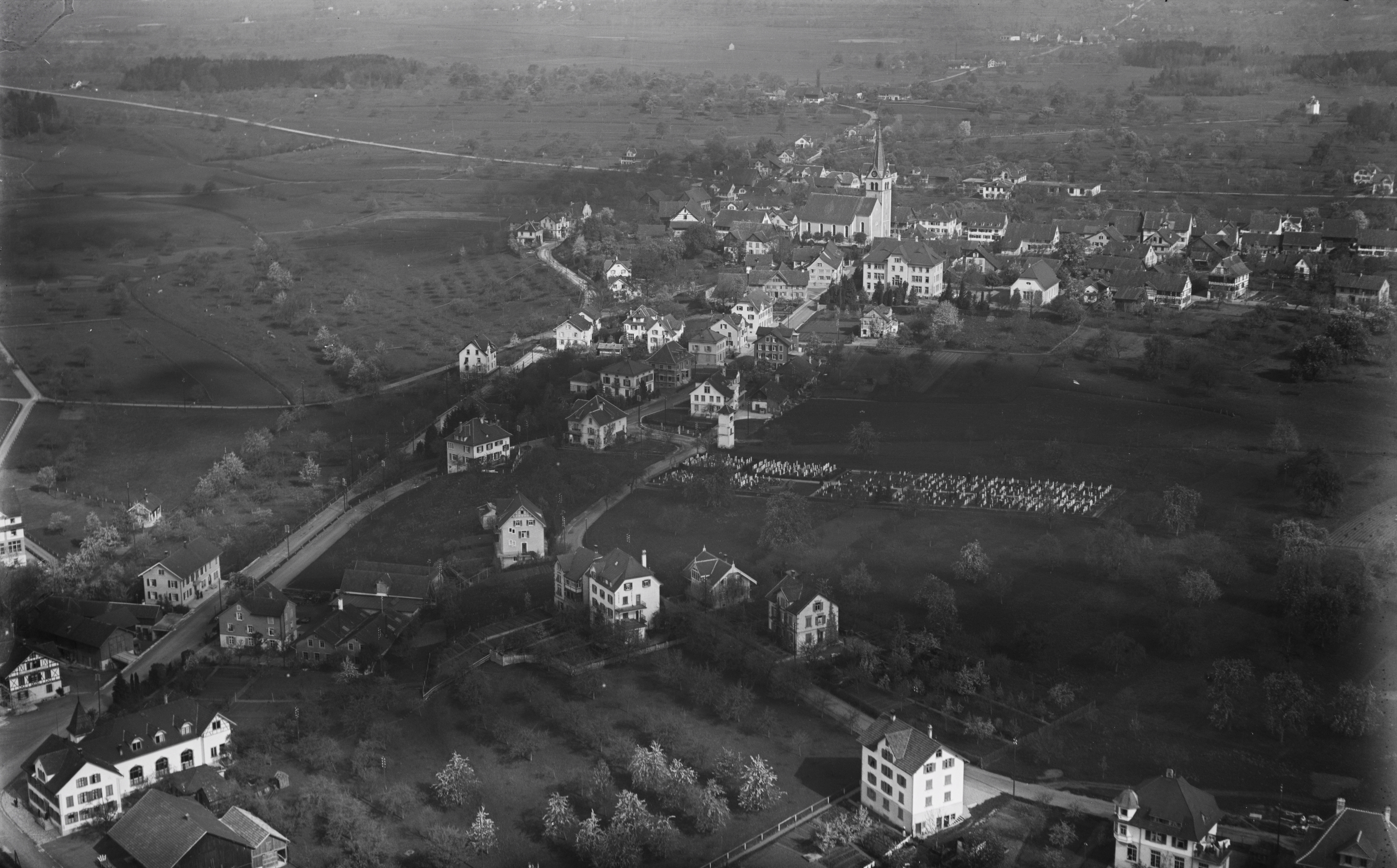
Aerial view from 300 m by Walter Mittelholzer (1923)

Sulgen has an area, as of 2009, of 9.13 square kilometers (3.53 sq mi). Of this area, 6.12 km^{2} (2.36 sq mi) or 67.0% is used for agricultural purposes, while 1.18 km^{2} (0.46 sq mi) or 12.9% is forested. Of the rest of the land, 1.7 km^{2} (0.66 sq mi) or 18.6% is settled (buildings or roads), 0.03 km^{2} (7.4 acres) or 0.3% is either rivers or lakes and 0.07 km^{2} (17 acres) or 0.8% is unproductive land.

Of the built up area, industrial buildings made up 10.1% of the total area while housing and buildings made up 2.5% and transportation infrastructure made up 0.4%. while parks, green belts and sports fields made up 4.9%. Out of the forested land, all of the forested land area is covered with heavy forests. Of the agricultural land, 53.2% is used for growing crops, while 13.8% is used for orchards or vine crops. All the water in the municipality is flowing water.

In 1996 the municipalities of Götighofen and Hessenreuti merged into Sulgen.

== Demographics ==
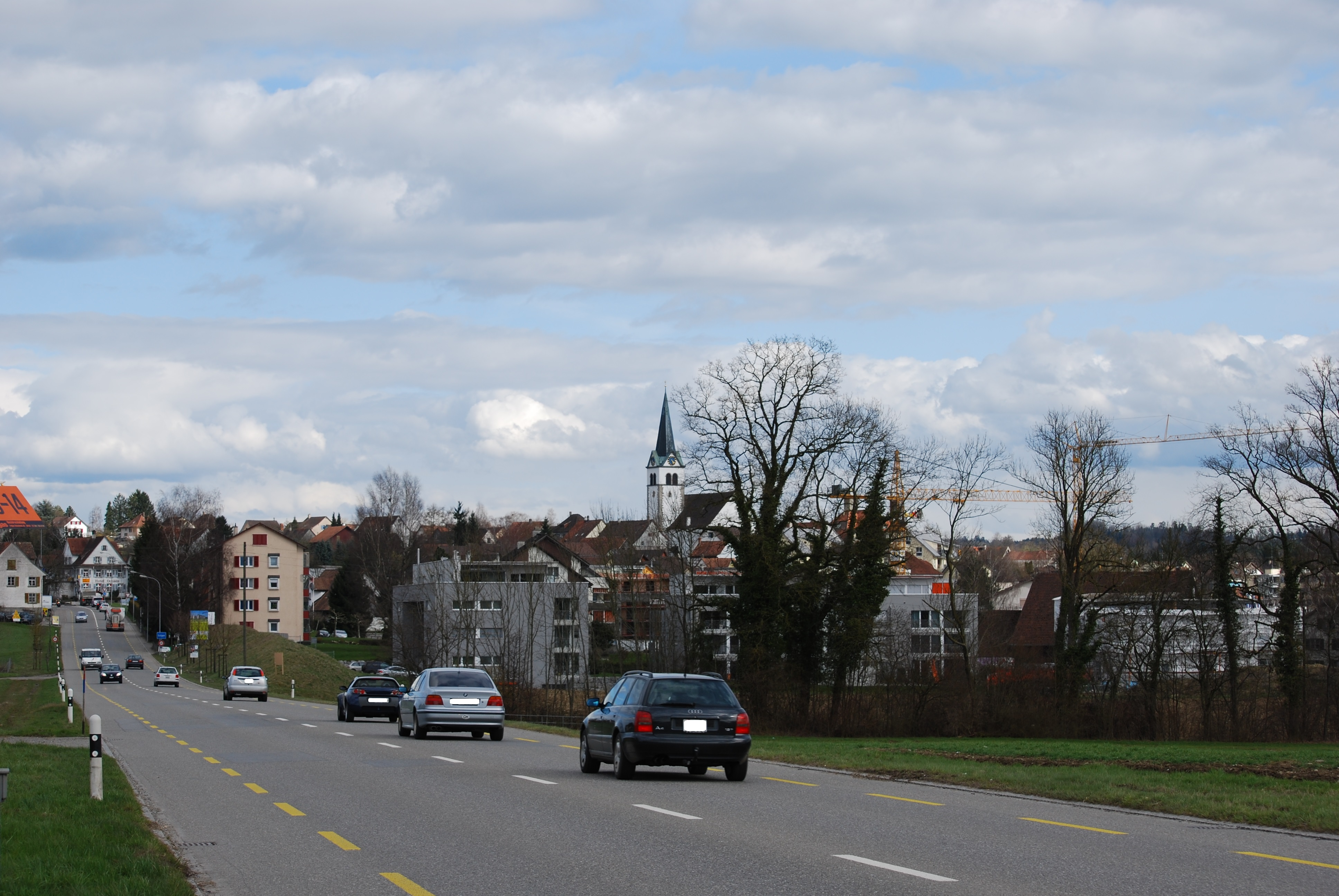
Sulgen

Sulgen has a population (as of December 2020) of 3,957. As of 2008, 21.5% of the population are foreign nationals. Over the last 10 years (1997–2007) the population has changed at a rate of 2.2%. Most of the population (as of 2000) speaks German (88.3%), with Albanian being second most common ( 5.6%) and Italian being third (1.7%).

As of 2008, the gender distribution of the population was 49.3% male and 50.7% female. The population was made up of 1,310 Swiss men (38.4% of the population), and 373 (10.9%) non-Swiss men. There were 1,369 Swiss women (40.1%), and 359 (10.5%) non-Swiss women.

In 2008 there were 19 live births to Swiss citizens and 9 births to non-Swiss citizens, and in same time span there were 19 deaths of Swiss citizens and 1 non-Swiss citizen death. Ignoring immigration and emigration, the population of Swiss citizens remained the same while the foreign population increased by 8. There was 1 Swiss man, 1 Swiss woman who emigrated from Switzerland to another country, 16 non-Swiss men who emigrated from Switzerland to another country and 11 non-Swiss women who emigrated from Switzerland to another country. The total Swiss population change in 2008 (from all sources) was a decrease of 3 and the non-Swiss population change was an increase of 46 people. This represents a population growth rate of 1.3%.

The age distribution, as of 2009, in Sulgen is; 339 children or 9.9% of the population are between 0 and 9 years old and 466 teenagers or 13.6% are between 10 and 19. Of the adult population, 495 people or 14.5% of the population are between 20 and 29 years old. 380 people or 11.1% are between 30 and 39, 578 people or 16.9% are between 40 and 49, and 448 people or 13.1% are between 50 and 59. The senior population distribution is 317 people or 9.3% of the population are between 60 and 69 years old, 215 people or 6.3% are between 70 and 79, there are 148 people or 4.3% who are between 80 and 89, and there are 34 people or 1.0% who are 90 and older.

As of 2000, there were 1,273 private households in the municipality, and an average of 2.6 persons per household. In 2000 there were 472 single family homes (or 78.4% of the total) out of a total of 602 inhabited buildings. There were 54 two family buildings (9.0%), 18 three family buildings (3.0%) and 58 multi-family buildings (or 9.6%). There were 705 (or 20.6%) persons who were part of a couple without children, and 2,030 (or 59.3%) who were part of a couple with children. There were 179 (or 5.2%) people who lived in single parent home, while there are 21 persons who were adult children living with one or both parents, 10 persons who lived in a household made up of relatives, 32 who lived in a household made up of unrelated persons, and 82 who are either institutionalized or live in another type of collective housing.

The vacancy rate for the municipality, in 2008, was 1.29%. As of 2007, the construction rate of new housing units was 1.2 new units per 1000 residents. In 2000 there were 1,445 apartments in the municipality. The most common apartment size was the 4 room apartment of which there were 411. There were 27 single room apartments and 290 apartments with six or more rooms. As of 2000 the average price to rent an average apartment in Sulgen was 933.73 Swiss francs (CHF) per month (US$750, £420, €600 approx. exchange rate from 2000). The average rate for a one-room apartment was 513.13 CHF (US$410, £230, €330), a two-room apartment was about 664.98 CHF (US$530, £300, €430), a three-room apartment was about 771.34 CHF (US$620, £350, €490) and a six or more room apartment cost an average of 1486.21 CHF (US$1190, £670, €950). The average apartment price in Sulgen was 83.7% of the national average of 1116 CHF.

In the 2007 federal election the most popular party was the SVP which received 39.47% of the vote. The next three most popular parties were the FDP (15.55%), the CVP (14.47%) and the SP (11.39%). In the federal election, a total of 1,094 votes were cast, and the voter turnout was 51.1%.

The historical population is given in the following table:

year	population
1950	2,023
1960	2,066
1980	2,409
1990	3,036
2000	3,422

== Economy ==
As of 2007, Sulgen had an unemployment rate of 2.13%. As of 2005, there were 121 people employed in the primary economic sector and about 43 businesses involved in this sector. 869 people are employed in the secondary sector and there are 56 businesses in this sector. 650 people are employed in the tertiary sector, with 111 businesses in this sector.

In 2000 there were 2,341 workers who lived in the municipality. Of these, 1,093 or about 46.7% of the residents worked outside Sulgen while 1,021 people commuted into the municipality for work. There were a total of 2,269 jobs (of at least 6 hours per week) in the municipality. Of the working population, 11.2% used public transportation to get to work, and 49.7% used a private car.

== Religion ==
From the 2000 census, 1,094 or 32.0% were Roman Catholic, while 1,463 or 42.8% belonged to the Swiss Reformed Church. Of the rest of the population, there were 2 Old Catholics (or about 0.06% of the population) who belonged to the Christian Catholic Church of Switzerland there are 31 individuals (or about 0.91% of the population) who belong to the Orthodox Church, and there are 202 individuals (or about 5.90% of the population) who belong to another Christian church. There were 285 (or about 8.33% of the population) who are Islamic. There are 19 individuals (or about 0.56% of the population) who belong to another church (not listed on the census), 211 (or about 6.17% of the population) belong to no church, are agnostic or atheist, and 115 individuals (or about 3.36% of the population) did not answer the question.

== Education ==
The entire Swiss population is generally well educated. In Sulgen about 69.2% of the population (between age 25-64) have completed either non-mandatory upper secondary education or additional higher education (either university or a Fachhochschule).

Sulgen is home to the Sulgen primary school district. It is also home to the Sulgen secondary school district. In the 2008/2009 school year there are 316 students in the primary school district. There are 75 children in the kindergarten, and the average class size is 18.75 kindergartners. Of the children in kindergarten, 39 or 52.0% are female, 30 or 40.0% are not Swiss citizens and 37 or 49.3% do not speak German natively. The lower and upper primary levels begin at about age 5-6 and lasts for 6 years. There are 115 children in who are at the lower primary level and 126 children in the upper primary level. The average class size in the primary school is 18.58 students. At the lower primary level, there are 62 children or 53.9% of the total population who are female, 41 or 35.7% are not Swiss citizens and 45 or 39.1% do not speak German natively. In the upper primary level, there are 57 or 45.2% who are female, 31 or 24.6% are not Swiss citizens and 41 or 32.5% do not speak German natively.

In the secondary school district there are 261 students. At the secondary level, students are divided according to performance. The secondary level begins at about age 12 and usually lasts 3 years. There are 121 teenagers who are in the advanced school, of which 59 or 48.8% are female, 17 or 14.0% are not Swiss citizens and 21 or 17.4% do not speak German natively. There are 131 teenagers who are in the standard school, of which 65 or 49.6% are female, 35 or 26.7% are not Swiss citizens and 35 or 26.7% do not speak German natively. Finally, there are 9 teenagers who are in special or remedial classes, of which 4 or 44.4% are female, 6 or 66.7% are not Swiss citizens and 6 or 66.7% do not speak German natively. The average class size for all classes at the secondary level is 21 students.

== See also ==
- Sulgen railway station
