= Friedrich Hölderlin =

German poet and philosopher (1770–1843)

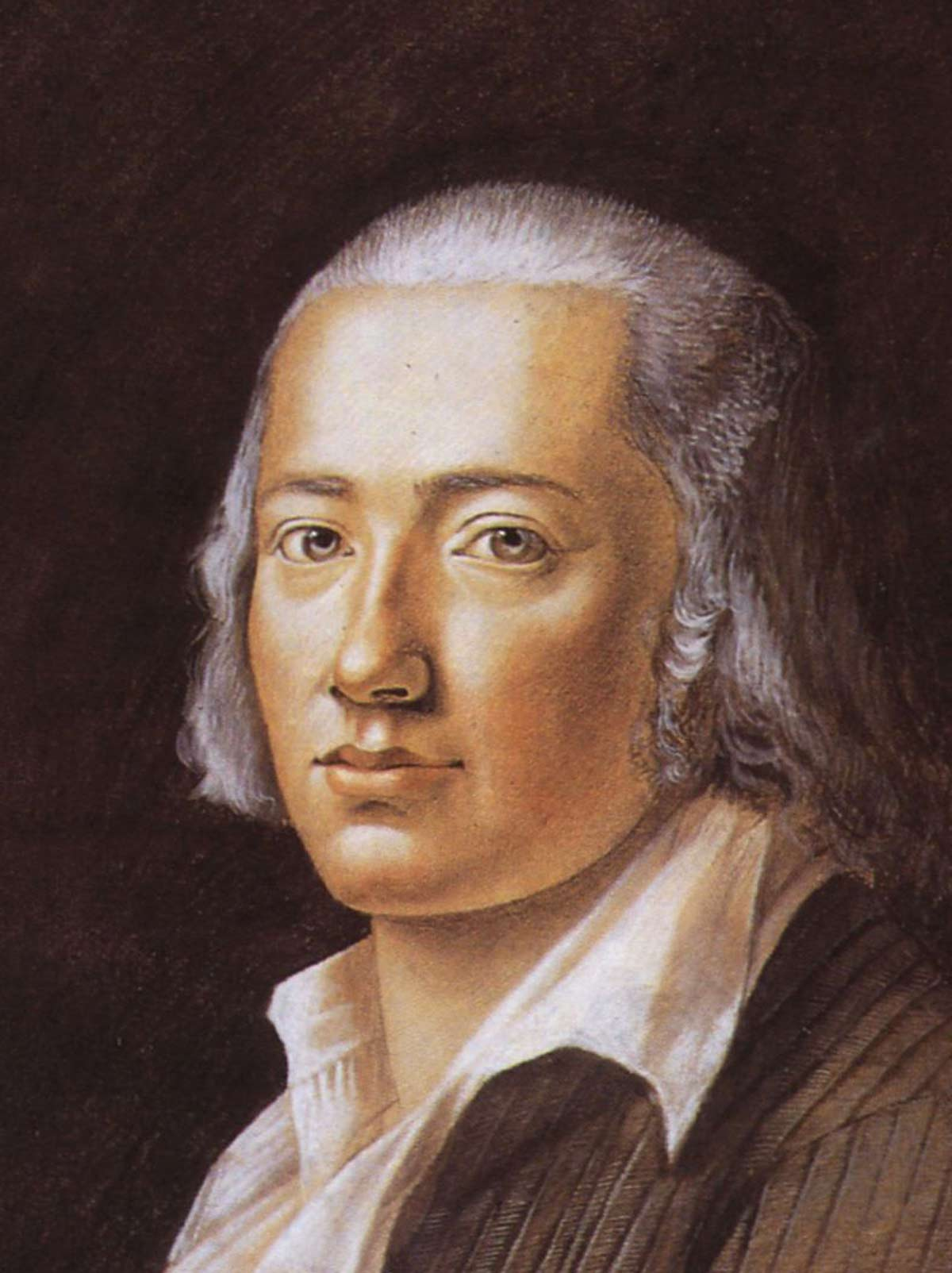
- Hölderlin by Franz Carl Hiemer, 1792
- Born: Johann Christian Friedrich Hölderlin; 20 March 1770; Lauffen am Neckar, Duchy of Württemberg, Holy Roman Empire
- Died: 7 June 1843 (aged 73); Tübingen, Kingdom of Württemberg, German Confederation
- Education: Tübinger Stift (MA, 1790; 1790; Lic., 1793); University of Jena (attended)
- Writing career
- Genre: Lyric poetry
- Notable work: Hyperion
- Movements: Romanticism, German idealism

Johann Christian Friedrich Hölderlin (UK: /ˈhɜːldərliːn/, US: /ˈhʌl-/; German: [ˈfʁiːdʁɪç ˈhœldɐliːn]; 20 March 1770 – 7 June 1843) was a German poet and philosopher. Described by Norbert von Hellingrath as "the most German of Germans", Hölderlin was a key figure of German Romanticism. Particularly due to his early association with and philosophical influence on Georg Wilhelm Friedrich Hegel and Friedrich Wilhelm Joseph Schelling, he was also an important thinker in the development of German idealism.

Born in Lauffen am Neckar, Hölderlin had a childhood marked by bereavement. His mother intended for him to enter the Lutheran ministry, and he attended the Tübinger Stift, where he was friends with Hegel and Schelling. He graduated in 1793 but could not devote himself to the Lutheran faith, instead becoming a tutor. Two years later, he briefly attended the University of Jena, where he interacted with Johann Gottlieb Fichte and Novalis, before resuming his career as a tutor. He struggled to establish himself as a poet, and he was plagued by mental illness. He was sent to a clinic in 1806 but deemed incurable and instead given lodging by a carpenter, Ernst Zimmer. He spent the final 35 years of his life in Zimmer's residence, and died in 1843 at the age of 73.

Hölderlin followed the tradition of Johann Wolfgang von Goethe and Friedrich Schiller as an admirer of Greek mythology and Ancient Greek poets such as Pindar and Sophocles, and melded Christian and Hellenic themes in his works. Martin Heidegger, upon whom Hölderlin had a great influence, said: "Hölderlin is one of our greatest, that is, most impending thinkers because he is our greatest poet."

== Biography ==
=== Early life ===
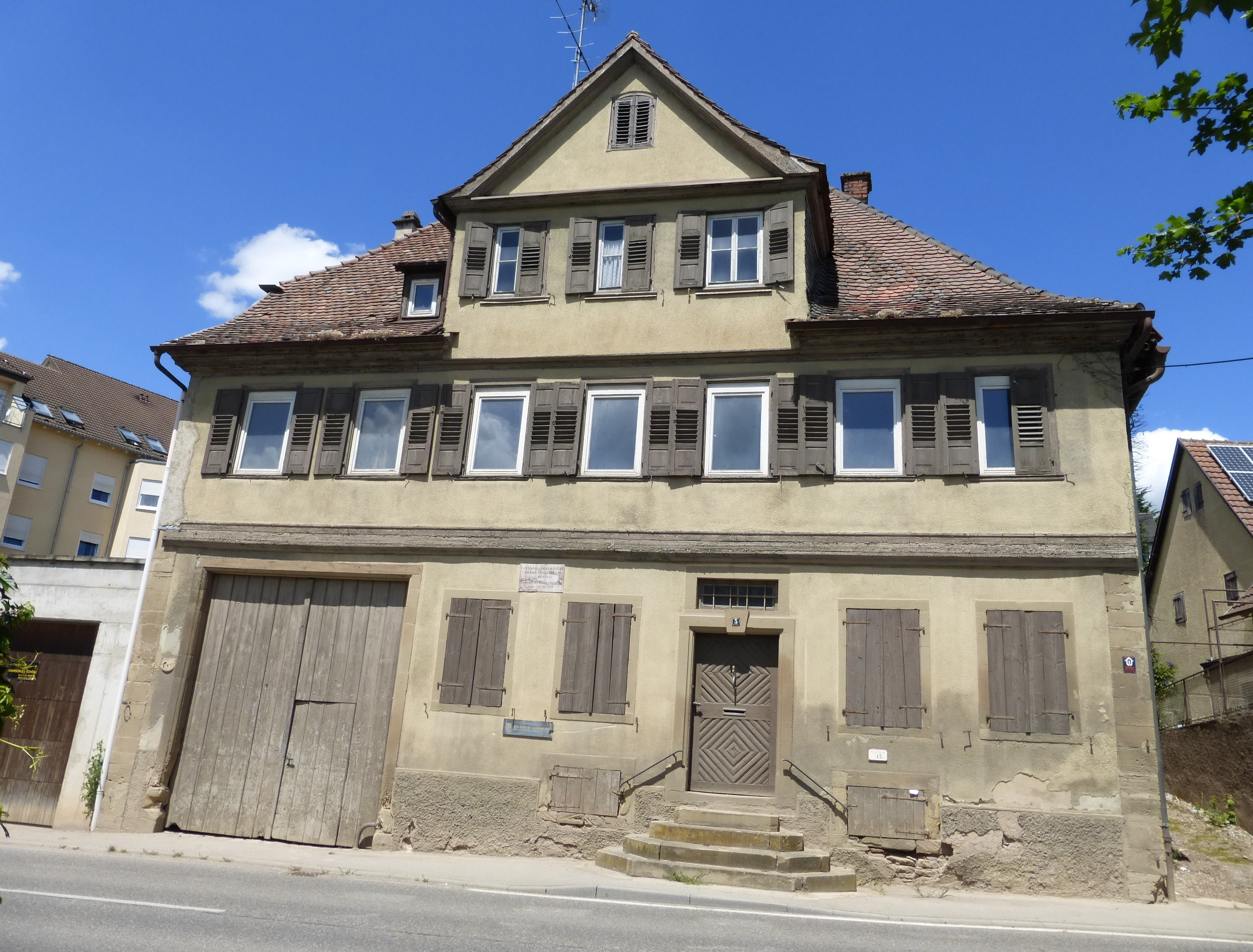
Friedrich Hölderlin's birthplace, Lauffen am Neckar

Johann Christian Friedrich Hölderlin was born on 20 March 1770 in Lauffen am Neckar, then a part of the Duchy of Württemberg. He was the first child of Johanna Christiana Heyn (1748–1828) and Heinrich Friedrich Hölderlin (1736—1772). His father, the manager of a church estate, died when he was two years old, and Friedrich and his sister, Heinrike, were brought up by their mother.

In 1774, his mother moved the family to Nürtingen when she married Johann Christoph Gok. Two years later, Johann Gok became the burgomaster of Nürtingen, and Hölderlin's half-brother, Karl Christoph Friedrich Gok, was born. In 1779, Johann Gok died at the age of 30. Hölderlin later expressed how his childhood was scarred by grief and sorrow, writing in a 1799 correspondence with his mother:

When my second father died, whose love for me I shall never forget, when I felt, with an incomprehensible pain, my orphaned state and saw, each day, your grief and tears, it was then that my soul took on, for the first time, this heaviness that has never left and that could only grow more severe with the years.

=== Education ===
Hölderlin began his education in 1776, and his mother planned for him to join the Lutheran church. In preparation for entrance exams into a monastery, he received additional instruction in Greek, Hebrew, Latin and rhetoric, starting in 1782. During this time, he struck a friendship with Friedrich Wilhelm Joseph Schelling, who was five years Hölderlin's junior. On account of the age difference, Schelling was "subjected to universal teasing" and Hölderlin protected him from abuse by older students. Also during this time, Hölderlin began playing the piano and developed an interest in travel literature through exposure to Georg Forster's A Voyage Round the World.

In 1784, Hölderlin entered the Lower Monastery in Denkendorf and started his formal training for entry into the Lutheran ministry. At Denkendorf, he discovered the poetry of Friedrich Schiller and Friedrich Gottlieb Klopstock, and took tentative steps in composing his own verses. The earliest known letter of Hölderlin's is dated 1784 and addressed to his former tutor Nathanael Köstlin. In the letter, he hinted at his wavering faith in Christianity and anxiety about his mental state.

Hölderlin progressed to the Higher Monastery at Maulbronn in 1786. There he fell in love with Luise Nast, the daughter of the monastery's administrator, and began to doubt his desire to join the ministry; he composed Mein Vorsatz in 1787, in which he states his intention to attain "Pindar's light" and reach "Klopstock-heights". In 1788, he read Schiller's Don Carlos on Luise Nast's recommendation. Hölderlin later wrote a letter to Schiller regarding Don Carlos, stating: "It won't be easy to study Carlos in a rational way, since he was for so many years the magic cloud in which the good god of my youth enveloped me so that I would not see too soon the pettiness and barbarity of the world."

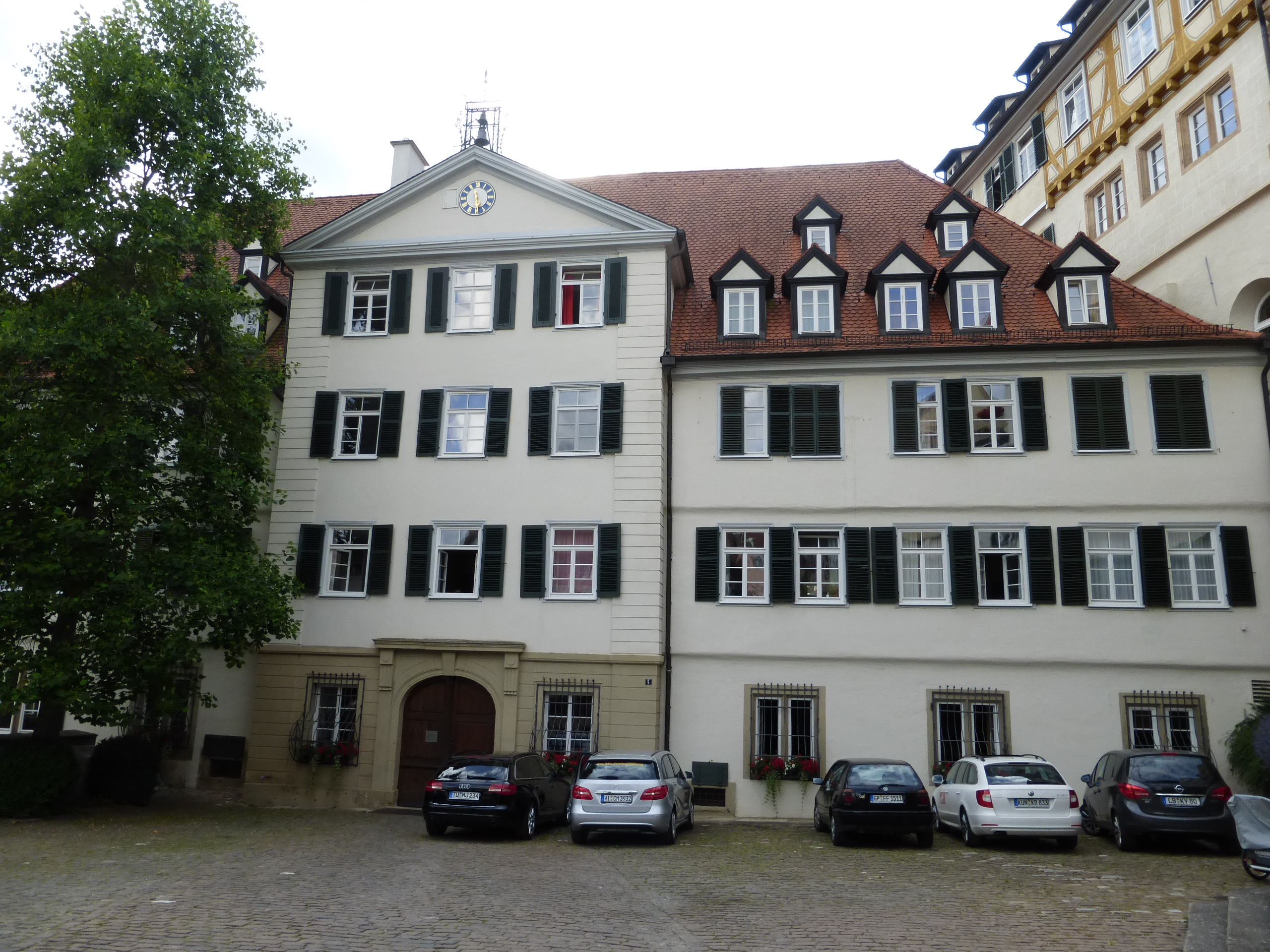
Hölderlin attended the Tübinger Stift (pictured) from 1788 to 1793.

In October 1788, Hölderlin began his theological studies at the Tübinger Stift, where his fellow students included Georg Wilhelm Friedrich Hegel, Isaac von Sinclair and Schelling. It has been speculated that it was Hölderlin who, during their time in Tübingen, brought to Hegel's attention the ideas of Heraclitus regarding the unity of opposites, which Hegel would later develop into his concept of dialectics. In 1789, Hölderlin broke off his engagement with Luise Nast, writing to her: "I wish you happiness if you choose one more worthy than me, and then surely you will understand that you could never have been happy with your morose, ill-humoured, and sickly friend," and expressed his desire to transfer out and study law but succumbed to pressure from his mother to remain in the Stift.

Along with Hegel and Schelling and his other peers during his time in the Stift, Hölderlin was an enthusiastic supporter of the French Revolution. Although he rejected the violence of the Reign of Terror, his commitment to the principles of 1789 remained intense. Hölderlin's republican sympathies influenced many of his most famous works such as Hyperion and The Death of Empedocles.

=== Career ===
After obtaining his magister degree in 1790 and completing his theological examinations (Konsistorialexamen) in 1793, his mother expected him to enter the ministry. Defying her wishes, he chose a literary path. Through Friedrich Schiller's mediation, he secured his first major position as a private tutor for the son of Charlotte von Kalb in Waltershausen, serving from December 1793 to January 1795. For over a century, biographical scholarship assumed Hölderlin left this post in disgrace after fathering an illegitimate child with von Kalb's companion, Wilhelmine Kirms. However, a 2020 archival discovery in Weimar proved the child was actually fathered by Major Heinrich von Kalb, fully exonerating Hölderlin from the long-standing rumor. In early 1795, Hölderlin relocated to the University of Jena, where he attended Johann Gottlieb Fichte's lectures, befriended Novalis, and frequently interacted with Schiller and Johann Wolfgang von Goethe while composing his epistolary novel Hyperion.

There is a seminal manuscript, dated 1797, now known as the Das älteste Systemprogramm des deutschen Idealismus ("The Oldest Systematic Program of German Idealism"). Although the document is in Hegel's handwriting, it is thought to have been written by Hegel, Schelling, Hölderlin, or an unknown fourth person.

As a tutor in Frankfurt am Main from 1796 to 1798, he fell in love with Susette Gontard, the wife of his employer, the banker Jakob Gontard. The feeling was mutual, and this relationship became the most important in Hölderlin's life. After a while, their affair was discovered, and Hölderlin was harshly dismissed. He then lived in Homburg from 1798 to 1800, meeting Susette in secret once a month and attempting to establish himself as a poet, but his life was plagued by financial worries and he had to accept a small allowance from his mother. His mandated separation from Susette Gontard also worsened Hölderlin's doubts about himself and his value as a poet; he wished to transform German culture but did not have the influence he needed. From 1797 to 1800, he produced three versions—all unfinished—of a tragedy in the Greek manner, The Death of Empedocles, and composed odes in the vein of the Ancient Greeks Alcaeus and Asclepiades of Samos.

=== Mental breakdown ===
During the late 1790s, Hölderlin increasingly suffered from severe bouts of what his contemporaries called "hypochondria" (melancholy), a condition that worsened after his forced separation from Susette Gontard. While 20th-century psychiatrists retrospectively diagnosed his subsequent breakdown as schizophrenia, no such clinical framework existed during his lifetime. After a sojourn in Stuttgart at the end of 1800, likely to work on his translations of Pindar, he found further employment as a tutor in Hauptwyl, Switzerland, and then at the household of the Hamburg consul in Bordeaux, in 1802. His stay in the French city is celebrated in Andenken ("Remembrance"), one of his greatest poems. In a few months, however, he returned home on foot via Paris (where he saw authentic Greek sculptures, as opposed to Roman or modern copies, for the only time in his life). He arrived at his home in Nürtingen both physically and mentally exhausted in late 1802, and learned that Gontard had died from influenza in Frankfurt at around the same time.

At his home in Nürtingen with his mother, a devout Christian, Hölderlin melded his Hellenism with Christianity and sought to unite ancient values with modern life; in his elegy Brod und Wein ("Bread and Wine"), Christ is seen as sequential to the Greek gods, bringing bread from the earth and wine from Dionysus. After two years in Nürtingen, Hölderlin was taken to the court of Homburg by Isaac von Sinclair, who found a sinecure for him as court librarian, but in 1805 von Sinclair was denounced as a conspirator and tried for treason. Hölderlin was in danger of being tried too but was declared mentally unfit to stand trial. On 11 September 1806, he was delivered into the clinic at Tübingen run by Dr. Johann Heinrich Ferdinand von Autenrieth, the inventor of a mask for the prevention of screaming in the mentally ill.

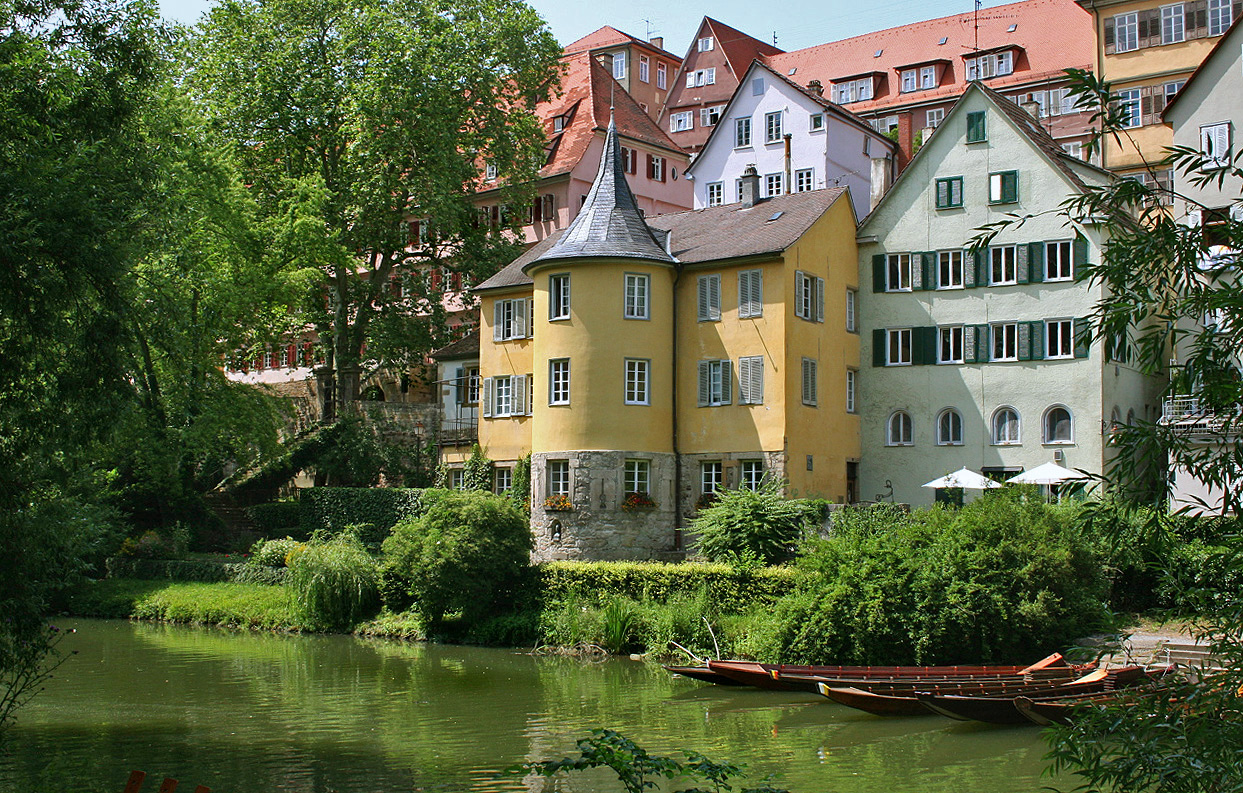
The first floor of the yellow tower (now known as the Hölderlinturm) was Hölderlin's place of residence from 1807 until his death in 1843.

The clinic was attached to the University of Tübingen and the poet Justinus Kerner, then a student of medicine, was assigned to look after Hölderlin. The following year Hölderlin was discharged as incurable and given three years to live, but was taken in by the carpenter Ernst Zimmer (a cultured man, who had read Hyperion) and given a room in his house in Tübingen, which had been a tower in the old city wall with a view across the Neckar river. The tower would later be named the Hölderlinturm, after the poet's 36-year-long stay in the room. His residence in the building made up the second half of his life and is also referred to as the Turmzeit (or "Tower period").

=== Later life and death ===
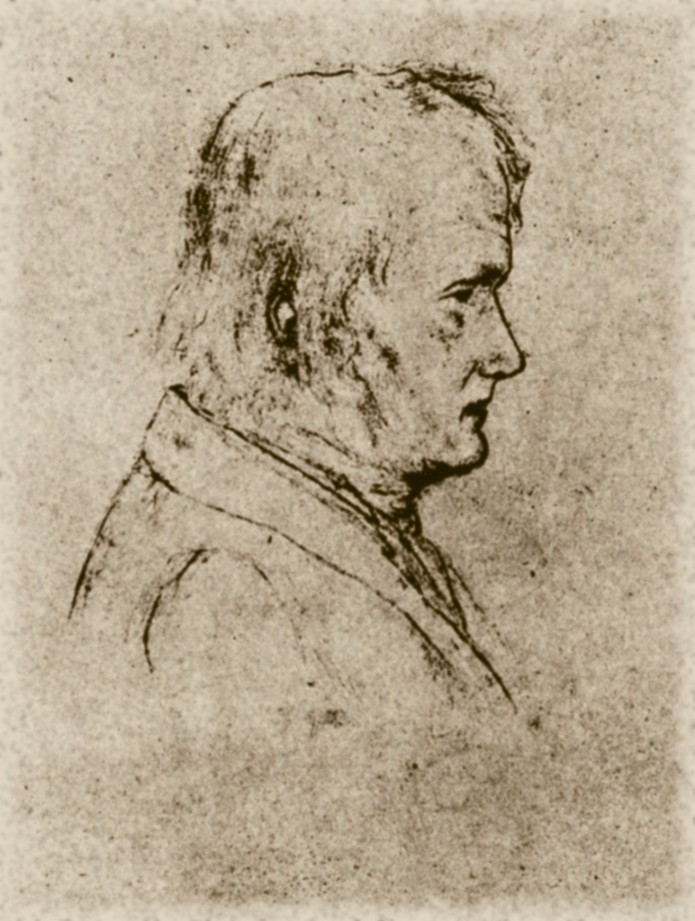
Sketch of Hölderlin by Luise Keller, 1842

In the tower, Hölderlin continued to write poetry of a simplicity and formality quite unlike what he had been writing up to 1805. As time went on he became a minor tourist attraction and was visited by curious travelers and autograph-hunters. Often he would play the piano or spontaneously write short verses for such visitors, pure in versification but almost empty of affect—although a few of these (such as the famous Die Linien des Lebens ["The Lines of Life"], which he wrote out for his carer Zimmer on a piece of wood) have been set to music by many composers.

Hölderlin's own family did not financially support him but petitioned successfully for his upkeep to be paid by the state. His mother and sister never visited him, and his stepbrother did so only once. His mother died in 1828: his sister and stepbrother quarreled over the inheritance, arguing that too large a share had been allotted to Hölderlin, and unsuccessfully tried to have the will overturned in court. Neither of them attended his funeral in 1843 nor did his childhood friends, Hegel (as he had died roughly a decade prior) and Schelling, who had long since ignored him; the Zimmer family were his only mourners. His inheritance, including the patrimony left to him by his father when he was two, had been kept from him by his mother and was untouched and continually accruing interest. He died a rich man, but did not know it.

== Works ==
The poetry of Hölderlin, widely recognized today as one of the highest points of German literature, was little known or understood during his lifetime, and slipped into obscurity shortly after his death; his illness and reclusion made him fade from his contemporaries' consciousness—and, even though selections of his work were published by his friends during his lifetime, it was largely ignored for the rest of the 19th century.

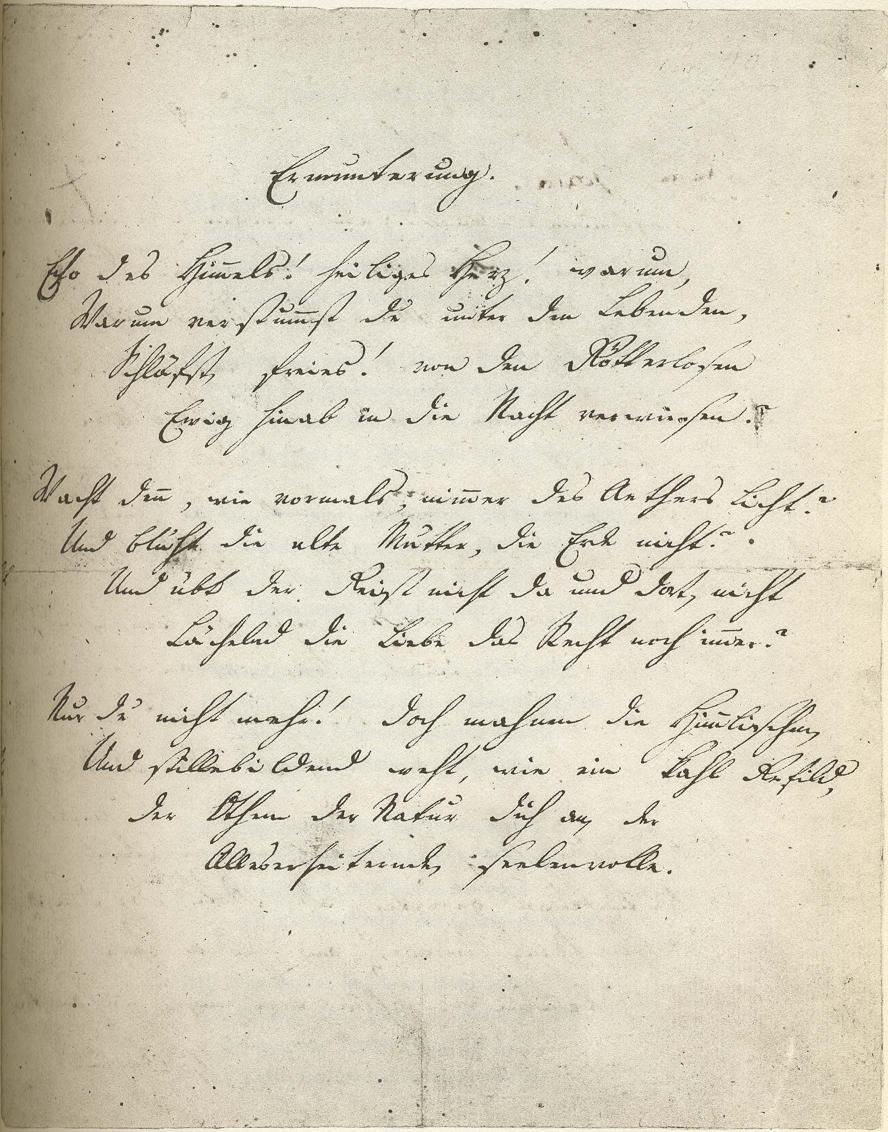
Hölderlin's autograph of the first three stanzas of his ode "Ermunterung" ("Exhortation")

Like Goethe and Schiller, his older contemporaries, Hölderlin was a fervent admirer of ancient Greek culture, but for him the Greek gods were not the plaster figures of conventional classicism, but wonderfully life-giving actual presences, yet at the same time terrifying. Much later, Friedrich Nietzsche would recognize Hölderlin as the poet who first acknowledged the Orphic and Dionysian Greece of the mysteries, which he would fuse with the Pietism of his native Swabia in a highly original religious experience. Hölderlin developed an early idea of cyclical history and therefore believed political radicalism and an aesthetic interest in antiquity, and, in parallel, Christianity and Paganism should be fused. He understood and sympathised with the Greek idea of the tragic fall, which he expressed movingly in the last stanza of his "Hyperions Schicksalslied" ("Hyperion's Song of Destiny").

In the great poems of his maturity, Hölderlin would generally adopt a large-scale, expansive and unrhymed style. Together with these long hymns, odes and elegies—which included "Der Archipelagus" ("The Archipelago"), "Brod und Wein" ("Bread and Wine") and "Patmos"—he also cultivated a crisper, more concise manner in epigrams and couplets, and in short poems like the famous "Hälfte des Lebens" ("The Middle of Life").

In the years after his return from Bordeaux, he completed some of his greatest poems but also, once they were finished, returned to them repeatedly, creating new and stranger versions sometimes in several layers on the same manuscript, which makes the editing of his works troublesome. Some of these later versions (and some later poems) are fragmentary, but they have astonishing intensity. He seems sometimes also to have considered the fragments, even with unfinished lines and incomplete sentence-structure, to be poems in themselves. This obsessive revising and his stand-alone fragments were once considered evidence of his mental disorder, but they were to prove very influential on later poets such as Paul Celan. In his years of madness, Hölderlin would occasionally pencil ingenuous rhymed quatrains, sometimes of a childlike beauty, which he would sign with fantastic names (most often "Scardanelli") and give fictitious dates from previous or future centuries.

Hölderlin composed many of his long and profound poems in the style of the Pindaric hymns (of the Greek poet). He revived this form and fused it with philosophy, Christianity, and Romantic naturalism. Notable examples of Hölderlin's hymns:

- "Hymn to Freedom" (Hymne an die Freiheit)
- "Hymn to Beauty" (Hymne an die Schönheit)
- "Hymn to Humanity" (Hymne an die Menschheit)
- "Bread and Wine" (Brot und Wein) — one of his most celebrated hymns

== Dissemination and influence ==
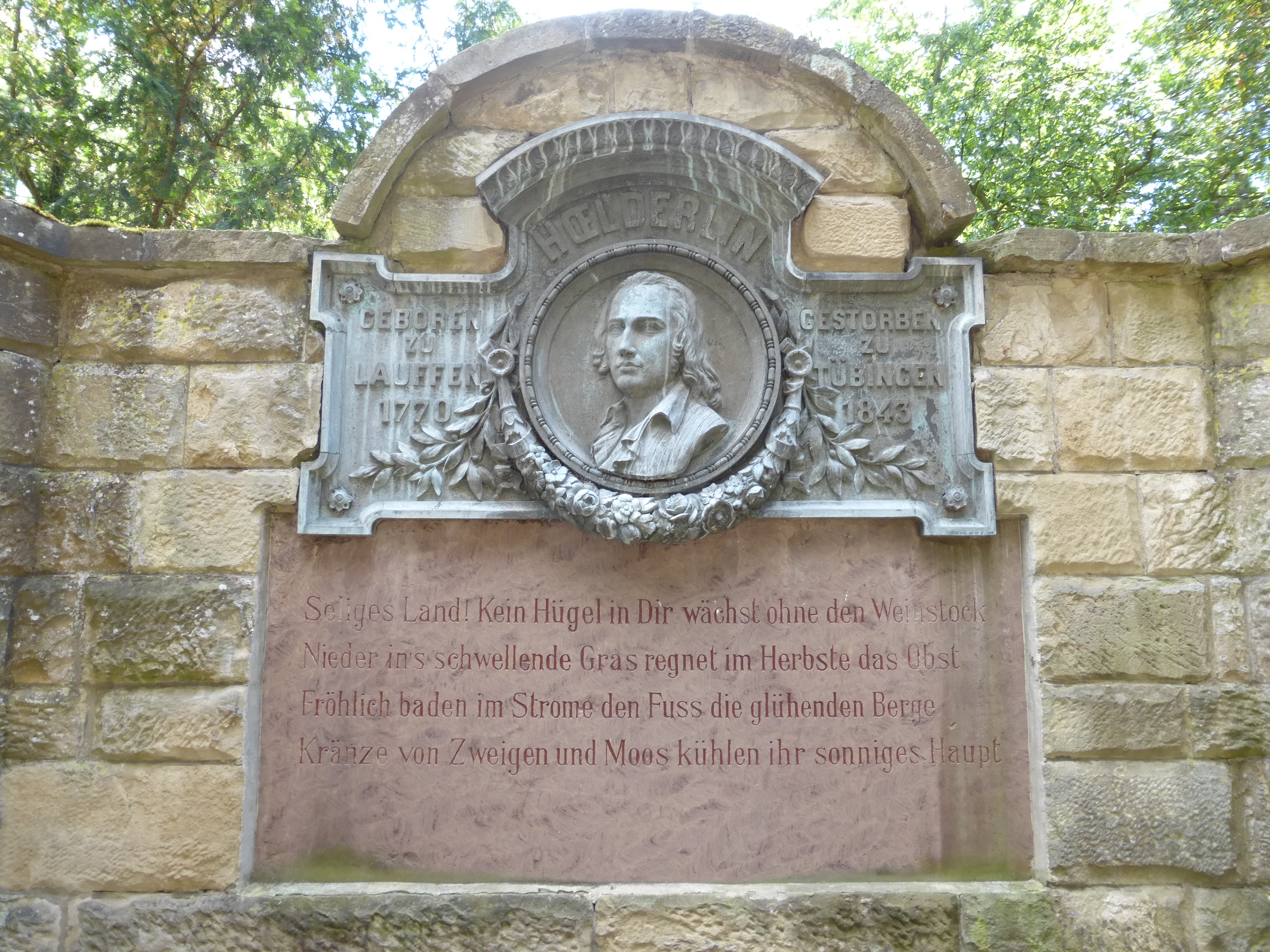
Friedrich Hölderlin Memorial in Lauffen am Neckar

Hölderlin's major publication in his lifetime was his novel Hyperion, which was issued in two volumes (1797 and 1799). Various individual poems were published but attracted little attention. In 1799 he produced a periodical, Iduna.

In 1804, his translations of the dramas of Sophocles were published but were generally met with derision over their apparent artificiality and difficulty, which according to his critics were caused by transposing Greek idioms into German. However, 20th-century theorists of translation such as Walter Benjamin have vindicated them, showing their importance as a new—and greatly influential—model of poetic translation. Der Rhein and Patmos, two of the longest and most densely charged of his hymns, appeared in a poetic calendar in 1808.

Wilhelm Waiblinger, who visited Hölderlin in his tower repeatedly in 1822–23 and depicted him in the protagonist of his novel Phaëthon, stated the necessity of issuing an edition of his poems, and the first collection of his poetry was released by Ludwig Uhland and Gustav Schwab in 1826. However, Uhland and Schwab omitted anything they suspected might be "touched by insanity", which included much of Hölderlin's fragmented works. A copy of this collection was given to Hölderlin, but later was stolen by an autograph-hunter. A second, enlarged edition with a biographical essay appeared in 1842, the year before Hölderlin's death.

Only in 1913 did Norbert von Hellingrath, a member of the literary Circle led by the German Symbolist poet Stefan George, publish the first two volumes of what eventually became a six-volume edition of Hölderlin's poems, prose and letters (the "Berlin Edition", Berliner Ausgabe). For the first time, Hölderlin's hymnic drafts and fragments were published and it became possible to gain some overview of his work in the years between 1800 and 1807, which had been only sparsely covered in earlier editions. The Berlin edition and von Hellingrath's advocacy led to Hölderlin posthumously receiving the recognition that had always eluded him in life. As a result, Hölderlin has been recognized since 1913 as one of the greatest poets ever to write in the German language.

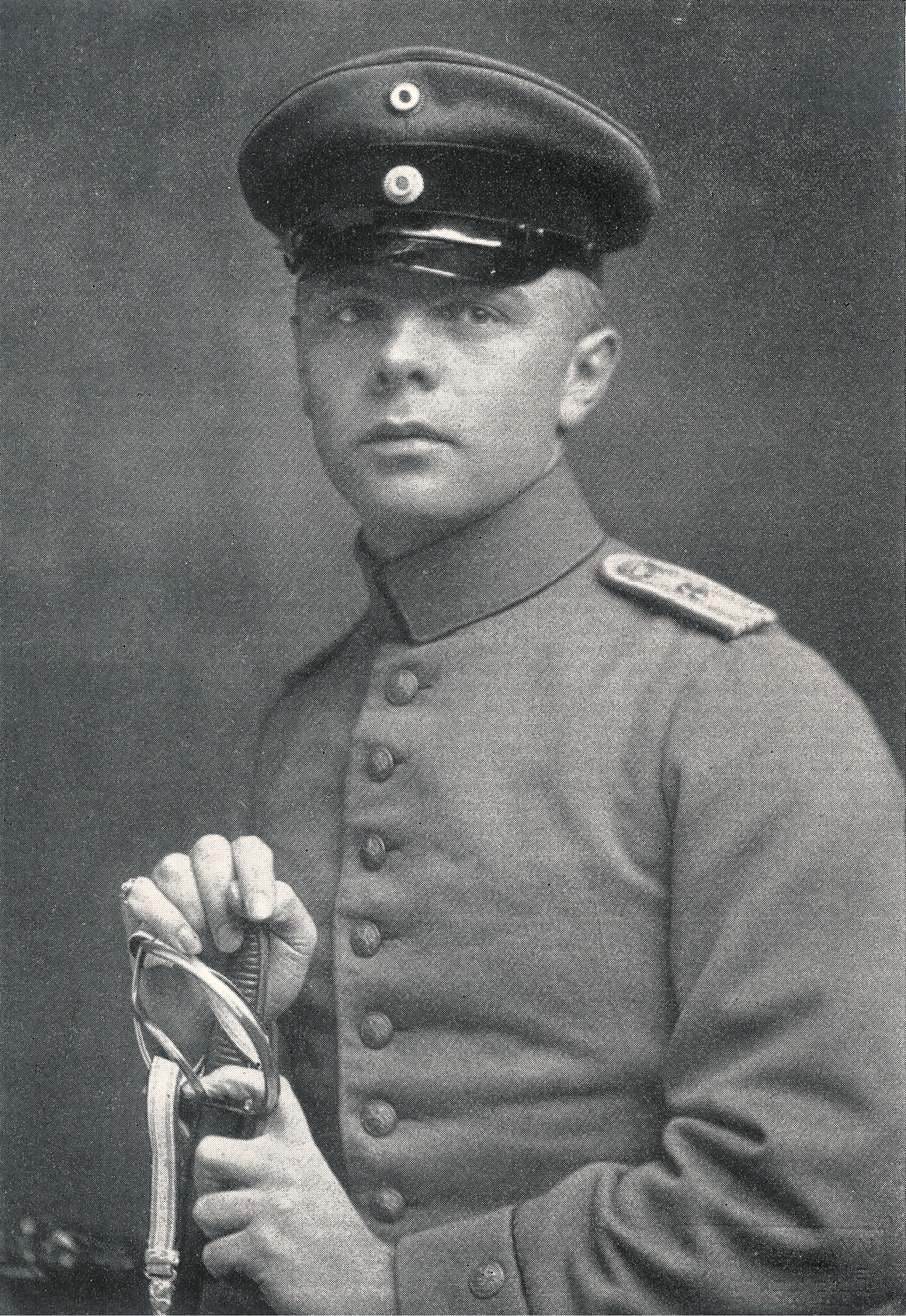
Norbert von Hellingrath during World War I

Norbert von Hellingrath enlisted in the Imperial German Army at the outbreak of World War I and was killed in action at the Battle of Verdun in 1916. The fourth volume of the Berlin edition was published posthumously. The Berlin Edition was completed after the German Revolution of 1918 by Friedrich Seebass and Ludwig von Pigenot; the remaining volumes appeared in Berlin between 1922 and 1923.

Already in 1912, before the Berlin Edition began to appear, Rainer Maria Rilke composed his first two Duino Elegies whose form and spirit draw strongly on the hymns and elegies of Hölderlin. Rilke had met von Hellingrath a few years earlier and had seen some of the hymn drafts, and the Duino Elegies heralded the beginning of a new appreciation of Hölderlin's late work. Although his hymns can hardly be imitated, they have become a powerful influence on modern poetry in German and other languages, and are sometimes cited as the very crown of German lyric poetry.

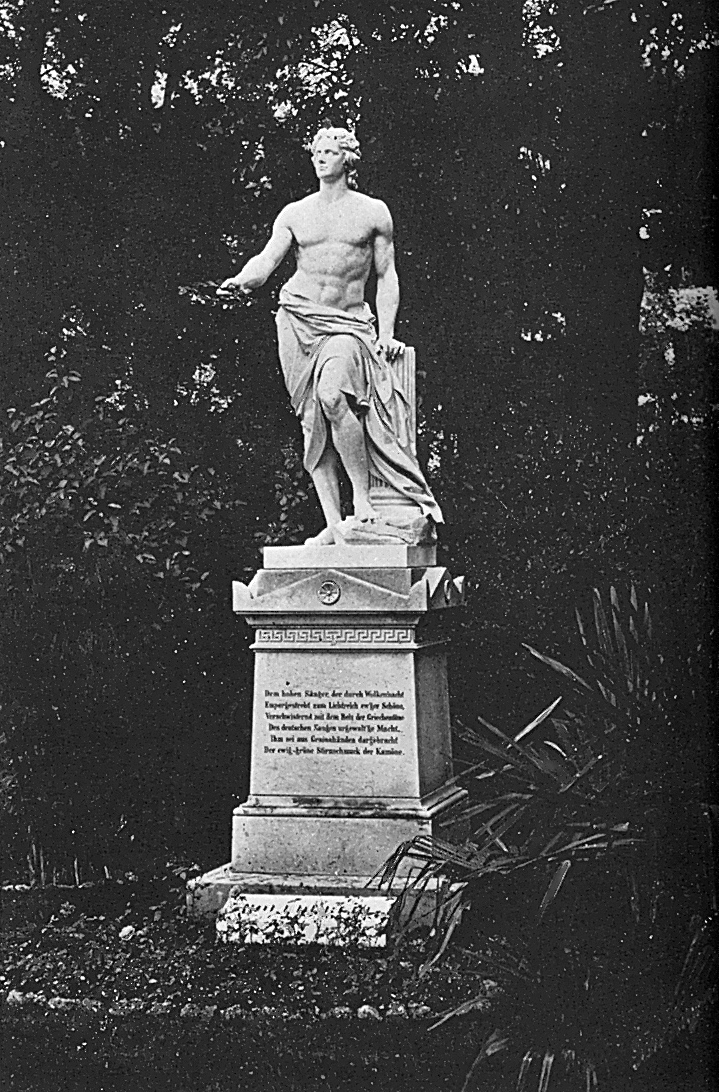
Hölderlin Monument in the Alter Botanischer Garten Tübingen, 1881

The Berlin Edition was to some extent superseded by the Stuttgart Edition (Grosse Stuttgarter Ausgabe), which began to be published in 1943 and eventually saw completion in 1986. This undertaking was much more rigorous in textual criticism than the Berlin Edition and solved many issues of interpretation raised by Hölderlin's unfinished and undated texts (sometimes several versions of the same poem with major differences). Meanwhile, a third complete edition, the Frankfurt Critical Edition (Frankfurter Historisch-kritische Ausgabe), began publication in 1975 under the editorship of Dietrich Sattler.

Though Hölderlin's hymnic style—dependent as it is on a genuine belief in the divine—creates a deeply personal fusion of Greek mythic figures and romantic mysticism about nature, which can appear both strange and enticing, his shorter and sometimes more fragmentary poems have exerted wide influence too on later German poets, from Georg Trakl onwards. He also had an influence on the poetry of Hermann Hesse and Paul Celan. (Celan wrote a poem about Hölderlin, called "Tübingen, January" which ends with the word Pallaksch—according to Schwab, Hölderlin's favourite neologism "which sometimes meant Yes, sometimes No".)

Hölderlin was also a thinker who wrote, fragmentarily, on poetic theory and philosophical matters. His theoretical works, such as the essays "Das Werden im Vergehen" ("Becoming in Dissolution") and "Urteil und Sein" ("Judgement and Being") are insightful and important if somewhat tortuous and difficult to parse. They raise many of the key problems also addressed by his Tübingen roommates Hegel and Schelling, and, though his poetry was never "theory-driven", the interpretation and exegesis of some of his more difficult poems have given rise to profound philosophical speculation by thinkers such as Martin Heidegger, Theodor Adorno, Jacques Derrida, Michel Foucault and Alain Badiou.

=== Music ===
Hölderlin's poetry has inspired many composers, generating vocal music and instrumental music.

Vocal music

One of the earliest settings of Hölderlin's poetry is Schicksalslied by Johannes Brahms, based on Hyperions Schicksalslied. Other composers of Hölderlin settings include Peter Cornelius, Hans Pfitzner, Richard Strauss (Drei Hymnen), Max Reger ("An die Hoffnung"), Alphons Diepenbrock (Die Nacht), Walter Braunfels ("Der Tod fürs Vaterland"), Richard Wetz (Hyperion), Josef Matthias Hauer, Denise Roger, Hermann Reutter, Margarete Schweikert, Stefan Wolpe, Paul Hindemith, Benjamin Britten (Sechs Hölderlin-Fragmente), Hans Werner Henze, Bruno Maderna (Hyperion, Stele an Diotima), Luigi Nono (Prometeo), Heinz Holliger (the Scardanelli-Zyklus), Hans Zender (Hölderlin lesen I-IV), György Kurtág (who planned an opera on Hölderlin), György Ligeti (Three Fantasies after Friedrich Hölderlin), Hanns Eisler (Hollywood Liederbuch), Viktor Ullmann, Wolfgang von Schweinitz, Walter Zimmermann (Hyperion, an epistolary opera) and Wolfgang Rihm. Siegfried Matthus composed the orchestral song cycle Hyperion-Fragmente. Carl Orff used Hölderlin's German translations of Sophocles in his operas Antigone and Oedipus der Tyrann. In 2020, for the 250th anniversary of Hölderlin's birth, the American composaer Chris Jarrett wrote "Sechs Hölderlin Lieder" for baritone and piano. They have been recorded on the DaVinci Classics label and are available in print as well.

Wilhelm Killmayer based three song cycles, Hölderlin-Lieder, for tenor and orchestra on Hölderlin's late poems; Kaija Saariaho's Tag des Jahrs (2001) for mixed choir and electronics is based on four of these poems, while more are set in her Überzeugung for choir (2001) and Die Aussicht for soprano and four instruments (1996). In 2003, Graham Waterhouse composed a song cycle, Sechs späteste Lieder, for voice and cello based on six of Hölderlin's late poems. Lucien Posman based a concerto-cantate for clarinet, choir, piano & percussion on 3 Hölderlin poems (Teil 1. Die Eichbäume, Teil 2. Mein Eigentum, Teil 3. Da ich ein Knabe war) (2015). He also set An die Parzen to music for choir & piano (2012) and Hälfte des Lebens for choir. Several works by Georg Friedrich Haas take their titles or text from Hölderlin's writing, including Hyperion, Nacht, and the solo ensemble "... Einklang freier Wesen ..." as well as its constituent solo pieces each named "... aus freier Lust ... verbunden ...". In 2020, as part of the German celebration of Hölderlin's 250th birthday, Chris Jarrett composed his "Sechs Hölderlin Lieder" for baritone and piano.

Finnish melodic death metal band Insomnium set Hölderlin's verses to music in several of their songs, and many songs of Swedish alternative rock band ALPHA 60 also contain lyrical references to Hölderlin's poetry.

Instrumental music

Robert Schumann's late piano suite Gesänge der Frühe was inspired by Hölderlin, as was Luigi Nono's string quartet Fragmente-Stille, an Diotima and parts of his opera Prometeo. Josef Matthias Hauer wrote many piano pieces inspired by individual lines of Hölderlin's poems. Paul Hindemith's First Piano Sonata is influenced by Hölderlin's poem Der Main. Hans Werner Henze's Seventh Symphony is partly inspired by Hölderlin.

=== Cinema ===
- A 1981–1982 television drama, Untertänigst Scardanelli (The Loyal Scardanelli), directed by Jonatan Briel in Berlin.
- The 1985 film Half of Life is named after a poem of Hölderlin and deals with the secret relationship between Hölderlin and Susette Gontard.
- In 1986 and 1988, Danièle Huillet and Jean-Marie Straub shot two films, Der Tod des Empedokles and Schwarze Sünde, in Sicily, which were both based on the drama Empedokles (respectively for the two films they used the first and third version of the text).
- German director Harald Bergmann has dedicated several works to Hölderlin; these include the movies Lyrische Suite/Das untergehende Vaterland (1992), Hölderlin Comics (1994), Scardanelli (2000) and Passion Hölderlin (2003).
- A 2004 film, The Ister, is based on Martin Heidegger's 1942 lecture course (published as Hölderlin's Hymn "The Ister").

== English translations ==
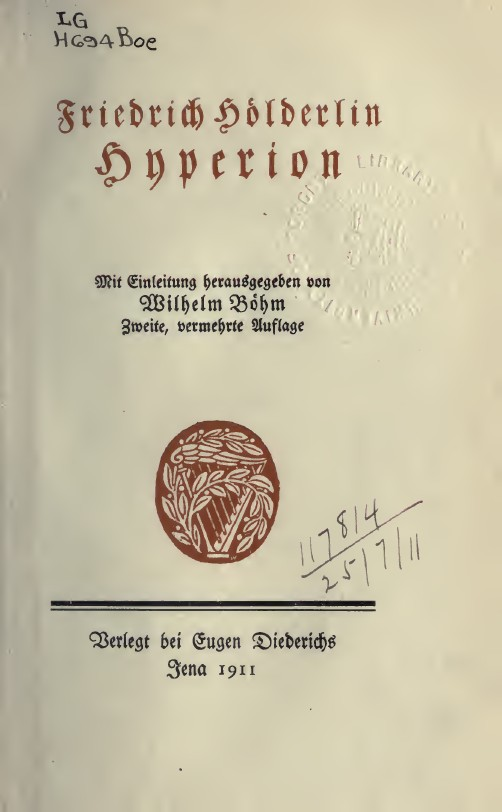
Hyperion

- Some Poems of Friedrich Holderlin. Trans. Frederic Prokosch. (Norfolk, CT: New Directions, 1943).
- Alcaic Poems. Trans. Elizabeth Henderson. (London: Wolf, 1962; New York: Unger, 1963). ISBN 978-0-85496-303-4
- Friedrich Hölderlin: Poems & Fragments. Trans. Michael Hamburger. (London: Routledge & Kegan Paul, 1966; 4ed. London: Anvil Press, 2004). ISBN 978-0-85646-245-0
- Friedrich Hölderlin, Eduard Mörike: Selected Poems. Trans. Christopher Middleton (Chicago: University of Chicago, 1972). ISBN 978-0-226-34934-3
- Poems of Friedrich Holderlin: The Fire of the Gods Drives Us to Set Forth by Day and by Night. Trans. James Mitchell. (San Francisco: Hoddypodge, 1978; 2ed San Francisco: Ithuriel's Spear, 2004). ISBN 978-0-9749502-9-7
- Hymns and Fragments. Trans. Richard Sieburth. (Princeton: Princeton University, 1984). ISBN 978-0-691-01412-8
- Friedrich Hölderlin: Essays and Letters on Theory. Trans. Thomas Pfau. (Albany, NY: State University of New York, 1988). ISBN 978-0-88706-558-3
- Hyperion and Selected Poems. The German Library vol.22. Ed. Eric L. Santner. Trans. C. Middleton, R. Sieburth, M. Hamburger. (New York: Continuum, 1990). ISBN 978-0-8264-0334-6
- Friedrich Hölderlin: Selected Poems. Trans. David Constantine. (Newcastle upon Tyne: Bloodaxe, 1990; 2ed 1996; 3ed 2018) ISBN 9781780374017
- Friedrich Hölderlin: Selected Poems and Fragments. Ed. Jeremy Adler. Trans. Michael Hamburger. (London: Penguin, 1996). ISBN 978-0-14-042416-4
- What I Own: Versions of Hölderlin and Mandelshtam. Trans. John Riley and Tim Longville. (Manchester: Carcanet, 1998). ISBN 978-1-85754-175-5
- Holderlin's Sophocles: Oedipus and Antigone. Trans. David Constantine. (Newcastle upon Tyne: Bloodaxe, 2001). ISBN 978-1-85224-543-6
- Odes and Elegies. Trans. Nick Hoff. (Middletown, CT: Wesleyan Press, 2008). ISBN 978-0-8195-6890-8
- Hyperion. Trans. Ross Benjamin. (Brooklyn, NY: Archipelago Books, 2008) ISBN 978-0-9793330-2-6
- Selected Poems of Friedrich Hölderlin. Trans. Maxine Chernoff and Paul Hoover. (Richmond, CA: Omnidawn, 2008). ISBN 978-1-890650-35-3
- Essays and Letters. Trans. Jeremy Adler and Charlie Louth. (London: Penguin, 2009). ISBN 978-0-14-044708-8
- The Death of Empedocles: A Mourning-Play. Trans. David Farrell Krell. (Albany, NY: State University of New York, 2009). ISBN 978-0-7914-7648-2
- Selected Poems. Trans. Emery George (Kylix Press, 2011)
- Poems at the Window / Poèmes à la Fenêtre, Hölderlin's late contemplative poems, English and French rhymed and metered translations by Claude Neuman, trilingual German-English-French edition, Editions www.ressouvenances.fr, 2017
- Aeolic Odes / Odes éoliennes, English and French metered translations by Claude Neuman, trilingual German-English-French edition, Editions www.ressouvenances.fr, 2019; bilingual German-English edition : Edwin Mellen Press, 2022
- The Elegies / Les Elegies, English and French metered translations by Claude Neuman, trilingual German-English-French edition, Editions www.ressouvenances.fr, 2020; bilingual German-English edition : Edwin Mellen Press, 2022

== See also ==
- Hölderlin's Madness

== Sources ==
- Internationale Hölderlin-Bibliographie (IHB). Hrsg. vom Hölderlin-Archiv der Württembergischen Landesbibliothek Stuttgart. 1804–1983. Bearb. Von Maria Kohler. Stuttgart 1985.
- Internationale Hölderlin-Bibliographie (IHB). Hrsg. vom Hölderlin-Archiv der Württembergischen Landesbibliothek Stuttgart. Bearb. Von Werner Paul Sohnle und Marianne Schütz, online 1984 ff (after 1 January 2001: IHB online).
