= Isaac von Sinclair =

German writer and diplomat

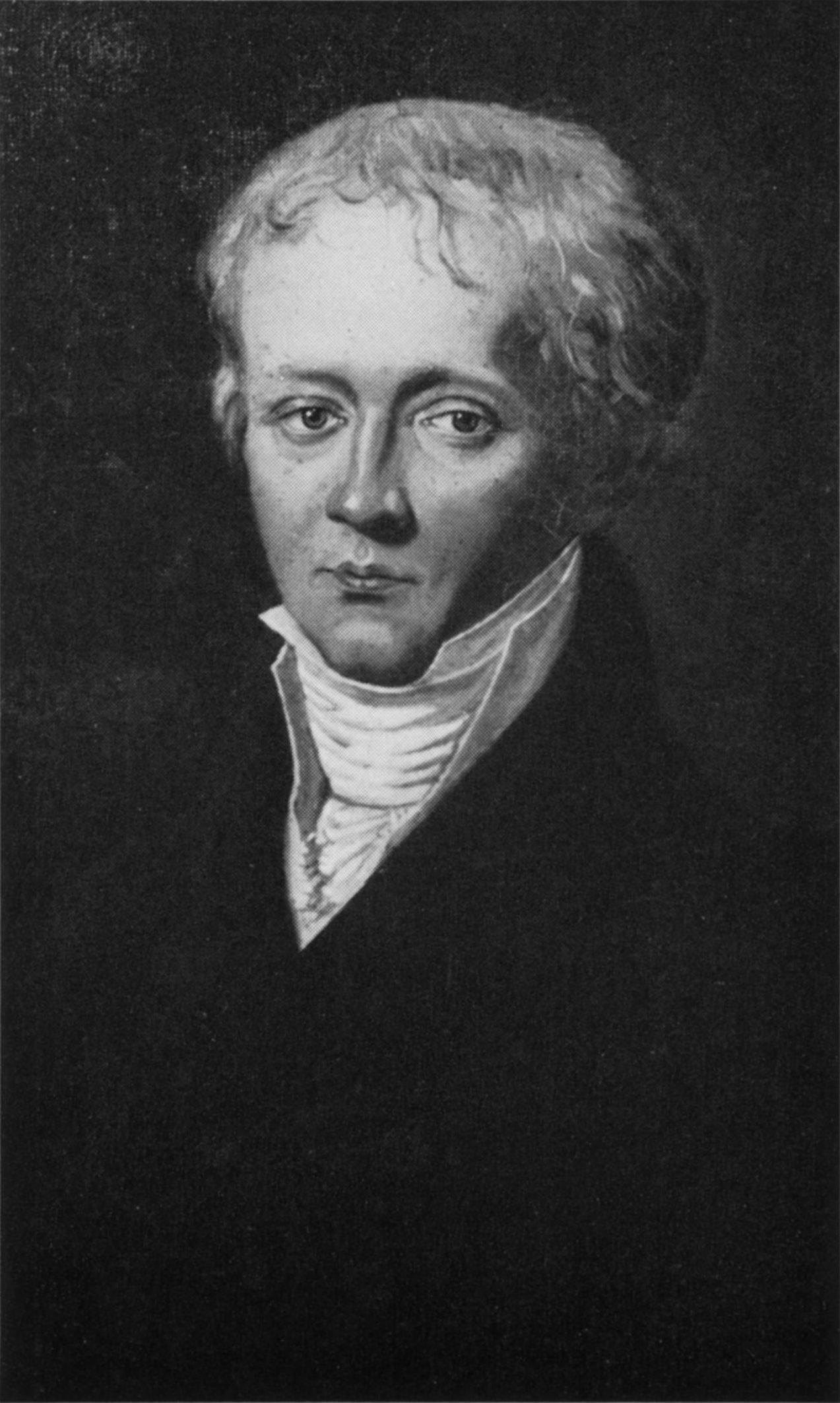
Isaac von Sinclair by Favorin Lerebours (1808)

Isaac von Sinclair (3 October 1775 – 29 April 1815) was a German writer and diplomat. He was a friend of the poet Friedrich Hölderlin.

== Life ==
=== Youth ===
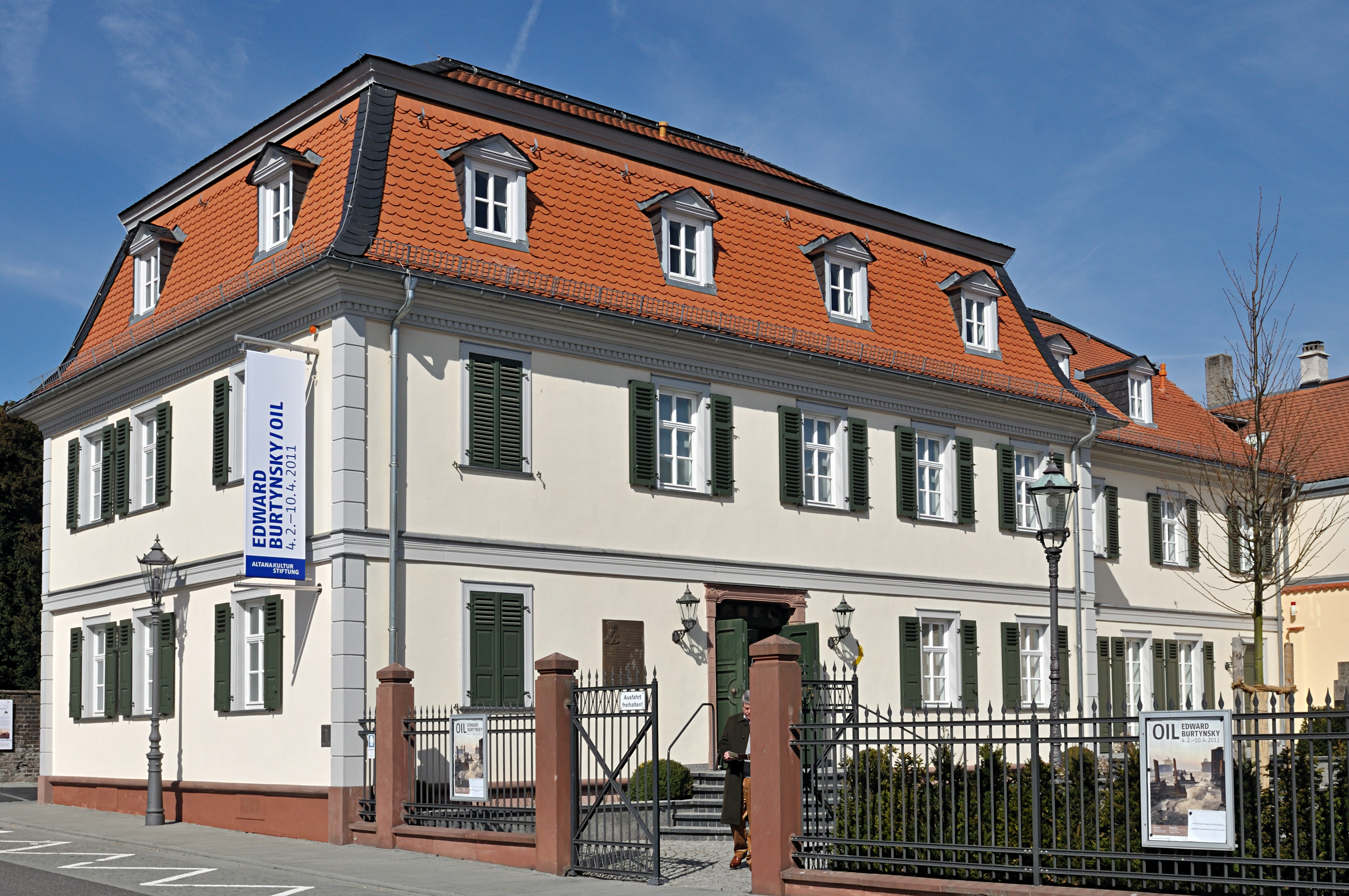
The house in which he was born in Bad Homburg

Born in Homburg vor der Höhe in 1775, he came from a family of Scottish ancestry whose surname of Sinclair or St. Clair indicates Anglo-Norman origins, linking it to the Clan Sinclair and Castle Sinclair Girnigoe. His father Alexander von Sinclair was a lawyer and had studied from 1733 in Jena before moving to Bad Homburg in April 1752 to become tutor to three-year-old Frederick V, Landgrave of Hesse-Homburg.

Alexander died in 1778, when Isaac was only three - from then on he was educated with Frederick V's younger children. He studied law from 1792 to 1793 at University of Tübingen and from 1793 to 1795 at University of Jena.

=== Friendship with Hölderlin ===
Hölderlin and von Sinclair first met in May 1794 during their studies in Jena, possibly even in Johann Gottlieb Fichte's philosophy lectures, and together they joined the Harmonistenorden student order. He was an enthusiastic supporter of the French Revolution, was close to some of the members of the 'Gesellschaft der freien Männer' and participated in one of the then-frequent students tumults. In 1796 von Sinclair entered the civil service of the landgraviate of Hesse-Homburg, but kept in touch with Hölderlin, giving him friendly support.

Hölderlin included von Sinclair in his 1797-99 novel Hyperion as the character Alabanda, whilst his poem An Eduard (To Eduard, 1800–04) elaborated on the revolutionary brotherhood between the two men. After leaving the Gontard household in Frankfurt am Main, Hölderlin came to Homburg at the end of September 1798 and stayed until June 1799. He was invited back to Homburg by von Sinclair in June 1804 after the death of Susette Gontard and gained him a post as court librarian.

=== Trial ===
To remedy its parlous state finances, Frederick V wanted to set up a state lottery and so engaged the financier Alexander Blankenstein, backed by von Sinclair. However, von Sinclair later changed his mind and tried to expose Blankenstein's deceptions and take action against him - in response Blankenstein accused von Sinclair of treason to Frederick, Elector of Württemberg, long an enemy of the estates.

Blankenstein appealed to a round-table discussion in June 1804 in Stuttgart, also attended by von Sinclair and Christian Friedrich Baz, mayor of Ludwigsburg and one of the radical leaders in Württemberg's estates general. Blankenstein afterwards claimed that there was a plot afoot to assassinate the Elector at the meeting and start a revolution. Von Sinclair was a subject of Hesse-Homburg not Württemberg, but the Elector gained Frederick V's permission to arrest him and so he was taken to Württemberg on 26 February 1805 and imprisoned.

A commission tried von Sinclair, Baz and other alleged conspirators. Hölderlin was also in danger of being tried but was declared mentally unfit to stand trial. Müller, a doctor and court-apothecary from Homburg, stated on 9 April 1805 that Hölderlin's madness had worsened, that he repeatedly said "I don't want to be a Jacobin!" and that he had made serious accusations against von Sinclair. The trial finally showed that some things had been said in anger against the elector at the meeting but no actual revolution had been planned. Von Sinclair was thus released on 9 July 1805 and sent back to Homburg a free man. Soon afterwards, on 11 September 1805, Hölderlin was delivered into the clinic at Tübingen run by Dr. Johann Heinrich Ferdinand von Autenrieth.

=== Diplomacy, writing and death ===
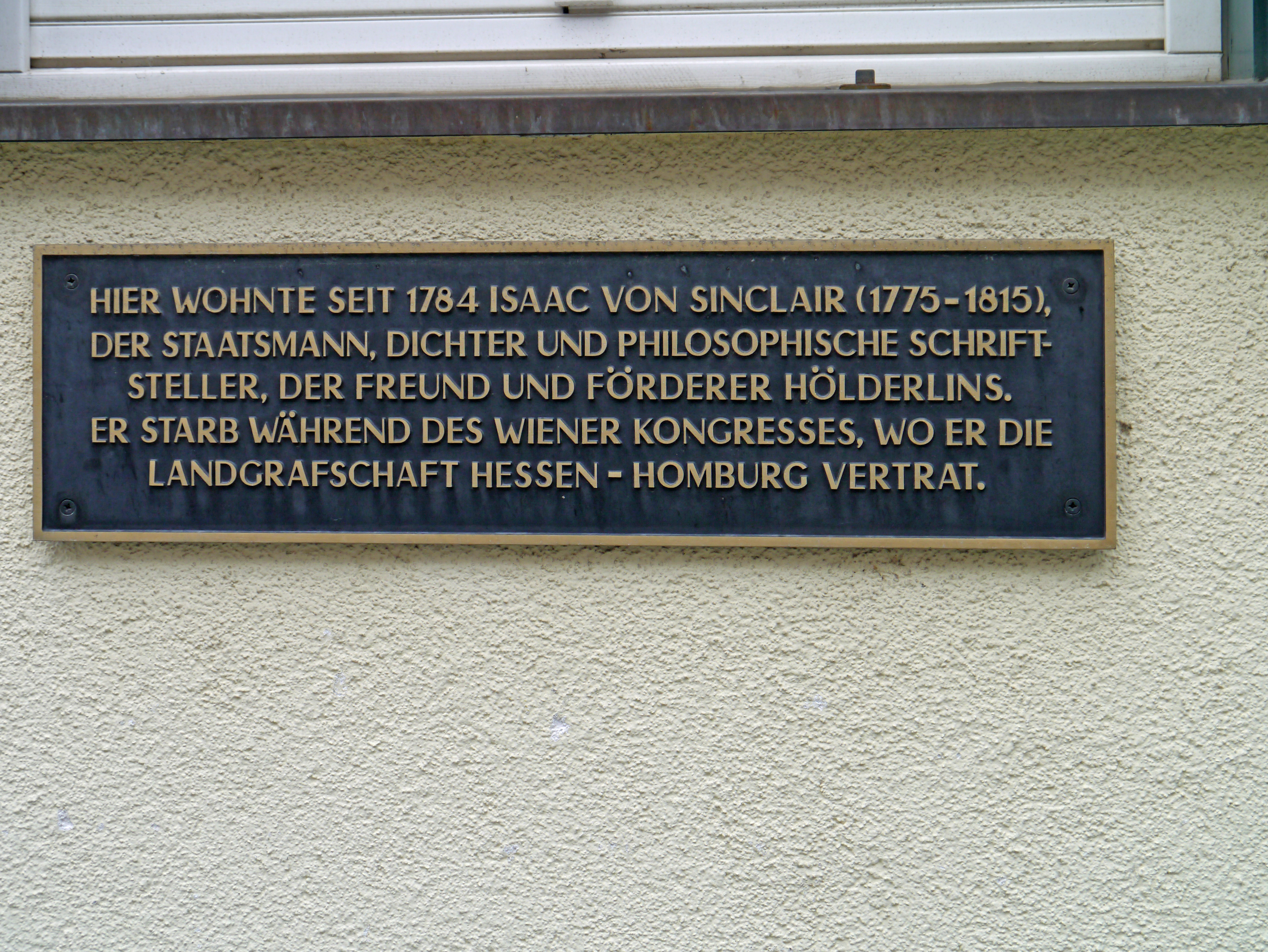
Plaque at the house Dorotheenstraße 6

Von Sinclair represented the interests of Hesse-Homburg and Frederick V on several diplomatic missions, as well as frequently chairing cabinet meetings. In late autumn 1805 he was sent to the Prussian court in Berlin and stayed with his mother in the home of Charlotte von Kalb. His enthusiasm for revolutionary ideals had already cooled and there he came into contact with anti-Napoleonic and anti-French figures. He increasingly advocated a return to the pre-revolutionary Holy Roman Empire led by the nobility. Already strained by the events of the trial, his friendship with Hölderlin also came to an end. In August 1806 von Sinclair informed Hölderlin's mother that he could no longer look after him, since Homburg was about to be mediatised. On 11 September 1806 its mediatisation was completed, upon which Hölderlin was taken to Tübingen to assist at the university hospital, then run by Johann Heinrich Ferdinand Autenrieth.

Von Sinclair also became much more active as a writer in order to express his new political ideas, contributing to journals and publishing his own poems. In 1806-07, under the pseudonym "Crisalin", he wrote a play about the Camisards' revolt against French central authority, using it as an exemplar for Germany's own struggle against Napoleon - the same theme was later also taken up by Ludwig Tieck. He also wrote two extensive philosophical works - Wahrheit und Gewißheit (Truth and Certainty) in 1811-13 and Versuch einer durch Metaphysik begründeten Physik (An Attempt at a Physics Grounded in Metaphysics) in 1813. He backed German states fighting Napoleon in 1812-1814, became increasingly religious and was also in contact with Hegel. However, von Sinclair's own poems and philosophical works gained little notice during his lifetime and were forgotten soon after his death.

It was partly down to his efforts that the state was un-mediatised at the Congress of Vienna. There he became a member of the nobility association 'Kette'. He was largely able to implement Hesse-Homburg's concerns and wished to fight in the Hundred Days against Napoleon following the latter's escape from Elba on 1 March 1815. His mother died on 20 April 1815, possibly exacerbating his own bad health - he had already suffered several strokes before 1815 and a final one on 29 April that year killed him while he was in a brothel in Vienna. The exact circumstances of his death were uncertain for a long while, since its insalubrious location necessitated a cover-up.

== Works ==
- Wahrheit und Gewißheit. Erster Band, Berlin 1811. Christoph Binkelmann (ed.), Frommann-Holzboog, Stuttgart 2015, ISBN 978-3-7728-2521-7.

== Cultural depictions ==
In her 1840 epistolary novel Die Günderode, Bettina von Arnim includes long passages about von Sinclair, calling him "St Clair".

== Bibliography (in German) ==
- BLKÖ:Sinclair, John Freiherr
- Friedrich Otto (1892). "Sinclair, Isaak v" . Allgemeine Deutsche Biographie (in German). Vol. 34. Leipzig: Duncker & Humblot. pp. 387–389.
- Werner Kirchner: Der Hochverratsprozeß gegen Sinclair. Ein Beitrag zum Leben Hölderlins. Insel, Frankfurt am Main 1969
- Ursula Brauer: Alexander Adam von Sinclaire, Die Erziehungsakten für Friedrich V. Ludwig von Hessen-Homburg. Gutachten und Berichte über eine Fürstenerziehung – Fragmente eines Fürstenspiegels (1752–1766), in: Mitteilungen des Vereins für Geschichte und Landeskunde zu Bad Homburg vor der Höhe, vol. 42 (1993), 27–92
- Ursula Brauer: Isaac von Sinclair. Eine Biographie. Stuttgart 1993 (Klett-Cotta), ISBN 3-608-91009-3.
- Ursula Brauer: Zur Vorgeschichte von Hölderlins zweitem Homburger Aufenthalt (1804–1806): Der Briefwechsel zwischen seiner Mutter und Isaac von Sinclair, in: MittVGBadHomburg 44, 1995, 65–89
- Ursula Brauer: Friedrich Hölderlin und Isaac von Sinclair. Stationen einer Freundschaft, in: Uwe Beyer, Hrsg., Hölderlin. Lesarten seines Lebens, Dichtens und Denkens, Würzburg 1997, 19–48
- Hannelore Hegel: Isaak von Sinclair zwischen Fichte, Hölderlin und Hegel. Ein Beitrag zur Entstehungsgeschichte der idealistischen Philosophie. Frankfurt am Main 1999 (2)
- Ursula Brauer (2006). "Isaac von Sinclair". In Bautz, Traugott (ed.). Biographisch-Bibliographisches Kirchenlexikon (BBKL) (in German). Vol. 26. Nordhausen: Bautz. cols. 1372–1389. ISBN 3-88309-354-8.
- Ursula Brauer (2010). "Sinclair, Isaac Freiherr von (Pseudonym Crisalin)". Neue Deutsche Biographie (in German). Vol. 24. Berlin: Duncker & Humblot. pp. 455–456. (full text online).
- Literature by and about Isaac von Sinclair in the German National Library catalogue
