= Christian Friedrich Baz =

German legal scholar

- Born: 28 October 1762; Stuttgart, Duchy of Württemberg, Holy Roman Empire
- Died: 26 May 1808 (aged 45); Waiblingen, Baden-Württemberg
- Occupation: Legal scholar

Christian Friedrich Baz (28 October 1762 – 26 May 1808) was a German legal scholar, a representative at the Duchy of Württemberg's state convention or 'Landtag' and from 1796 to 1805 mayor of Ludwigsburg. Born in Stuttgart, he supported the Age of Enlightenment and was open to French Revolutionary ideals, backing the individual freedom and rights of Württemberg's citizens. He was one of the landtag's reformers and soon became a radical and an opponent of Grand Duke Frederick. He was arrested twice and spent almost two years imprisoned in the Hohenasperg, Schloss Solitude in Stuttgart and another fortress in Bohemia. He died in 1808 in Waiblingen.

== Works ==
- Über das Petitionsrecht der wirtembergischen Landstände; für alle und zu allen Zeiten lesbar. 1797, in: Jakobinische Flugschriften aus dem deutschen Süden Ende des 18. Jahrhunderts. Herausgegeben von Heinrich Scheel, 2. Aufl. Akademie-Verlag, Berlin 1980, S.188 – 204.
- Barbara Vopelius-Holtzendorff: Das Recht des Volkes auf Revolution? Christian Friedrich Baz und die Politik der württembergischen Landstände von 1797–1800 unter Berücksichtigung von Hegels Frankfurter Schrift von 1798. in: „Frankfurt aber ist der Nabel dieser Erde“. Das Schicksal einer Generation zur Goethezeit. Herausgegeben von Christoph Jamme und Otto Pöggeler, Klett-Cotta, Stuttgart 1983, ISBN 3-608-91227-4, S. 104–134.

== Bibliography ==
- Heinrich Scheel: Süddeutsche Jakobiner. Klassenkämpfe und republikanische Bestrebungen im deutschen Süden Ende des 18. Jahrhunderts. Berlin 1962.
- Erwin Hölzle: Das Alte Recht und die Revolution. München/Berlin 1931.
- Helmut Reinalter, Axel Kuhn, Alain Ruiz: Biographisches Lexikon zur Geschichte der demokratischen und liberalen Bewegungen in Mitteleuropa. Bd. 1 (1770–1800), Peter Lang, Frankfurt am Main 1992, S. 10.
- Walter Grube: Der Stuttgarter Landtag 1457–1957. Von den Landständen zum demokratischen Parlament. Stuttgart 1957
- Michael Franz: Hölderlin und der "politische Jammer" II. Die Vorgeschichte des "Hochverratsprozesses" von 1805. Vortrag, gehalten am 3. Februar 2010 im Hölderlin-Turm in Tübingen
- Heike Harsch: Ein Kämpfer für das gute alte Recht: Christian Friedrich Baz ( 1762–1808 ). In: Hie gut Württemberg. Beilage der Ludwigsburger Kreiszeitung über Menschen, Geschichte und Landschaft unserer Heimat. Samstag, 21. Dezember 2013, Nr. 4. S. 30 – 32.
