= Max Kayser (politician) =

German politician (1853-1888)

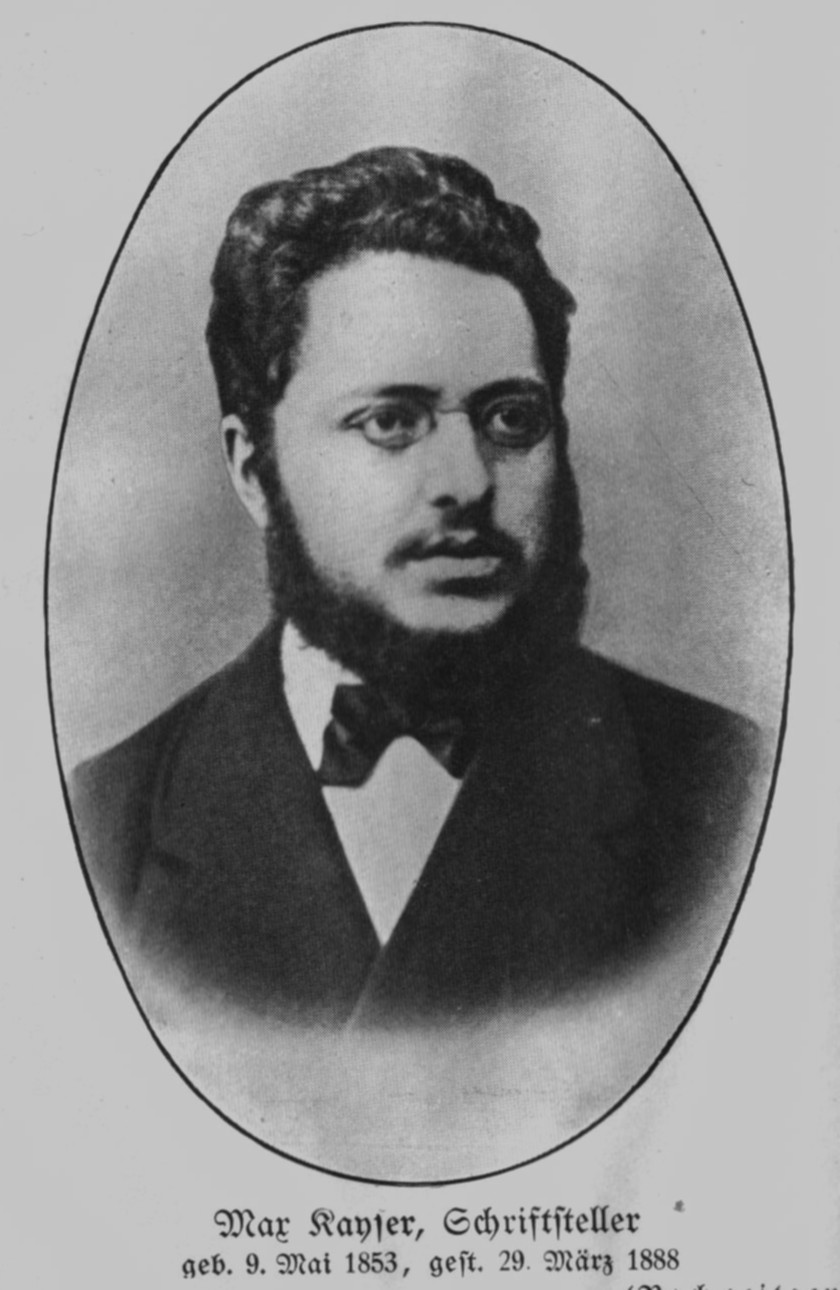
- Born: 9 May 1853; Tarnowitz, Upper Silesia, Prussia
- Died: 29 March 1888 (aged 34); Breslau (as Wrocław was then known), Lower Silesia, Prussia, Germany
- Occupations: Journalist-commentator; Office worker / Factory worker Socialist activist Member of the Reichstag; Businessman / Tobacco trader
- Political party: SDAP; SAP; SPD

Max Kayser (9 May 1853 – 29 March 1888) was a German Social Democratic political journalist-commentator and politician. Between 1878 and 1887 he served as an unusually youthful member of the German "Reichstag" ("National Parliament"). Nevertheless, between 1881 and 1884 - years during which, in parts of Germany, Bismarck's "Anti-Socialist Laws" were applied with particular enthusiasm - he was faced with a succession of court cases and excluded from a number of cities and towns, on account of his political record.

== Life ==
=== Provenance and early years ===
Max Kayser was born at Tarnowitz (as Tarnowskie Góry was known before 1944/45), a small linguistically diverse and ethnically fragmented mining town, located in a part of Upper Silesia that was part of Prussia (and later of Germany) between 1742 and 1945. Little is known of his family provenance or childhood, but the facts that he attended a "Gymnasium" (secondary school), and evidently benefited from a conventional "middle-class" school education, indicate that the family was, by the standards of those times, financially secure. He was born into a Jewish family, but subsequently identified as a so-called "religious dissident" (without a faith). On leaving school he undertook an apprenticeship in business at Breslau (as Wrocław was then known). Till 1871 he remained in Breslau, employed in wholesaling/retailing. Although he never enrolled as a university student, at least one source refers to his having attended university lectures in "National Economics" ("Nationalökonomie" / "Volkswirtschaftslehre"), an aspect of "Popular/Applied Economics" that featured in German curricula at the time. He relocated to Berlin, probably during 1871, and was briefly employed in a roller-blnd factory.

While still in Breslau, his involvement as an executive member of the city's "Business association" ("Kaufmännischer Verein") at the age of just 18 indicated a certain level of political consciousness and organisational commitment. In Berlin Kayser again demonstrated his appetite for further education, attending public lectures on "National Economics" presented by socialist economists as disparate as Eugen Dühring and Adolph Wagner. He was also a member of the executive board of the Berlin-based "Workers' Democratic League" ("Demokratische Arbeiterverein") and of the "Democratic Association" ("Demokratische Vereinigung") between 1871 and 1873. Kayser also worked, jointly with Carl Hirsch co-editor with the "Demokratische Zeitung" (newspaper) between 1871 and the publication's collapse in July 1873. Immediately after that, Kayser's contributuions began to appear in the Mainz-based "Süddeutsche Volksstimme". He also became a member of the International Workingmen's Association, possibly as early as 1869.

=== Political journalist ===
Between August 1873 and May 1874 Kayser worked for the Social Democratic Workers' Party (Note: The Social Democratic Workers' Party of Germany ("Sozialdemokratische Arbeiterpartei Deutschlands" / SDAP), which existed under this name between 1869 and 1875, was one of several precursor parties to the Social Democratic Party ("Sozialdemokratische Partei Deutschlands" / SPD), launched in 1890.) as a paid agitator. During 1874 Kaiser relocated from Berlin to Saxony: alongside his work for the short-lived "Süddeutsche Volksstimme", Kaiser he wrote for Social-Democratic newspapers printed in Chemnitz ("Freie Presse,") and Leipzig ("Vorwärts"). Possibly of greater impact were his contributions to the "Dresdner Volksbote" (rebranded and relaunched in 1877 as the "Dresdner Volkszeitung"), the principal Social Democrat newspaper of the Saxon Capital. Nevertheless, the political establishment during the Bislarck era remained deeply concerned by the rise of socialism, and while Kayser remained active as a journalists through the mid-1970s, by the time the Leipzig version of "Vorwärts" had been placed under a ban by the authorities in October 1878, most of the papers for which he wrote had either suffered, or else were undergoing, the same fate, falling foul of the Anti-Socialist Laws.

=== Party congresses ===
Kayser was a regular participant at the early social democratic "party" congresses. Between 22 and 27 May 1875 he attended the so-called Unification Congress at Gotha. This was noteworthy, in particular as the occasion on which the SDAP and the ADAV came together to form the SAP. Pressure to present a united front to the existing political establishment came both from Chancellor Bismarck's intensification of his anti-socialist strategy and from the way in which major issues that had formerly divided the two Socialist associations - most shrilly over the geographical extent of a theoretical future united German state - had been set to rest by the creation of a real united Germany in 1871. Kayser attended the Gotha congress as the delegate representing 395 party members from Dresden and, according to some sources, Pirna. Between 19 and 23 August 1876 another party congress was held at Gotha. Kayser attended. representing party members in Dresden and Pirna, as he did again in 1877. In 1883 he was again a delegate at the party congress, held between 29 March and 2 April at Copenhagen The last Party Congress which Max Kayser attended as a delegate was thate held at St. Gallen in October 1887.

=== Tobacco ===
In April 1880 he co-founded "Max Kayser & Cie.", a Tobacco and cigar business in Dresden, in which he remained active as co-owner, jointly with his brother-in-law and political ally August Kaden, till the brutal onset of his final illness in 1887.

=== Reichstag ===
At the 1878 General Election the Socialist Workers' Party, despite winning 7.6% of the popular vite, ended up with just 9 of the 397 seats distributed between the parties in the German "Reichstag" ("National Parliament"), on account of the allocation system in place at the time. One of them went to Max Kayser, who represented "Electoral District Saxony 9" ("Wahlkreis Sachsen 9"), the Freiberg and Hainichen electoral district, in a heavily industrialised region of southern Saxony.

Still aged just 26, he was the youngest in the little SADP group in the assembly, and one of the youngest members of the Reichstag. Under the terms of the Anti-Socialist Laws passed by the government in 1878 and regularly modified during the ensuing twelve years until Chancellor Bismarck reluctantly retired and the laws were not renewed, the authorities succeeded in deferring but not in preventing the political advance of what became the Social Democratic Party. Between 1881 and 1884, as one of the more prominent SAP members of the "Reichstag", Kayser found himself excluded from many German towns and cities on political grounds between 1881 and 1884. There were times when he was unable to find accommodation and was forced to spend the night in a railway wagon. He faced a number of court trials in connection with alleged breaches of press laws, in connection with which he was sentenced, in aggregate, to more than 18 months in jails.

Within the Social Democratic parliamentary group Kayser was regarded by party comrades (and other observers) as the most right-wing of their members. Karl Marx and Friedrich Engels together produced a "circular letter", addressed to the Social Democratic parliamentary leadership in which, at characteristic length, they railed against "Max Kayser's conduct in the Reichstag". At a time when the benefits of free trade were an article of faith across the traditional political left in Europe, Kayser was the only Social Democrat in the Reichstag to vote in support of the Bismarck government's programme of "protective tariffs" in 1879, explaining that although he knew tariffs would not eliminate unemployment, he believed that they might go some way to mitigate its impact. Kayser was sharply critical of the Liberals, asserting that they displayed a woeful absence of understanding when it came to Social issues and policy, concerning the working and living conditions of the so-called proletariat, urban industrial workers. He robustly rejected solution involving private insurance as a matter of principal, believing that individuals should not profit from the misfortunes of others: insurance must be a matter for the state. He used the opportunities afforded by his membership of the Reichstag to argue powerfully against the "Anti-Socialist Laws".

=== Death ===
During 1887 Kayser fell gravely sick with a throat illness which some sources identify as a cancer of the larynx. He died "as a consequence of a larynx operation" at Breslau on 30 March 1888.

Max Kayser had spent many years under close police surveillance, and his funeral celebrations followed the same pattern. As the security services looked on, more than 3,000 mourners accompanied his coffin on its slow progress along the Lohestraße to Breslau's Jewish cemetery. They included the party leaders August Bebel and Paul Singer.

== Personal ==
Max Kayser was married with at least one child: his son was also called Max Kayser. Although there are various references in sources to his family, there are few details. It is known that he had siblings. His younger brother, Richard Kayser, became a distinguished physician specialising in head and neck treatment and surgery. His business partner, August Kaden, is described in sources as his brother-in-law.
