= Verkündigung =

Die Verkündigung (German "The Annunciation") may refer to:

- Verkündigung des Herrn, episode of the life of Virgin Mary in the New Testament
- Verkündigung (Braunfels), opera by Walter Braunfels, premiered 1948
- "Verkündigung", art song by Paul Dessau
