= The Death of Empedocles (film) =

1987 film

- Directed by: Danièle Huillet and Jean-Marie Straub
- Written by: Dietrich E. Sattler; Friedrich Hölderlin (play)
- Starring: Martina Baratta
- Cinematography: Renato Berta
- Release date: February 1987
- Running time: 132 minutes
- Country: West Germany
- Language: German

The Death of Empedocles (German: Der Tod des Empedokles) is a 1987 West German drama film directed by Danièle Huillet and Jean-Marie Straub. It was entered into the 37th Berlin International Film Festival.

== Cast ==
- Martina Baratta
- Vladimir Baratta
- William Berger
- Georg Brintrup
- Howard Vernon
- Andreas von Rauch
