= Sankt Pelagiberg =

Village in Switzerland

Coordinates: 47°29′17″N 9°18′2″E

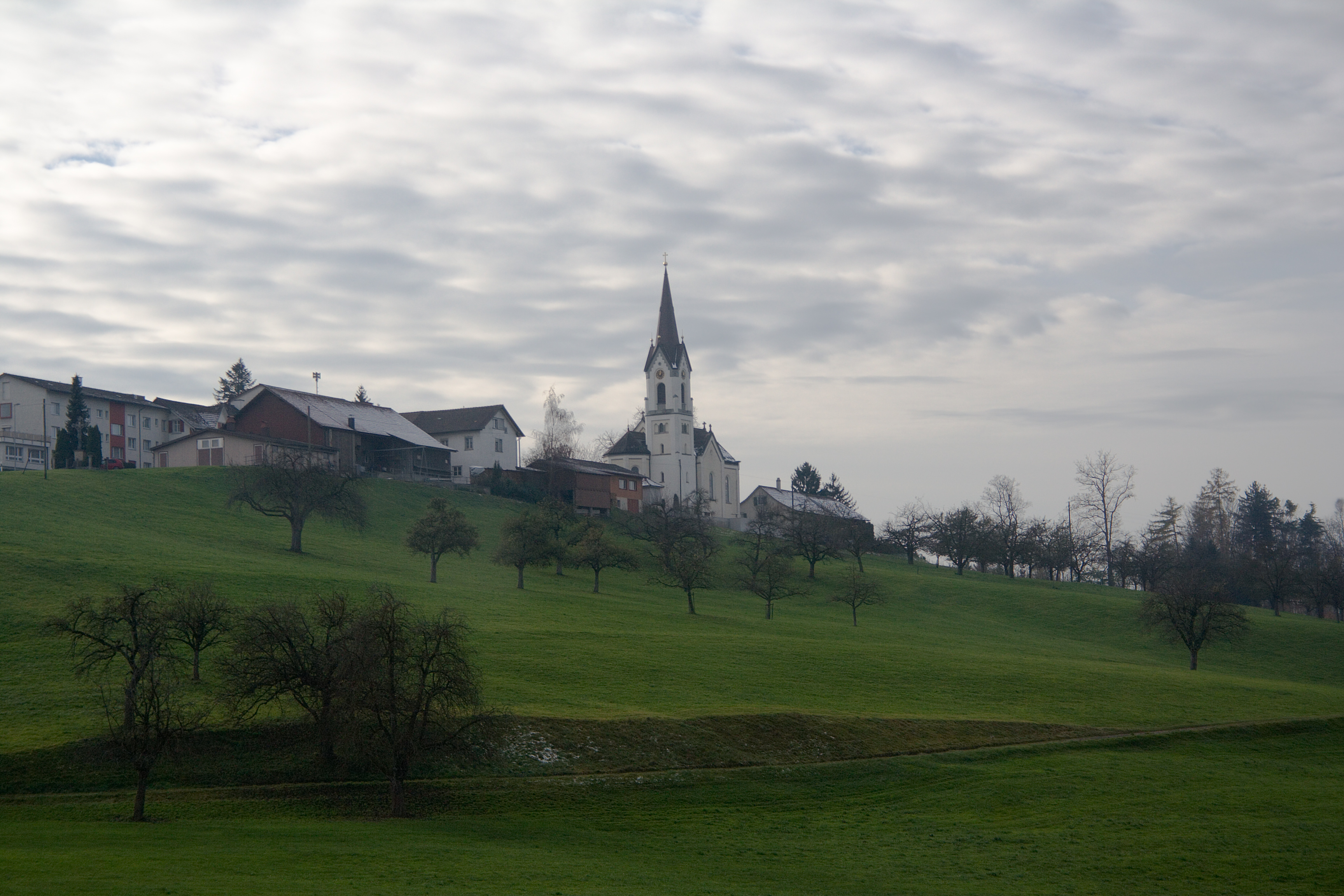
The church in St. Pelagiberg.

Sankt Pelagiberg is a village in the canton of Thurgau, Switzerland.

The village is located in the former municipality Gottshaus. In 1996, Gottshaus municipality merged with its neighbor to form a new and larger municipality, Hauptwil-Gottshaus.
