= The Death of Empedocles =

Unfinished drama by Friedrich Hölderlin

The Death of Empedocles (German: Der Tod des Empedokles) is an unfinished theatrical play by Friedrich Hölderlin. It exists in three versions written from 1797 to 1800, the first of which is the most complete. The third version was published by itself in 1826, but all three did not appear in print together until 1846, three years after Hölderlin's death.

The play is about the final days of pre-Socratic Greek philosopher Empedocles, who, according to legend, threw himself into Mount Etna. Hölderlin's main source of the story was Diogenes Laërtius's Lives and Opinions of Eminent Philosophers. The first act sees Empedocles take leave of Agrigentum, and the second is set entirely at Etna.

== In popular culture ==
In the 1979 film A Little Romance, Daniel and Lauren discuss the philosopher Martin Heidegger's fascination with Hölderlin's drama, decrying it as "terrible in any language."

Scottish musician Momus wrote and sang the song "The Death of Empedokles" for his 2016 album Scobberlotchers.

The 1987 film Der Tod des Empedokles by Jean-Marie Straub and Danièle Huillet, is a film adaptation of the Hölderlin play.
