= Landolin Ohmacht =

German sculptor

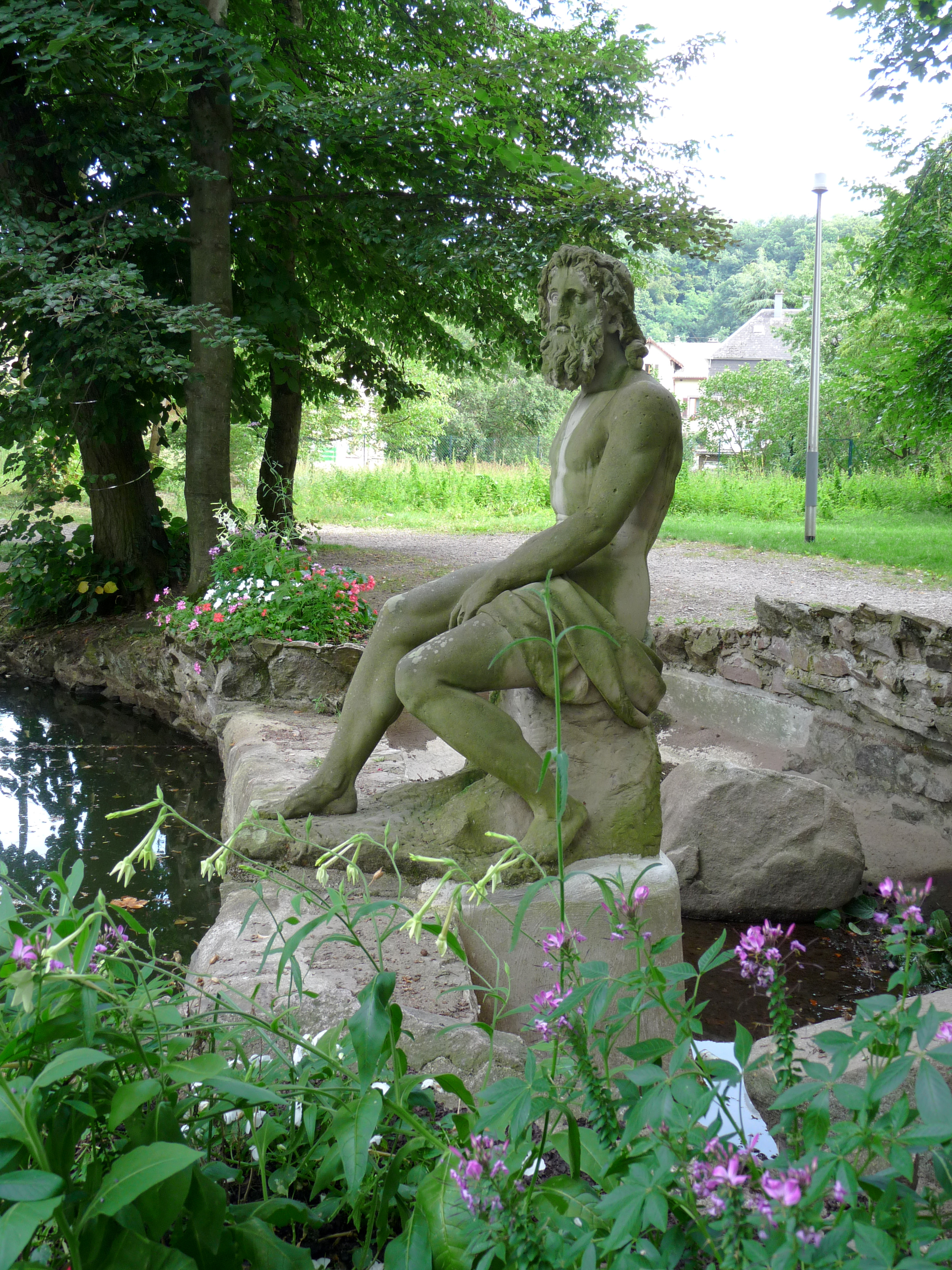
Statue of Neptune by Landolin Ohmacht, Fecht Park, Munster, Haut-Rhin

Landolin Ohmacht (11 November 1760 – 31 March 1834) was a German sculptor.

== Biography ==
Ohmacht was born in Dunningen. He worked at first as a joiner. He studied under Canova at Rome. In 1801, he settled in Strasbourg, where he lived until his death.

== Works ==
His principal works are: “The Judgment of Paris,” in the royal garden at Munich; the statue of Neptune at Münster, and that of Desaix between Kehl and Strasbourg; the mausoleum of the emperor Rudolph in the cathedral of Spa; the statue of Luther at Weissenburg, and that of “Venus leaving her Bath,” which is regarded as his masterpiece. Among his best known busts are those of Lavater, Klopstock, Raphael, and Holbein. He also sculpted the six muses adorning the façade of the Strasbourg Opera House

He also created busts of Susette Gontard and Erwin von Steinbach (see Walhalla temple) and a monument to Jean-Frédéric Oberlin in the church St. Thomas, Strasbourg.
