= Three Fantasies after Friedrich Hölderlin =

Collection of songs by György Ligeti

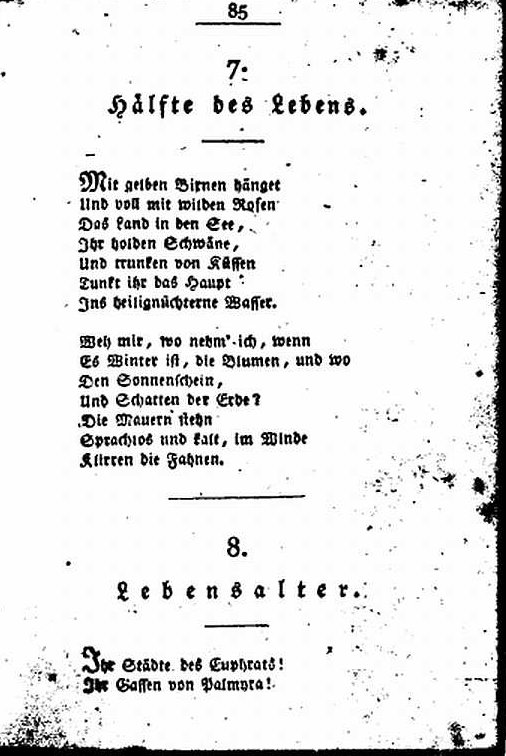
Poem by Friedrich Hölderlin, on which the first fantasy is based

Three Fantasies after Friedrich Hölderlin (German: Drei Phantasien nach Friedrich Hölderlin) is a 1982 collection of pieces for 16 voices by Hungarian composer György Ligeti. It was premiered in Stockholm on September 23, 1983, by the Swedish Radio Choir, under the baton of Eric Ericson, to whom it was dedicated. It was published by Schott Music.

== Analysis ==
The composition consists of three movements and a typical performance takes approximately 11 minutes. The movement list is as follows:

1. Hälfte des Lebens (Halfway through Life). Lento
2. Wenn aus der Ferne (If from a Distance). Andante con tenerezza
3. Abendphantasie (Evening Reverie). Maestoso – Più mosso, agitato

The piece is a polyphonic four-part work for 16 voices (that is, four each of sopranos, altos, tenors, and basses). Its compositional style is strongly influenced by Ligeti's word-painting techniques from the 60s. Here, lyrics are almost indistinguishable, so the listener is encouraged to listen to the labyrinthic ramifications of the music instead of trying to understand the content of the original poems.

Ligeti commented on this work: "My three fantasies are emotional, 'onomatopoetic', overwrought, 16-voiced pieces (not micropolyphonic!)".
