= Der Traum ein Leben (opera) =

1937 opera by Walter Braunfels

- Opera by Walter Braunfels
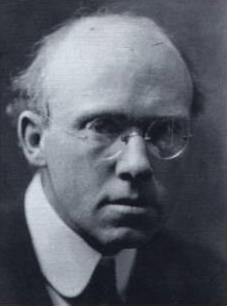
- Walter Braunfels in 1920
- Librettist: Braunfels
- Language: German
- Based on: Franz Grillparzer's play

Der Traum ein Leben, Op. 50, is a 1937 German-language opera by Walter Braunfels based on Franz Grillparzer's 1834 play of the same name. It consists of three acts and a prologue and epilogue.

The opera's scheduled premiere under Bruno Walter in Vienna in 1938 was cancelled by the Nazis following the Anschluss. It was first staged at the Theater Regensburg in 2001.

== Recordings ==
- Der Traum ein Leben – Marie-Luise Schilp, Otto von Rohr, Annelies Kupper, Heinrich Bensing, Alexander Welitsch, Orchester des Frankfurter Rundfunks, Kurt Schröder 1950
