= Der Tod fürs Vaterland =

"Der Tod fürs Vaterland" is an ode by Friedrich Hölderlin which has been set to music by Walter Braunfels, Fritz Brandt, and Carl Gerhardt. It was published in 1800.

== Lyrics ==
German	English
Du kömmst, o Schlacht! schon wogen die Jünglinge; Hinab von ihren Hügeln, hinab ins Tal, Wo keck herauf die Würger dringen, Sicher der Kunst und des Arms, doch sichrer	Thou approachest, Battle! and the youths already storm down the hills, to the valley, whence the stranglers come, sure of their arm's art, but surer
Kömmt über sie die Seele der Jünglinge, Denn die Gerechten schlagen, wie Zauberer, Und ihre Vaterlandsgesänge; Lähmen die Kniee den Ehrelosen.	the soul of the youths comes upon them, for the righteous fight, as wizards do, and their patriotic paeans paralyse the knees of the dishonoured.
O nehmt mich, nehmt mich mit in die Reihen auf, Damit ich einst nicht sterbe gemeinen Tods! Umsonst zu sterben, lieb ich nicht, doch Lieb ich, zu fallen am Opferhügel	O take me, let me join that circle, so that I will not die a common death! I do not want to die in vain; but I would love to perish on a hill of sacrifice
Fürs Vaterland, zu bluten des Herzens Blut; Fürs Vaterland – und bald ists geschehn! Zu euch, Ihr Teuern! komm ich, die mich leben Lehrten und sterben, zu euch hinunter!	for the Fatherland, to bleed the blood of my heart, for the Fatherland – and soon it is done! To you, dear ones! I come, to join those who taught me to live and to die!
Wie oft im Lichte dürstet' ich euch zu sehn, Ihr Helden und ihr Dichter aus alter Zeit! Nun grüßt ihr freundlich den geringen Fremdling, und brüderlich ists hier unten;	How oft have I, in the light, wanted to see you, you, heroes and poets from ancient times! Now you are kindly greeting the humble stranger. Here is a fraternal atmosphere;
Und Siegesboten kommen herab: Die Schlacht; Ist unser! Lebe droben, o Vaterland, Und zähle nicht die Toten! Dir ist, Liebes! nicht Einer zu viel gefallen.	And heralds of victory come down: We have won the battle! Live on high, O Fatherland, and do not count the Dead! For you, sweet one! not one too many has died.

== Background ==
The verses are nurtured by revolutionary aspirations that emerged in Hölderlin's mind after the invasion of French troops in Southern Germany in 1796.

The first draft of the ode was called "Die Schlacht" (Battle) and illustrates Hölderlin's intentions:

O Schlacht fürs Vaterland,
Flammendes blutendes Morgenrot
Des Deutschen, der, wie die Sonn, erwacht

O battle for the fatherland,
Flaming, bloody dawn
Of the German who, like the Sun, awakes,

Der nun nimmer zögert, der nun
Länger das Kind nicht ist
Denn die sich Väter ihm nannten,
Diebe sind sie,
Die den Deutschen das Kind
Aus der Wiege gestohlen
Und das fromme Herz des Kindes betrogen,

Who no longer hesitates, who no longer
Is the child,
For those who called themselves his fathers
Are thieves
Who have stolen the German's child
From his cradle
And who have betrayed the child's pious heart

Wie ein zahmes Tier, zum Dienste gebraucht.

And used it, like a domesticated animal, for their service.

Here, Hölderlin means the German Landesväter (Landesvater: father of the land), i.e. the princes, and criticizes the word and the concept as such positive terms were used in order to disguise their despotism and to keep their subjects unmündig.

For Hölderlin, the Vaterland was thus mainly a community that had to be defended by both foreign invasion and domestic tyrants, an idea based on the principles of the French Revolution, which he admired as he had written in 1792 to his sister when he told her that he "pray[s] for the French, the advocates of human rights".

The ode thus incites the German youth to start a revolutionary war of liberation: in the first two stanzas Hölderlin encourages the Jünglinge to fight the tyrannical mercenary armies of the princes that are better equipped but less motivated as they did not fight for their country but only for money. The "Vaterlandsgesängen" (patriotic paeans) he invokes are a reference to the Marseillaise which was very popular at that time, even outside France.
