= Hellmut Schnackenburg =

German conductor and music director

Hellmut Schnackenburg (27 September 1902 – 15 August 1974) was a German conductor and director of music.

== Life ==
Born in Halle (Saale), Schnackenburg grew up in Altona where he studied music. At the Cologne Opera he was répétiteur and Kapellmeister as well as music director at the Wuppertaler Bühnen from the 1920s to the 1930s.

In 1937, he became Generalmusikdirektor (GMD) of the Bremer Philharmoniker. In 1941, the Neue Zeitschrift für Musik gave a positive review of the 1941 program, and complimented him on including a thorough analysis in the program. His contract was not renewed in 1943, so he was succeeded in office by opera director Fritz Rieger. In July 1945, he was reinstated as GMD of the Philharmonische Gesellschaft. After the war, the concerts took place in the Decla cinema in Walle or in the Bremen City Hall. In 1947, the concerts could take place again in the concert hall Die Glocke. On 4 April 1948, he conducted the world premiere of Braunfels' opera Verkündigung. In 1948, he was appointed professor by the Bremen Senate and in 1951, he became director of the Musikschule Bremen. In 1953, he was succeeded by Paul van Kempen as GMD. On 4 December 1956, he premiered Carl Orff's choral work Dithyrambe. He retired as director of the music school in 1968, succeeded in this function by Hans Joachim Kauffmann.

Schnackenburg died in Bremen at the age of 71.

== Bibliography ==
- Mozart Vortrag zur 200. Wiederkehr seines Geburtstages OCLC 73627221
- Johann Sebastian Bach Werk und Persönlichkeit; ein Vortrag OCLC 257810977
