= Alpha 60 =

Swedish alternative rock band

- Origin: Uppsala, Sweden
- Genres: Alternative rock New prog Indie rock
- Years active: 2008–present
- Labels: Independent
- Members: Leonidas Aretakis; Johan Törnblom; Jon Wessling; Martin Nordkvist; Anders Aro

Alpha 60 (stylized as ALPHA 60) is an alternative rock band from Uppsala, Sweden, formed in 2008. Their name is a reference to the 1965 noir classic Alphaville; Alpha 60 being the computer controlling Godard's dystopian city. On March 1, 2012 they released their first full-length album The Rock, the Vulture and the Chain.

== History ==
The band formed in early 2008 after some of the band's current members started getting tired of just playing garage venues. After a few months of rehearsing, a steady buzz spreading through their home town, and after the joining of keyboard player Martin Nordkvist, they released the Melting Tracks EP. Having received some radio air play, the summer had them doing some Swedish festivals.

"Armour", the first music video from the band, was released on YouTube on January 16, 2012. It was directed by John R. Hallström.

On March 1, 2012 they released the band's first full-length album The Rock, the Vulture and the Chain, as well as a book of art in which artists have made interpretations of the band's songs.

== Sound ==
The band's experimental approach has led commentators to draw attention to different musical influences. Some cite the classic guitar riff styles and fascination for oriental scales and modes developed by bands like Deep Purple, Led Zeppelin and the vocal expressiveness and majestic piano arrangements of Queen as the main influences, while others focus on the energy and attitude of the modern britpop movement, the danceful rhythms and lust for experimentation of electronic music.

== Lyrical themes ==
Leonidas Aretakis has himself cited a few lyrical references, amongst others some figures in the Romantic and Neo-romantic movements, such as Friedrich Hölderlin, William Blake, Lord Byron, Rainer Maria Rilke and Georg Trakl, and the sometimes dreamlike storytelling of H.P. Lovecraft and Jorge Luis Borges. The use of mythological and literary references are common traits in the lyrics, which sometimes can be construed as dark, almost melancholic. Even though the meaning can be seen as quite opaque at times, some recurring themes include homelessness, social discontent and the search for hope in a fragmented world in the demise of "real" politics.

== Members ==
- Leonidas Aretakis – Lead vocals, guitar, songwriting
- Johan Törnblom – Backing vocals, bass
- Jon Wessling – Backing vocals, lead guitar
- Martin Nordkvist – Synthesizer, keyboard, tambourine
- Anders Aro – Drums

== Discography ==
- Melting Tracks EP - 2008
- The Rock, the Vulture and the Chain - 2012
