= Walter Braunfels =

German composer, pianist, and music educator

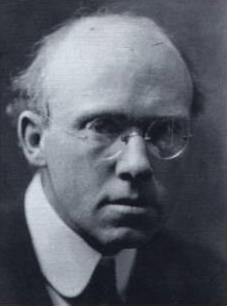
Walter Braunfels in 1920

Walter Braunfels (German pronunciation: [ˈvaltɐ ˈbʁaʊnfɛls]; 19 December 1882 – 19 March 1954) was a German composer, pianist, and music educator.

== Life ==
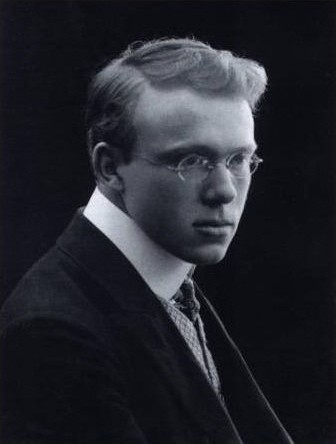
Braunfels in 1902

Walter Braunfels was born in Frankfurt. His first music teacher was his mother, the great-niece of the composer Louis Spohr. He continued his piano studies in Frankfurt at the Hoch Conservatory with James Kwast.

Braunfels studied law and economics at the university in Munich until after a performance of Richard Wagner's Tristan und Isolde he decided on music. He went to Vienna in 1902 to study with the pianist and teacher Theodor Leschetizky. He then returned to Munich to study composition with Felix Mottl and Ludwig Thuille. In February 1918 he was wounded at the front and in June 1918 on his return to Frankfurt converted from Protestantism to Catholicism, composing his Te Deum of 1920–21 "not as music for musicians but as a personal expression of faith".

He achieved early success with the melodious opera Die Vögel (The Birds, 1920), such that Adolf Hitler, not realising that Braunfels had a Jewish parent, in 1923 invited Braunfels to write an anthem for the Nazi Party, which Braunfels "indignantly turned down".

Braunfels performed as a professional pianist for many years. In 1949 he played Beethoven's Diabelli Variations on a radio broadcast. At his farewell concert as pianist on 19 January 1952, he played Bach's D major Toccata, Beethoven's piano sonata no. 32 op. 111 and the arrangement of the Organ Fantasy and Fugue in G minor by Liszt.

Braunfels was invited by Konrad Adenauer, then mayor of Cologne, to serve as the first director (and founder together with Hermann Abendroth) of the Cologne Academy of Music (Hochschule für Musik Köln) from 1925 to 1933, and again from 1945 to 1950. With the rise of the Nazis to power he was dismissed, and listed as being half-Jewish in the Nazi list of musicians composing what the regime called degenerate music. He retired from public life during the Hitler years but continued to compose. The war passed peacefully for Braunfels and his wife as they had succeeded in fleeing to Switzerland, though his three sons were conscripted into the Wehrmacht. After World War II, he returned to public life and on 12 October 1945 again became director, and in 1948 president, of the Cologne Academy of Music and further enhanced his reputation as a music educator with high ideals.

== Work as composer ==
Walter Braunfels was well known as a composer between the two world wars but fell into oblivion after his death. There has however been something of a renaissance of interest during the last thirty years. His music is in the German Classical–Romantic vein. His Phantastische Erscheinungen eines Themas von Hector Berlioz (1914) is a giant set of orchestral variations; "structurally the work has something in common with Strauss' Don Quixote, on LSD … the orchestral technique also is quite similar, recognizably German-school, with luscious writing for violins and horns, occasional outbursts of extreme virtuosity all around and a discerning but minimal use of additional percussion," noted David Hurwitz of ClassicsToday. Braunfels' opera Die Vögel, based on the play The Birds by Aristophanes, was recorded by Decca in 1994 under Lothar Zagrosek and has been revived by Los Angeles Opera (2009, under James Conlon, filmed and released on Arthaus), by Theater Osnabrück (2014) and by Bavarian State Opera (2020, under Ingo Metzmacher, filmed and streamed online). Another opera, Der Traum ein Leben, has been staged at Oper Bonn. Braunfels' 1935 Mysterium Verkündigung has been recorded twice, in 1992 by Electrola and in 2011 by BR Klassik. Braunfels also composed songs, choral works, and chamber and piano pieces. His Te Deum laudamus of 1921, Op. 32, was recorded by Manfred Honeck in 2004 for the Orfeo label. The A-Minor String Quartet of 1944 is well regarded.

== Compositions ==
=== Operas ===
- Prinzessin Brambilla Op. 12 (after E. T. A. Hoffmann) (1909)
- Ulenspiegel (1913)
- Die Vögel Op. 30 (after Aristophanes) (1913–19)
- Don Gil von den grünen Hosen, Op. 35 (1924) – based on Tirso de Molina's Don Gil of the Green Breeches
- Der gläserne Berg, Op. 39 (1929) – a Christmas fairy tale
- Galathea, Op. 40 (1929) in 1 act
- Verkündigung, Op. 50 (after Paul Claudel) (composed 1933–35, premièred NWDR Television 1948)
  - L'Annonce faite à Marie, reconstruction of the French version after Paul Claudel (2013, not premièred)
- Der Traum ein Leben, Op. 51 (1937)
- Szenen aus dem Leben der Heiligen Johanna, Op. 57 (1939–1943, premièred Stockholm 2001)
- Tanzspiel Der Zauberlehrling after the poem by Goethe, Op. 71 composed as a Ballade for television (1954). "In the television studios of Hamburg-Lokstedt there was the premiere of Der Zauberlehrling during February to music by Professor Walter Braunfels in charge of the NWDR Television."

=== Oratorios ===
- Offenbarung Johannis – Revelation of John Op. 17 (1919)
- Te Deum Op. 32 (1920–21)
- Große Messe, Op. 37 (1923–26)
- Passionskantate, Op. 54 (1936–43)
- Das Spiel von der Auferstehung des Herrn – Resurrection play, Op. 72 (1954) after the Alsfelder Passionsspiel, arranged by Hans Reinhart (Anon. 2015)

=== Selected other works ===
- Variations on an Old French Children's Song, Op. 15 (1909)
- Ariels Gesang, Op. 18 (1910, after Shakespeare's The Tempest)
- Serenade, Op. 20 (1910)
- Piano Concerto, Op 21 (1912)
- Phantastiche Erscheinungen eines Themas von Hector Berlioz (Fantastic Appearances of a Theme by Hector Berlioz), Op. 25 (1914–17)
- Don Juan Variations for Orchestra, Op. 34 (1924)
- Prelude and Fugue for large orchestra, Op. 36 (1922–35)
- Organ Concerto, Op. 38 (1927)
- Two Choruses for Male Choir, Op. 41 (1925)
- Schottische Fantasie for Viola and Orchestra, Op. 47 (1933)
- Die Gott minnende Seele Song Cycle, Op. 53 (1936)
- The Death of Cleopatra, Op. 59 (1944) Scene for Soprano and Orchestra
- Music (Sinfonia Concertante) for Violin Solo, Viola Solo, 2 Horns and String Orchestra, Op. 68 (1948)
- Sinfonia brevis in F minor, Op. 69 (1948)
- Hebriden-Tänze for Piano & Orchestra, Op. 70 (1951)
- "Der Tod fürs Vaterland", ode by Friedrich Hölderlin, Op. 27 (1916–1918)

=== Chamber works and solo ===
- String Quartet No. 1 in A minor, Op. 60 (1944)
- String Quartet No. 2 in F Major, Op. 61 (1944)
- String Quintet in F sharp minor, Op. 63 (1944)
- String Quartet No. 3, Op. 67 (1947)
