= Gottshaus =

Village and former municipality in Switzerland

Coordinates: 47°29′21″N 9°17′21″E

Gottshaus is a village and former municipality in the canton of Thurgau, Switzerland.

It was first recorded somewhere between year 1250 and 1300 as Gottshaus.

The municipality also contained the village Sankt Pelagiberg as well as 40 others. It had 781 inhabitants in 1850, which went up and down over the years to 676 in 1900, 798 in 1950, 707 in 1980 and 811 in 1990.

In 1996 the municipality was merged with the neighboring municipality Hauptwil to form a new and larger municipality Hauptwil-Gottshaus.
