= Hauptwil-Gottshaus =

- Municipality
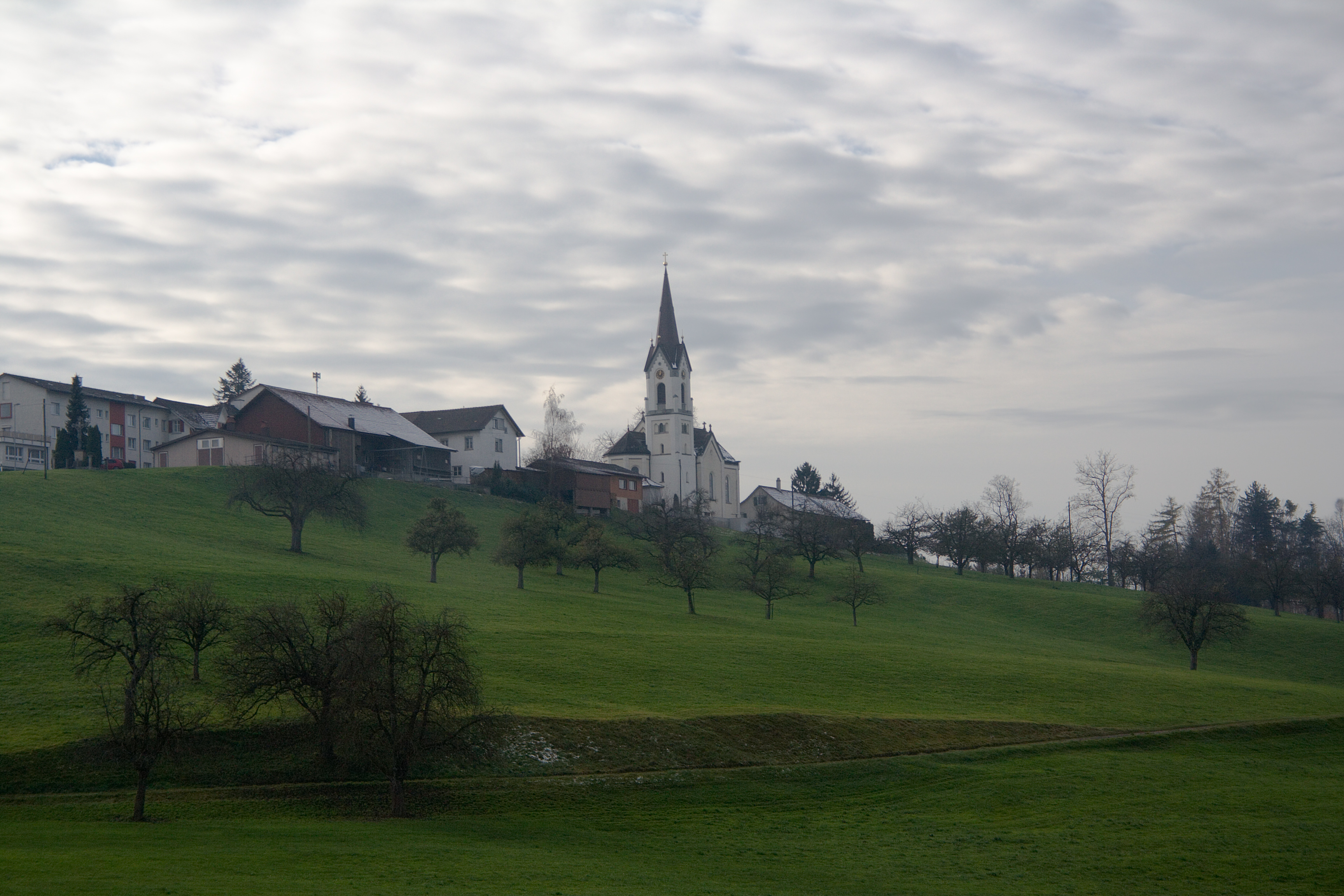
- Hauptwil-Gottshaus village and St. Pelagiberg Church

- Coat of arms
- Location of Hauptwil-Gottshaus
- Location within Switzerland Location within Canton of Thurgau
- Coordinates: 47°28′N 9°17′E
- Country: Switzerland
- Canton: Thurgau
- District: Weinfelden

Area
  - Total: 12.49 km^{2} (4.82 sq mi)
- Elevation: 550 m (1,800 ft)

Population (December 2007)
  - Total: 1,802
  - Density: 144.3/km^{2} (373.7/sq mi)
- Time zone: UTC+01:00 (CET)
  - Summer (DST): UTC+02:00 (CEST)
- Postal code: 9213
- SFOS number: 4486
- ISO 3166 code: CH-TG
- Localities: Eberswil, Gottshaus, Hauptwil, St. Pelagiberg, Stocken, Trön, Wilen
- Surrounded by: Bischofszell, Häggenschwil (SG), Muolen (SG), Waldkirch (SG), Zihlschlacht-Sitterdorf
- Website: www.hauptwil.ch

Hauptwil-Gottshaus is a municipality in Weinfelden District in the canton of Thurgau in Switzerland.

The municipality was created in 1996 by a merger of Hauptwil and Gottshaus.

The Wakker Prize was bestowed on Hauptwil in 1999 for the preservation of its architectural heritage.

== History ==
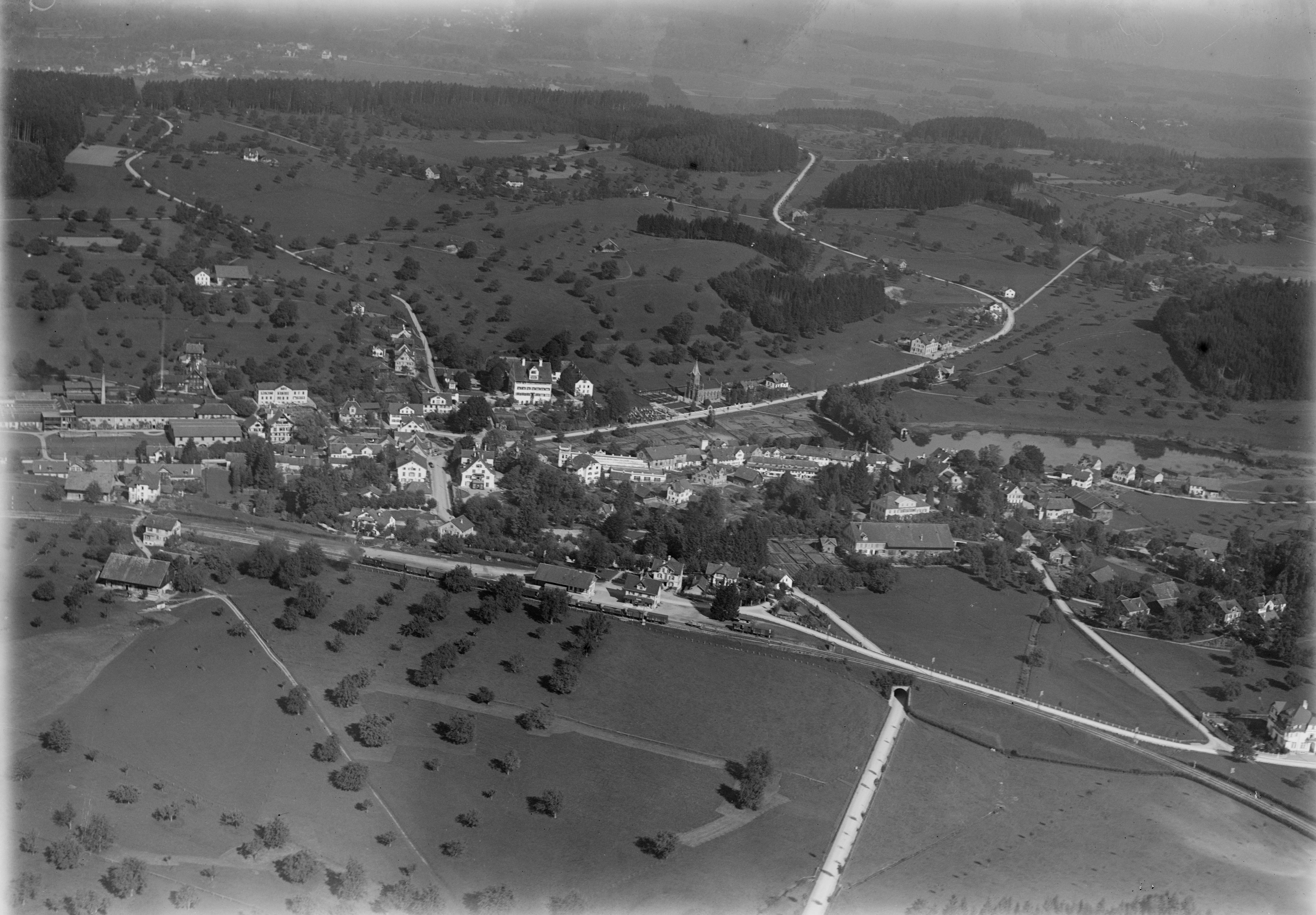
Aerial view by Walter Mittelholzer (1923)

Hauptwil was first mentioned in 1413 as Hoptwill. Gottshaus was first mentioned in the second half of the 13th century.

=== Hauptwil ===
By no later than 1377 Hauptwil was part of the fief granted by the Bishop of Constance and the Abbey of St. Gall to Welter von Blidegg of the Ryff family. In 1561 it went to the Freiherr von Hallwyl. Then, between 1664 and 1798 it was owned by the Gonzenbach family, who by 1600 already owned several properties and held the low justice right in Hauptwil.

The Catholic part of the population has always belonged to the parish of Bischofszell. Reformed services were held at the castle chapel by 1667 by the Gonzenbach family for the village. The Reformed chapel became a filial church to the parish church in Bischofszell in 1861. Then, in 1886 a Reformed church was built in the village. The Brunschweiler family, who owned a large factory in town, were active in the early 19th-century Evangelical Baptist movement, which they encouraged to grow in the town. In 1880 about 10% of the inhabitants belonged to this church, and currently there is still a Bund Freier Evangelischer Gemeinde (a type of free church) community in Hauptwil

The Gonzenbach family had made their money in the textile industry, so after their arrival, the farming village evolved into a textile producing factory settlement. The industrialization was beneficial by providing wages and easy access to water power (five artificial ponds were built). In 1664 Hauptwil was given the right to hold a market. The Castle was built in 1664-65, and in 1661-71 approximately forty new manufacturing buildings and worker housing were built. At the end of the 18th century, the Brunschweiler family of Erlen settled in Hauptwil. During a stagnation in the textile industry, they built up the dyeing industry in the village.

The opening of the railway line Sulgen-Gossau in 1876 further expanded the local economy. Next to the textile industry in importance, agriculture remained important in the village. Towards the end of the 19th century, the village made the transition from orchards and crops to livestock and dairy farming. The first dairy was built in 1909. Since the Brunschweiler Dyeing Factory ceased operations in 1984, Zetag AG operates the only textile production factory in the area. The construction of single family homes in the 1970s stopped the emigration of families from Hauptwil. It is now characterized by well-preserved old buildings and the now converted industrial landscape of the 17th to 19th Centuries and in 1999 was awarded the Wakker Prize.

=== Gottshaus ===
The farms of Gottshaus were likely part of the grants given to the Abbey of St. Pelagius in Bischofszell in the 9th century by the Bishop of Constance Salomo I/Solomon I. From the Middle Ages until 1798 Pelagi-Gottshaus formed a lower court in the bailiwick of Bischofszell.

The chapel was built in 1486 and belonged to the parish of Bischofszell. In 1535, during the Counter-Reformation, it became a pilgrimage church. In 1726 it came under the authority of the monastery. In 1908 the eastern part of the municipality split off to form the Catholic community of St. Pelagiberg.

A weir was built on the river in 1430 by the Abbey and served in the 17th-19th Centuries to provide the textile industry in Hauptwil with power. Since 1946 this weir has been under government protection and preservation. Agriculture is still the most important activity in the village.

== Geography ==
Hauptwil-Gottshaus has an area, as of 2009, of 12.49 square kilometers (4.82 sq mi). Of this area, 8.82 km^{2} (3.41 sq mi) or 70.6% is used for agricultural purposes, while 2.35 km^{2} (0.91 sq mi) or 18.8% is forested. Of the rest of the land, 0.88 km^{2} (0.34 sq mi) or 7.0% is settled (buildings or roads), 0.34 km^{2} (0.13 sq mi) or 2.7% is either rivers or lakes and 0.1 km^{2} (25 acres) or 0.8% is unproductive land.

Of the built up area, industrial buildings made up 4.0% of the total area while housing and buildings made up 0.2% and transportation infrastructure made up 0.2%. while parks, green belts and sports fields made up 2.3%. Out of the forested land, 15.9% of the total land area is heavily forested and 2.9% is covered with orchards or small clusters of trees. Of the agricultural land, 62.1% is used for growing crops, while 8.5% is used for orchards or vine crops. Of the water in the municipality, 1.5% is in lakes and 1.2% is in rivers and streams.

The municipality was created in 1996 when Gottshaus and Hauptwil merged. It includes the village of Hauptwil, Gottshaus, the settlement around the church of St. Pelagiberg and about 40 farm houses and hamlets.

== Demographics ==
Hauptwil-Gottshaus has a population (as of December 2020) of 2,017. As of 2008, 10.5% of the population are foreign nationals. Over the last 10 years (1997–2007) the population has changed at a rate of 10%. Most of the population (as of 2000) speaks German (95.4%), with Serbo-Croatian being second most common (1.6%) and Italian being third (1.1%).

As of 2008, the gender distribution of the population was 51.4% male and 48.6% female. The population was made up of 825 Swiss men (45.5% of the population), and 106 (5.8%) non-Swiss men. There were 798 Swiss women (44.0%), and 84 (4.6%) non-Swiss women.

In 2008 there were 17 live births to Swiss citizens and 2 births to non-Swiss citizens, and in same time span there were 12 deaths of Swiss citizens and 1 non-Swiss citizen death. Ignoring immigration and emigration, the population of Swiss citizens increased by 5 while the foreign population increased by 1. There was 1 Swiss man, 1 Swiss woman who emigrated from Switzerland to another country, 15 non-Swiss men who emigrated from Switzerland to another country and 14 non-Swiss women who emigrated from Switzerland to another country. The total Swiss population change in 2008 (from all sources) was a decrease of 24 and the non-Swiss population change was an increase of 25 people. This represents a population growth rate of 0.1%.

The age distribution, as of 2009, in Hauptwil-Gottshaus is; 209 children or 11.7% of the population are between 0 and 9 years old and 246 teenagers or 13.8% are between 10 and 19. Of the adult population, 243 people or 13.6% of the population are between 20 and 29 years old. 243 people or 13.6% are between 30 and 39, 296 people or 16.5% are between 40 and 49, and 251 people or 14.0% are between 50 and 59. The senior population distribution is 162 people or 9.1% of the population are between 60 and 69 years old, 83 people or 4.6% are between 70 and 79, there are 46 people or 2.6% who are between 80 and 89, and there are 10 people or 0.6% who are 90 and older.

As of 2000, there were 639 private households in the municipality, and an average of 2.8 persons per household. In 2000 there were 279 single family homes (or 80.2% of the total) out of a total of 348 inhabited buildings. There were 30 two family buildings (8.6%), 9 three family buildings (2.6%) and 30 multi-family buildings (or 8.6%). There were 388 (or 20.3%) persons who were part of a couple without children, and 1,132 (or 59.1%) who were part of a couple with children. There were 94 (or 4.9%) people who lived in single parent home, while there are 7 persons who were adult children living with one or both parents, 6 persons who lived in a household made up of relatives, 23 who lived in a household made up of unrelated persons, and 126 who are either institutionalized or live in another type of collective housing. The vacancy rate for the municipality, in 2008, was 2.2%.

As of 2007, the construction rate of new housing units was 1.7 new units per 1000 residents. In 2000 there were 742 apartments in the municipality. The most common apartment size was the 6 room apartment of which there were 173. There were 32 single room apartments and 173 apartments with six or more rooms. As of 2000 the average price to rent an average apartment in Hauptwil-Gottshaus was 993.06 Swiss francs (CHF) per month (US$790, £450, €640 approx. exchange rate from 2000). The average rate for a one-room apartment was 600.00 CHF (US$480, £270, €380), a two-room apartment was about 587.60 CHF (US$470, £260, €380), a three-room apartment was about 731.54 CHF (US$590, £330, €470) and a six or more room apartment cost an average of 1393.39 CHF (US$1110, £630, €890). The average apartment price in Hauptwil-Gottshaus was 89.0% of the national average of 1116 CHF.

In the 2007 federal election the most popular party was the SVP which received 45.05% of the vote. The next three most popular parties were the CVP (16.33%), the FDP (12.45%) and the Green Party (7.1%). In the federal election, a total of 554 votes were cast, and the voter turnout was 43.2%.

The historical population is given in the following chart:

== Heritage sites of national significance ==
The Former Tavern Zur Traube, Hauptwil Castle and the Tortürmli are listed as Swiss heritage site of national significance. The entire village of Hauptwil is part of the Inventory of Swiss Heritage Sites.

== Economy ==
As of 2007, Hauptwil-Gottshaus had an unemployment rate of 1.92%. As of 2005, there were 184 people employed in the primary economic sector and about 63 businesses involved in this sector. 212 people are employed in the secondary sector and there are 38 businesses in this sector. 201 people are employed in the tertiary sector, with 45 businesses in this sector.

In 2000 there were 1,343 workers who lived in the municipality. Of these, 675 or about 50.3% of the residents worked outside Hauptwil-Gottshaus while 151 people commuted into the municipality for work. There were a total of 819 jobs (of at least 6 hours per week) in the municipality. Of the working population, 9.5% used public transportation to get to work, and 50.9% used a private car.

== Religion ==
From the 2000 census, 836 or 43.7% were Roman Catholic, while 719 or 37.6% belonged to the Swiss Reformed Church. Of the rest of the population, there are 37 individuals (or about 1.93% of the population) who belong to the Orthodox Church, and there are 61 individuals (or about 3.19% of the population) who belong to another Christian church. There were 42 (or about 2.19% of the population) who are Islamic. There are 3 individuals (or about 0.16% of the population) who belong to another church (not listed on the census), 169 (or about 8.83% of the population) belong to no church, are agnostic or atheist, and 47 individuals (or about 2.46% of the population) did not answer the question.

== Education ==
The entire Swiss population is generally well educated. In Hauptwil-Gottshaus about 73.1% of the population (between age 25-64) have completed either non-mandatory upper secondary education or additional higher education (either university or a Fachhochschule).

== See also ==
- Hauptwil railway station
