= Ludwigsburger Kreiszeitung =

German daily newspaper

- Type: Daily newspaper
- Publisher: Ungeheuer + Ulmer KG GmbH + Co.
- Editor-in-chief: Ulrike Trampus
- Editor: Gerhard Ulmer
- Founded: 1818; 208 years ago
- Circulation: 33,706 (as of Monday to Saturday)
- Website: www.lkz.de

The Ludwigsburger Kreiszeitung (LNC) is a German-language daily newspaper printed and distributed in the district of Ludwigsburg.

== History ==
The Ludwigsburger Kreiszeitung began its publication on 1 July 1818 as the Ludwigsburger Wochenblatt.

== Circulation ==
As of February 2019, the Ludwigsburger Kreiszeitung's circulation is 33,706.
