= Susette Gontard =

Person

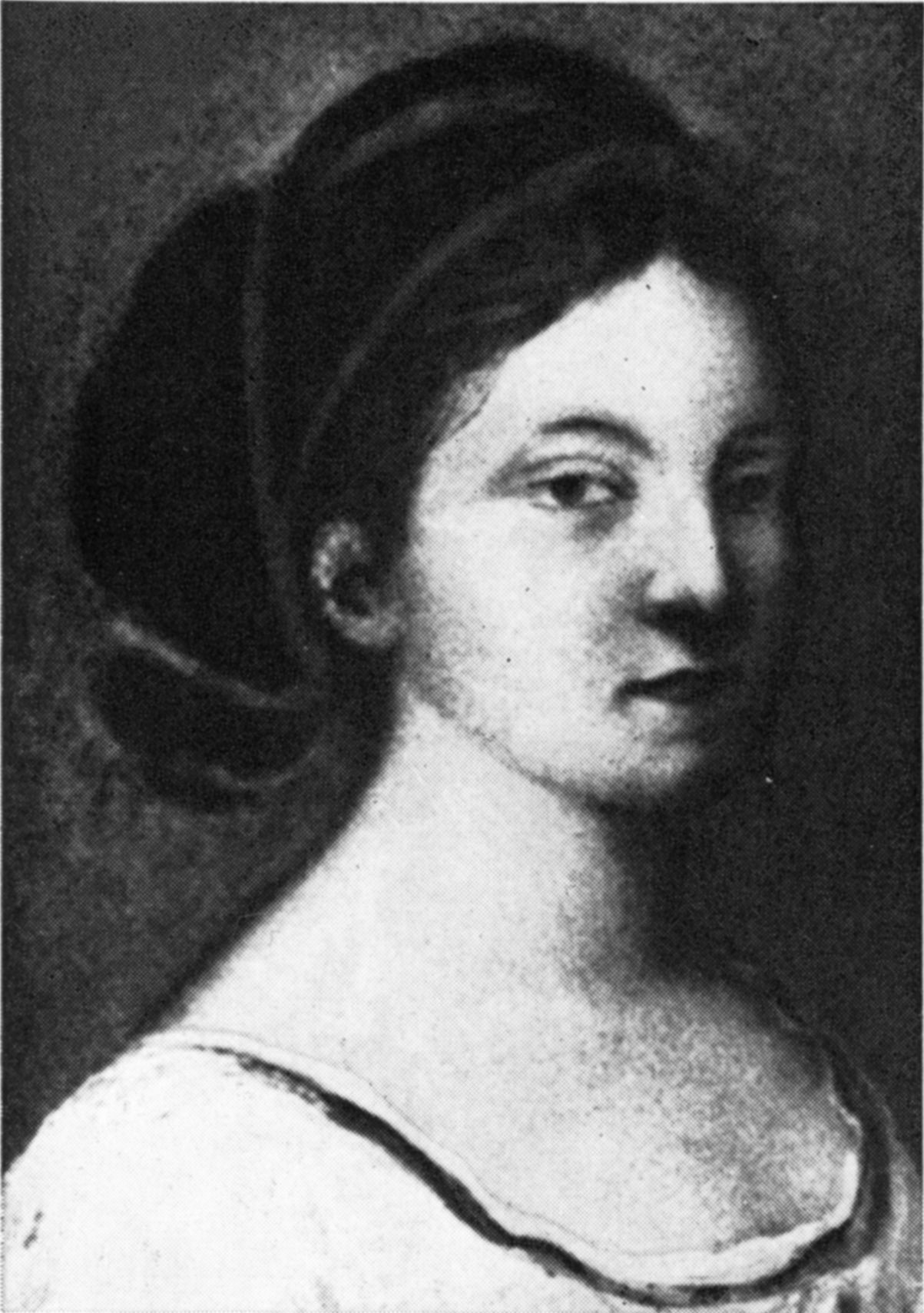
Gontard by Elisabeth Sömmering

Susette Gontard (née Borkenstein; (c. 9 February 1769, Hamburg – 22 June 1802, Frankfurt), dubbed Diotima by the German poet Friedrich Hölderlin after Diotima of Mantinea, was the inspiration for Hölderlin's novel Hyperion, published in 1797–1799. She was the wife of Frankfurt banker Jakob Friedrich Gontard, Hölderlin's employer. It is generally believed that Hölderlin's passion for her contributed to his descent into insanity. Hölderlin and Gontard exchanged a large number of letters, which were preserved and published in many works.

Susette Gontard married textile merchant Jakob Friedrich Gontard at the age of seventeen. Four busts of her were made by sculptor Landolin Ohmacht, one of which is currently on display at the Liebieghaus in Frankfurt.
