= Verkündigung (Braunfels) =

Opera by Walter Braunfels

- Opera by Walter Braunfels
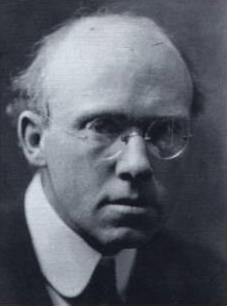
- Walter Braunfels in 1920
- Librettist: Braunfels
- Language: German
- Based on: Paul Claudel's L'Annonce faite a Marie
- Premiere: 4 April 1948; Cologne Opera

Verkündigung ("Annunciation") is a 1935 mystery opera (ein Mysterium) in a prologue and four acts by Walter Braunfels to the composer's own libretto after the German translation of Paul Claudel's L'Annonce faite a Marie. Claudel's play tells the story of a woman, Violaine, who moved by pity kisses a leper and contracts leprosy herself, but heals the leper she had embraced. Violaine also brings back to life the child born to her sister Mara and Jacques, the man who betrayed her, and then dies herself. The names of Claudel's characters are germanified so the father Andre Vercors becomes Andreas Gradherz, Pierre de Craon becomes Peter von Ulm, and so on. The opera was premiered on 4 April 1948 in Cologne, conducted by Hellmut Schnackenburg, with Trude Eipperle as Violaine.

== Roles ==
Roles, voice types, premiere cast
Role	Voice type	Premiere cast, 4 April 1948 Conductor: Hellmut Schnackenburg
Andreas Gradherz, Violäne's father	bass-baritone	Gerhard Göschel
Violäne's mother	alto	Irmgard Gerz
Violäne	soprano	Trude Eipperle
Mara, Violäne's sister	soprano	Walburga Wegner
Jakobäus, Violäne's former fiance, Mara's husband	baritone	Felix Knäpper
Peter von Ulm	tenor	Wilhelm Otto
Peter von Ulm's assistant	tenor	Karl Schiebener
Voice of an angel	soprano	Elisabeth Urbaniak
First worker	bass	Anton German
Schulze von Rothenstein	speaking role	Heinz Froitzheim

== Recordings ==
- Verkündigung – Andrea Trauboth (Violaine), Chieko Shirasaka-Teratani (Mara), Siegmund Nimsgern (Andreas Gradherz), Claudia Rüggeberg (the mother), John Bröcheler (Jacobaeus), Christer Bladin (Peter von Ulm). Köln SO & Chor, Dennis Russell Davies 1992
- Verkündigung – Juliane Banse (Violaine), Janina Baechle (Mara), Robert Holl (the father), Hanna Schwarz (the mother), Adrian Eröd (Jacques), Chor des Bayerischen Rundfunks, Münchner Rundfunkorchester, Ulf Schirmer 2014
