= Eric Santner =

American scholar (born 1955)

- Born: 1955 (age 70–71)

Academic background
- Education: University of Texas at Austin (PhD)
- Thesis: The Poetry of Shards: Paratactic Composition in the Later Poems of Friedrich Hölderlin (1984)

Academic work
- Era: Contemporary philosophy
- Region: Western philosophy
- Institutions: University of Chicago

Eric Lawrence Santner (born 1955) is an American scholar. He is Philip and Ida Romberg Professor in Modern Germanic Studies, and Chair, in the Department of Germanic Studies, at the University of Chicago, where he has been based since 1996. A graduate of Oberlin College in 1977, Santner received his doctorate at the University of Texas at Austin, in 1984, then going on to teach at Princeton University.

Santner's writing covers literature, psychoanalysis, religion, and philosophy. It deals with German poetry, post-war Germany, and the Holocaust. His 2001 book On the Psychotheology of Everyday Life: Reflections on Freud and Rosenzweig tackles the question of religious tolerance using the work of the Jewish religious philosopher Franz Rosenzweig.

== Works ==
- Friedrich Hoelderlin: Narrative Vigilance and the Poetic Imagination (1986)
- Stranded Objects: Mourning, Memory and Film in Postwar Germany (1990)
- My Own Private Germany: Daniel Paul Schreber's Secret History of Modernity (1996)
- On the Psychotheology of Everyday Life: Reflections on Freud and Rosenzweig (2001)
- Catastrophe and Meaning: The Holocaust and the Twentieth Century (2003) editor with Moishe Postone.
- The Neighbor: Three Inquiries in Political Theology (2005) with Slavoj Žižek and Kenneth Reinhard
- On Creaturely Life: Rilke, Benjamin, Sebald (2006)
- The Royal Remains: The People's Two Bodies and the Endgames of Sovereignty (2011)
- The Weight of All Flesh: On the Subject-Matter of Political Economy (2015)
