= Hauptwil =

Village and former municipality in the canton of Thurgau, Switzerland

Coordinates: 47°28′N 9°17′E

Hauptwil is a village and former municipality in the canton of Thurgau, Switzerland.

It was first recorded in year 1413 as Hoptwill.

The municipality had 50 inhabitants in 1649, which increased to 598 in 1850, 741 in 1900, 819 in 1950 and 910 in 1990.

In 1996 the municipality was merged with the neighboring municipality Gottshaus to form a new and larger municipality Hauptwil-Gottshaus.
