= Demokratische Zeitung =

German newspaper (1871–72)

Demokratische Zeitung (English: Democratic Newspaper) was a daily newspaper published from Berlin between 1 October 1871 and 31 March 1872. The paper was founded by Johann Jacoby and had a democratic and republican orientation. The newspaper was edited by J. Voigt, K. Hirsch and C. Lübeck. Prominent contributors included Temme, M. Friedlander, C. Lübeck, W. Spindler and G. Spauer.
