= Rothenhausen =

Village in Thurgau, Switzerland

- Former municipality
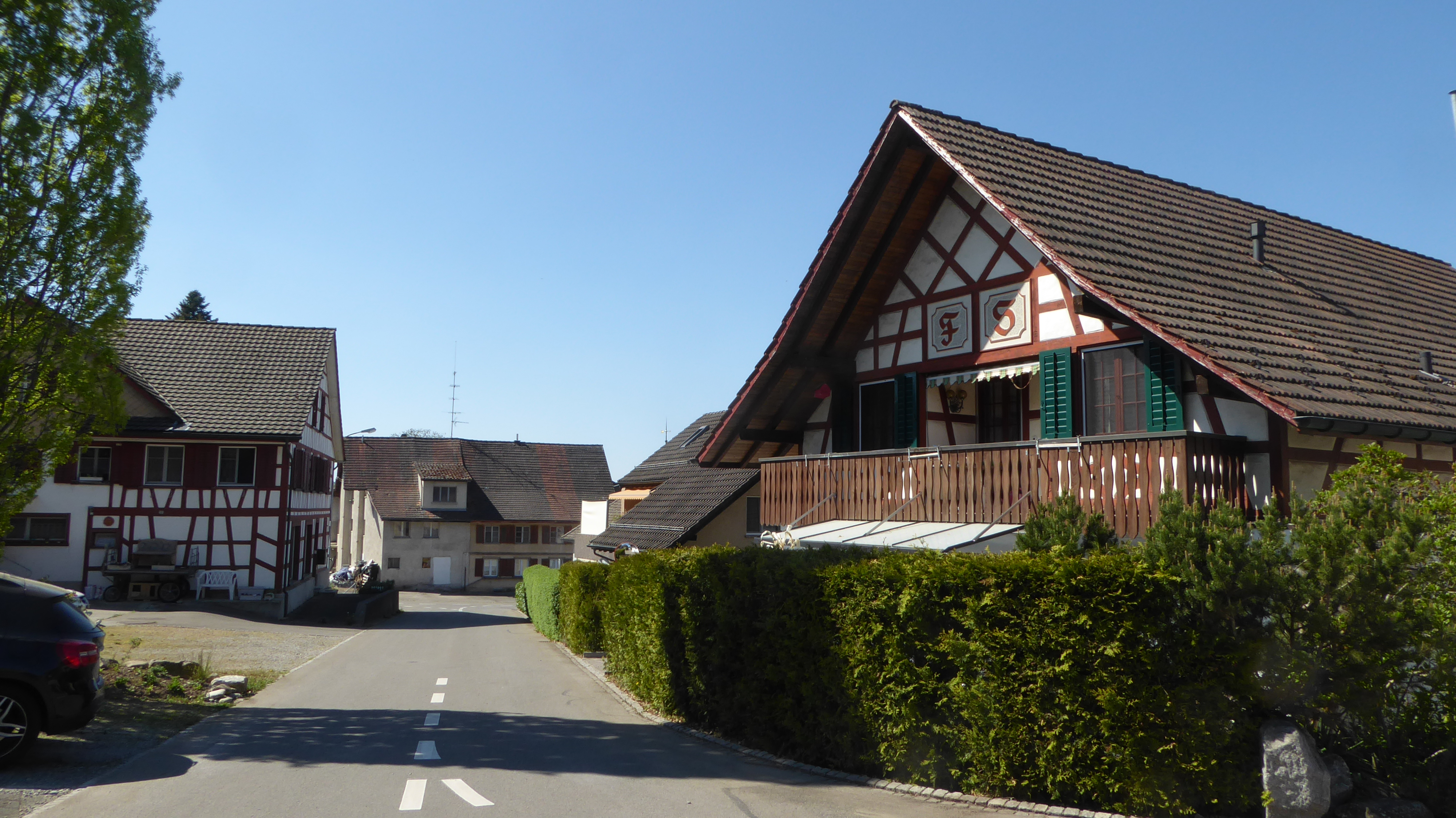
- Location of Rothenhausen
- Location within Switzerland Location within Canton of Thurgau
- Coordinates: 47.5512°N 9.1025°E
- Country: Switzerland
- Canton: Thurgau
- District: Weinfelden
- Municipality: Bussnang

Population (1990)
  - Total: 317
- Time zone: UTC+01:00 (CET)
  - Summer (DST): UTC+02:00 (CEST)
- ISO 3166 code: CH-TG
- Website

Rothenhausen is a former Ortsgemeinde (local commune) in the canton of Thurgau, Switzerland, which has been part of the municipality of Bussnang in the district of Weinfelden since 1996. From 1803 to 1995 the Ortsgemeinde belonged to the Munizipalgemeinde (municipal commune) of Bussnang. It comprised the village of Rothenhausen, on the main road from Weinfelden to Wil south of the Thur, the neighboring hamlet of Puppikon, and Thurrain, at the crossing of the Thur that has existed since Roman times.

== History ==
Rothenhausen is first mentioned in 857 as Rotenhuson. In the early Middle Ages the Abbey of Saint Gall owned property and rights there. The village and the hamlet were subject to the barons of Bussnang until 1435; afterwards, until 1798, Rothenhausen shared the fate of the lordship of Weinfelden (low court of Bussnang-Rothenhausen). Until 1798 Puppikon belonged partly to the lordship of Bürglen (low court of Mettlen), partly to Weinfelden and partly to the free court (Freigericht) of Thurlinden. Rothenhausen always belonged to the parish of Bussnang. In 1474 the village received an Offnung (record of customary law).

In the early modern period mainly grain was grown under the three-field system, with some viticulture; from the middle of the 19th century livestock and dairy farming and fruit growing were increasingly practiced. A cheese dairy was set up in 1865. Land improvement (Melioration) was carried out on the Ried (marshland) in 1921, and land consolidation from 1941 to 1945. A zoning plan and building regulations were drawn up in 1966. Small knitwear factories were established in the 20th century.

Rothenhausen had 238 inhabitants in 1850, 268 in 1900, 303 in 1950 and 317 in 1990.

== Bibliography ==
- Thurgauer Zeitung, 6 January 1976 (supplement)
- H. Lei, Rothenhausen, 1992
