= Friltschen =

Village in Thurgau, Switzerland

- Former municipality
- Location of Friltschen
- Location within Switzerland Location within Canton of Thurgau
- Coordinates: 47.54°N 9.0862°E
- Country: Switzerland
- Canton: Thurgau
- District: Weinfelden
- Municipality: Bussnang

Population (1990)
  - Total: 185
- Time zone: UTC+01:00 (CET)
  - Summer (DST): UTC+02:00 (CEST)
- ISO 3166 code: CH-TG
- Website

Friltschen is a former Ortsgemeinde (local commune) in the canton of Thurgau, Switzerland, now part of the municipality of Bussnang in the district of Weinfelden. Formed in 1812, the Ortsgemeinde belonged to the Munizipalgemeinde (municipal commune) of Bussnang until 1996. It consisted of the villages of Friltschen and Weingarten, which lie away from the main roads from Weinfelden and Bürglen to Wil, and the hamlet of Wart.

== History ==
Friltschen is first mentioned in 865 as Fridolteshova. In the Middle Ages the monasteries of St. Gall and Kalchrain and the commandery of Tobel owned property there. The fortification north of Friltschen has not been investigated. Until 1798 all of Friltschen and most of Weingarten belonged to the Hohe Gerichte (high courts) and were therefore subject to the Confederate bailiff (Landvogt) in Thurgau for both high and low justice. Wart and the smaller part of Weingarten were part of the lordship of Bürglen (low court of Mettlen). In church matters the area always shared the fate of Bussnang.

Grain growing under the three-field system and viticulture were practiced originally; in the 19th century farming shifted to livestock and dairy farming. From 1870 to 1920 there were many home embroiderers (Heimsticker). A factory for special children's shoes operated from 1923 to 1960. Since 1965 Letrona AG has built transmitter masts and housings in Friltschen; in 2002 it had 90 employees there and in Rümlang.

Friltschen had 230 inhabitants in 1850, 224 in 1900, 252 in 1950 and 185 in 1990.

== Bibliography ==
- Thurgauer Zeitung, 6 January 1976 (supplement); 21 July 1990
- Friltschner + Lanterswiler Post, 1992, no. 8
