= Oberbussnang =

Village in Thurgau, Switzerland

- Former municipality
- Oberbussnang from the south-west

- Coat of arms
- Location of Oberbussnang
- Location within Switzerland Location within Canton of Thurgau
- Coordinates: 47.5504°N 9.0882°E
- Country: Switzerland
- Canton: Thurgau
- District: Weinfelden
- Municipality: Bussnang

Population (1990)
  - Total: 116
- Time zone: UTC+01:00 (CET)
  - Summer (DST): UTC+02:00 (CEST)
- ISO 3166 code: CH-TG
- Website

Oberbussnang is a former Ortsgemeinde (local commune) in the canton of Thurgau, Switzerland, now part of the municipality of Bussnang in the district of Weinfelden. From 1803 to 1995 it belonged to the former Munizipalgemeinde (municipal commune) of Bussnang. The Ortsgemeinde comprised the farming village of Oberbussnang, on the Furtbach and on the main road from Weinfelden to Wil, and the hamlets of Margenmühle and Neuberg.

== History ==
Oberbussnang is first mentioned in 857 as duobus Bussenanc. In the early Middle Ages the Abbey of Saint Gall owned property in Oberbussnang. In 1293 the tithe rights passed from St. Gall to Feldbach, or more precisely to Konrad von Oehningen; part of them came to the commandery of Tobel in 1339 and all of them in 1677. Oberbussnang always belonged to the lordship of Bürglen and to the low court of Mettlen. In church matters it has shared the fate of Bussnang since the early Middle Ages.

The inhabitants grew grain under the three-field system and cultivated vines, and they had no common land (Allmend). From 1620 the Einzugsbrief (charter on the admission of newcomers) regulated settlement in the village, and from 1622 the Offnung (record of customary law) regulated life within the village community. At Margenmühle the inn closed in 1915, the mill in 1920 and the sawmill in 1928.

Oberbussnang had 248 inhabitants in 1850, 226 in 1900, 180 in 1950 and 116 in 1990.

== Bibliography ==
- H. Lei, Oberbussnang, 1990
