= Istighofen =

Former municipality in Thurgau, Switzerland

Coordinates: 47°32′30″N 9°08′51″E

- Former municipality
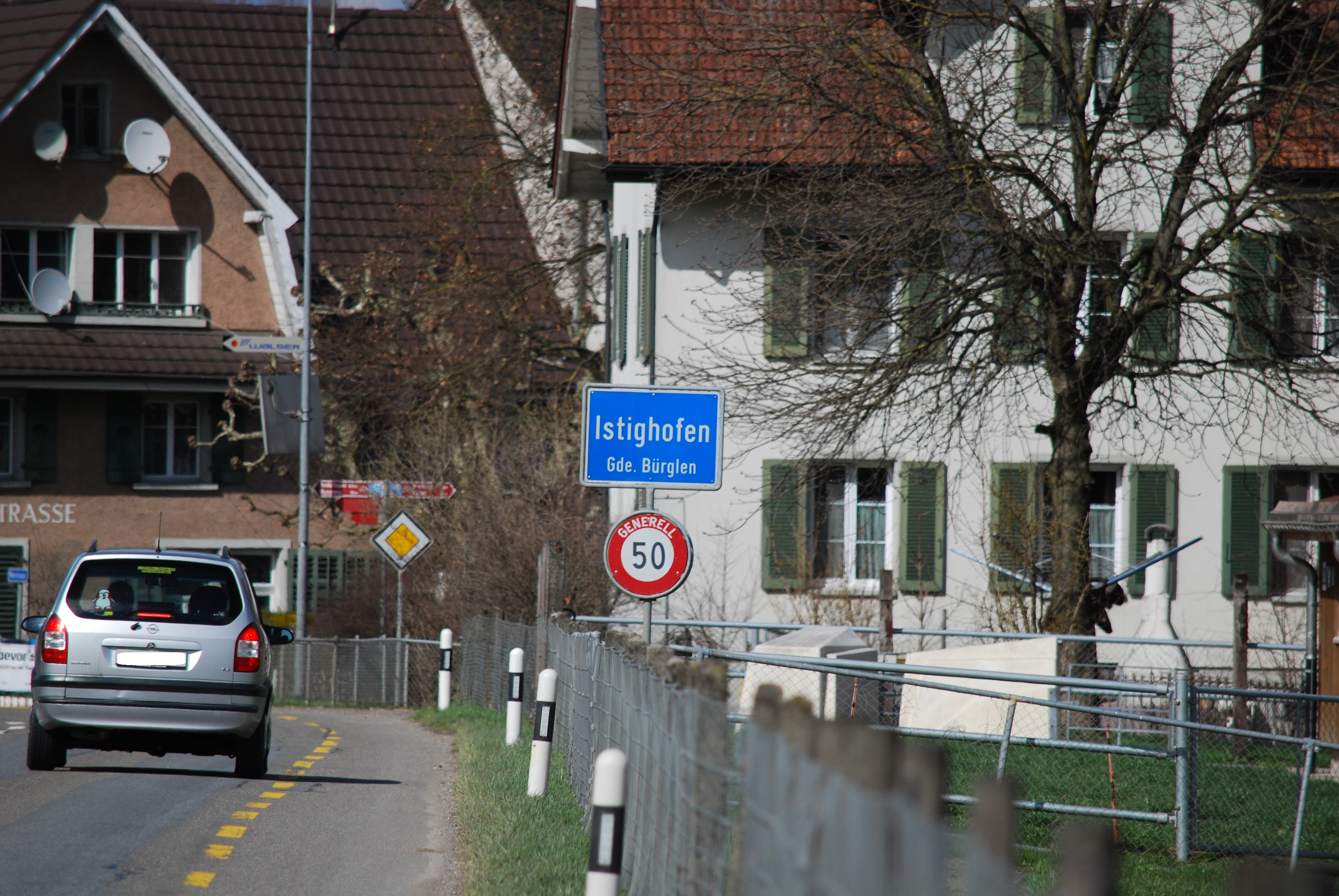
- Interactive map of Istighofen
- Country: Switzerland
- Canton: Thurgau
- District: Weinfelden
- Municipality: Bürglen

Population (1990)
  - Total: 449

Istighofen is a former municipality (Ortsgemeinde) and an Ortschaft of the municipality of Bürglen, in the district of Weinfelden, canton of Thurgau, Switzerland. From 1816 to 1995 it formed part of the Munizipalgemeinde of Bussnang. It lies halfway between Konstanz and Wil and consists of the village of Istighofen, where a bridge crosses the Thur, together with the hamlet of Moos.

== History ==
Istighofen is first attested in 832 as Justineshova, and the Abbey of Saint Gall held lands there in the early Middle Ages. From the late Middle Ages until 1798, its low court covered Unterbuhwil, Niederbuhwil, part of Moos, and Hosenruck and was subject to the lordship of Bürglen; the presidency of the court alternated between Istighofen and Buhwil. In religious matters the village belonged to the parish of Werthbühl, which remains the case for Catholics today, while Protestants worshipped at Bussnang from 1529 and at Bürglen from 1865.

The local economy was based on cereal farming in a three-year crop rotation with a little viticulture, joined from the mid-19th century by livestock, dairy farming, and fruit growing. A bridge over the Thur replaced the ferry in 1837.

Drawing on the clay deposits of Istighofen and Mettlen, the local tile and brick works was acquired in 1908 by Jakob Schmidheiny & Co. of Heerbrugg, which folded it into its eastern Swiss brickworks, and in 1941 by the Zürcher Ziegeleien. It employed 240 people in 1989 and 85 in 2004. The population was 200 in 1850, 186 in 1900, 241 in 1950, and 449 in 1990.

== Bibliography ==
- H. Ausderau, Geschichte der alten Thurbrücke Bürglen-Istighofen Thurgau, 1936
- Thurgauer Zeitung, 6 January 1976 (suppl.); 27 February 2002
- R. Gentsch, Istighofen dazumal, 1991
- E. Menolfi, Bürglen, 1996
- Abegg, Regine; Erni, Peter, Zwischen Bodensee und Bürglen, 2018, pp. 245–248 (Die Kunstdenkmäler des Kantons Thurgau, 9)
