= Oppikon =

Former commune in Thurgau, Switzerland

- Former municipality
- Unteroppikon
- Location of Oppikon
- Location within Switzerland Location within Canton of Thurgau
- Coordinates: 47.5522°N 9.062°E
- Country: Switzerland
- Canton: Thurgau
- District: Weinfelden
- Municipality: Bussnang

Population (1990)
  - Total: 142
- Time zone: UTC+01:00 (CET)
  - Summer (DST): UTC+02:00 (CEST)
- ISO 3166 code: CH-TG
- Website

Oppikon is a former Ortsgemeinde (local commune) in the canton of Thurgau, Switzerland, which has been part of the municipality of Bussnang in the district of Weinfelden since 1996. From 1803 to 1995 the Ortsgemeinde belonged to the Munizipalgemeinde (municipal commune) of Bussnang. It consisted of the outlying hamlets of Unteroppikon, Oberoppikon, Eppenstein and Schmidshof.

== History ==
Uuirinchoua, mentioned in 827 and possibly in 822 and 830, is identified by researchers with the later Schmidshof; the name Oppikon is recorded in 1352. In the High Middle Ages the area lay within the sphere of influence of the barons of Bussnang and of Griesenberg. The castle (Burgsäss) of the lords of Eppenstein, who are recorded in 1324, was destroyed by the Appenzellers in 1407. From 1435 Oberoppikon and Eppenstein belonged to the lordship of Weinfelden, within the low court of Bussnang-Rothenhausen. The smaller part of Unteroppikon belonged to the lordship of Griesenberg; the larger part was a Hohes Gericht (high court) and was therefore subject to the Confederate bailiff (Landvogt) in Thurgau for both high and low justice. Schmidshof belonged to the lordship of Tobel until 1798, to the Munizipalgemeinde of Zezikon, together with Oberoppikon, from 1798 to 1803, and from 1803 to 1862 to the Ortsgemeinde of Zezikon within the Munizipalgemeinde of Affeltrangen. In church matters the area always shared the fate of Bussnang. The hamlets have largely kept their farming character to this day.

Oppikon had 128 inhabitants in 1850, 194 in 1900, 177 in 1950 and 142 in 1990.

== Bibliography ==
- Die Thurgauer Gemeinden und ihre Wappen, 1988, pp. 242 f.
- H. Matthey, Zezikon, 1991, pp. 99 f.
