= Stehrenberger =

Stehrenberger is a surname of Swiss-German origin, originating in Affeltrangen and Friltschen.

== People with the surname ==
- Akiko Stehrenberger (born 1978), American designer
- Paul Stehrenberger (1938–2024), Swiss footballer

== See also ==
- Sternberger
