= Lanterswil =

Village in Thurgau, Switzerland

- Former municipality
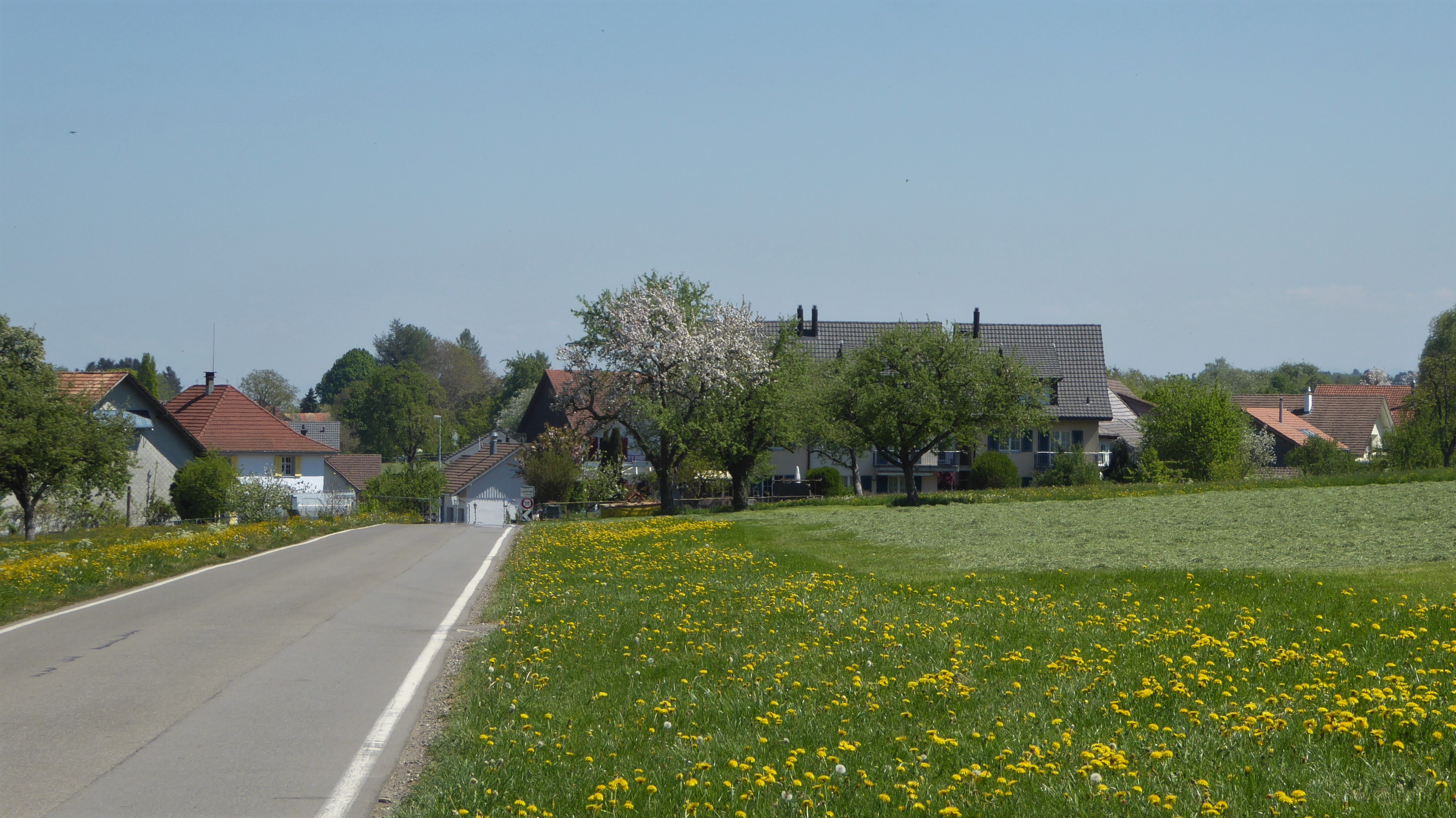
- Lanterswil from the west
- Location of Lanterswil
- Location within Switzerland Location within Canton of Thurgau
- Coordinates: 47.522°N 9.0971°E
- Country: Switzerland
- Canton: Thurgau
- District: Weinfelden
- Municipality: Bussnang

Population (1990)
  - Total: 146
- Time zone: UTC+01:00 (CET)
  - Summer (DST): UTC+02:00 (CEST)
- ISO 3166 code: CH-TG
- Website

Lanterswil is a former Ortsgemeinde (local commune) of the Munizipalgemeinde (municipal commune) of Bussnang in the canton of Thurgau, Switzerland. Since 1996 it has been part of the municipality of Bussnang in the district of Weinfelden. The Ortsgemeinde consisted of three settlements lying close together on the gentle northern slope of the Braunauer Berg: Lanterswil with Neuhof and Kirchbühl, Niederhof, and Stehrenberg.

== History ==
Lanterswil is first mentioned in 1272 as Landretiswiller. Until 1798 the whole area belonged to the Hohe Gerichte (high courts) and was therefore subject to the Confederate bailiff (Landvogt) in Thurgau for both high and low justice. In church matters Lanterswil always shared the fate of Bussnang.

Grain was grown under the three-field system, alongside viticulture; in the 19th century farming shifted to livestock and dairy farming (cheese dairy of Lanterswil-Toos in 1879). The village has kept its farming character to this day.

Lanterswil had 251 inhabitants in 1850, 199 in 1900, 166 in 1950 and 146 in 1990.

== Bibliography ==
- Thurgauer Zeitung, 6 January 1976 (supplement); 20 July 1990
