= Reuti (Bussnang) =

Village in Thurgau, Switzerland

- Former municipality
- Location of Reuti
- Location within Switzerland Location within Canton of Thurgau
- Coordinates: 47.5446°N 9.1239°E
- Country: Switzerland
- Canton: Thurgau
- District: Weinfelden
- Municipality: Bussnang

Population (1990)
  - Total: 122
- Time zone: UTC+01:00 (CET)
  - Summer (DST): UTC+02:00 (CEST)
- ISO 3166 code: CH-TG
- Website

Reuti is a former Ortsgemeinde (local commune) in the canton of Thurgau, Switzerland, which has been part of the municipality of Bussnang in the district of Weinfelden since 1996. From 1803 to 1995 the Ortsgemeinde belonged to the Munizipalgemeinde (municipal commune) of Bussnang. It comprised the farming village of Reuti and the small church village of Wertbühl, about 2 km (1.2 mi) away, south of the Thur.

== History ==
From the High Middle Ages until 1798 Reuti and Wertbühl belonged to the low court of Mettlen and to the lordship of Bürglen. In church matters Reuti was always part of Wertbühl, where the Catholics remained in the parish even after the Reformation. From 1529 the few Reformed inhabitants attended neighboring churches, to which they were permanently assigned in the 19th century: those of Reuti to Bussnang, those of Wertbühl to Bürglen.

Grain was grown under the three-field system, alongside viticulture; from the middle of the 19th century livestock and dairy farming and fruit growing increased. Reuti has kept its farming character.

Reuti had 134 inhabitants in 1850, 101 in 1900, 116 in 1950 and 122 in 1990.

== Bibliography ==
- Thurgauer Zeitung, 6 January 1976 (supplement)
- Tagblatt, 16 October 2004
