= Brenda Mäder =

Swiss politician (born 1986)

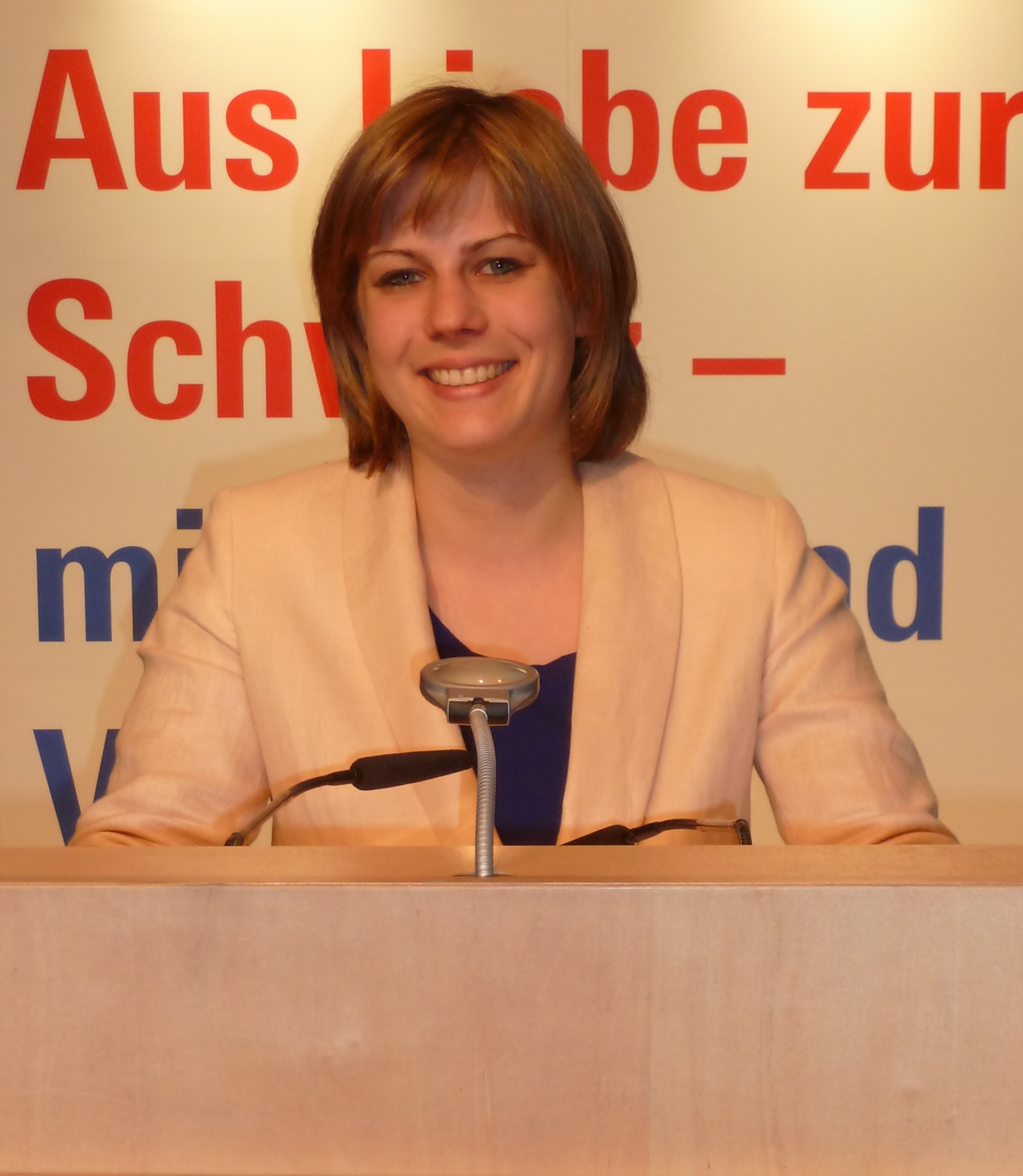

Brenda Mäder (born 24 April 1986) is a Swiss politician (FDP), formerly President of the Young Liberals (Switzerland)

== Life ==
Mäder grew up in Weinfelden, a town in Thurgau, Switzerland. After reaching the matura at the grammar school in Frauenfeld in 2004, she studied business economics at the University of St. Gallen and attained a bachelor's degree in 2007. During that time she spent a semester abroad at the University of Economics, Prague. In 2008 Brenda Mäder started her master studies at the University of St. Gallen and was awarded a master's degree in April 2011. Between 2010 and 2011 she worked for the Thurgauer Kantonalbank in Weinfelden. Since January 2012 she has worked as a consultant in an international strategy consultancy.

== Politics ==
From 2008 to April 2011 she was member of the managing board of the Young Liberals (Switzerland) and Young Liberals Thurgau. In 2009 she became vice-president of the Young Liberals Switzerland. In February 2010 to April 2012 she was president of the Young Liberals Switzerland. At the same time Mäder was also member of the party executive committee for FDP Switzerland and for FDP Thurgau.

Mäder gained national attention as a co-initiator the successful referendum against fixed book prices in early 2012. She was also active in the initiative committee of the 'No Billag' initiative and appeared prominently in the referendum's youth campaign as a proponent of lowering the conversion rate.

She was a candidate for the National Council (Switzerland) in 2011 Swiss federal election. In 2012 Mäder was a candidate for the Grand Council of Thurgau and got the first replacement place for the FDP in the Weinfelden District.

Together with Simon Scherrer, President of the Young Liberals of the City of St. Gallen, and Silvan Amberg from Zurich, former President of the FDP's gay organization, she founded the independent liberal movement up! The organisation was founded on June 18, 2014. Brenda Mäder withdrew shortly afterwards due to professional commitments and time spent abroad.

Mäder has been a member of the FDP district 7/8 in Zurich since 2023.
