= Reuti =

Reuti may refer to:

- Reuti (Bussnang), a part of the municipality of Bussnang, Thurgau, Switzerland
- Reuti (Hasliberg), a village in the municipality of Hasliberg, Bern, Switzerland
