= Zürcher Ziegeleien =

Swiss brick and tile manufacturer

Zürcher Ziegeleien AG
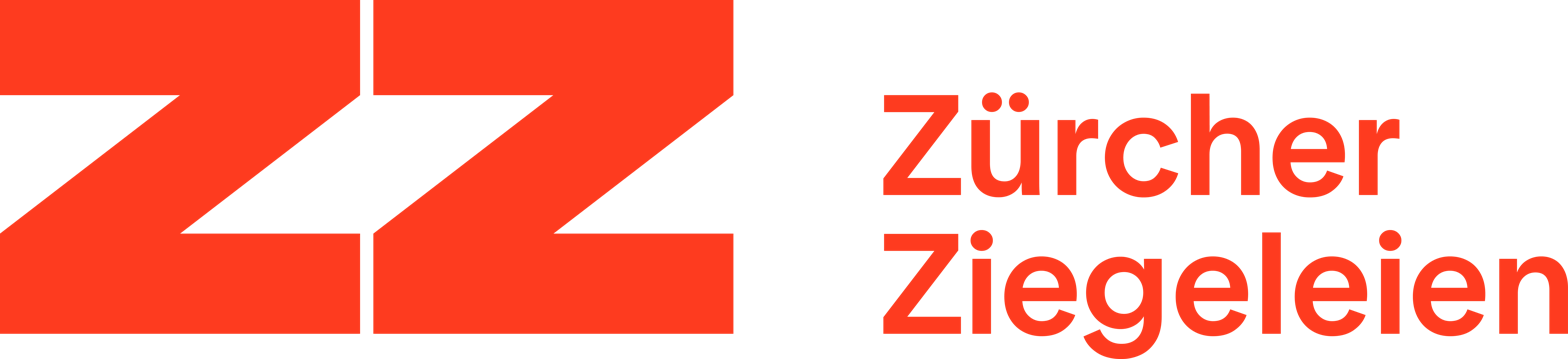
- Type: Joint-stock company
- Industry: Building materials
- Founded: 1912
- Headquarters: Regensdorf, Switzerland
- Products: Roof tiles, bricks, facade tiles, photovoltaic modules
- Parent: Swisspor (from 2020)

Zürcher Ziegeleien AG (ZZ) is a Swiss manufacturer of clay building materials, headquartered in Regensdorf. With plants in Laufen and Istighofen, it produces roof tiles, bricks, facade tiles, and photovoltaic modules. The company traces its origins to a 1912 merger of Zürich brickworks; it became the largest brick producer in Switzerland and grew into an industrial conglomerate before its construction business was separated from the rest of the group at the end of the 1990s.

== History ==
In 1912 the Mechanische Backsteinfabrik, founded in 1861, merged with the Albishof-Heurieth AG, which had been formed in 1905 from two other mechanical brickworks, to create the Zürcher Ziegeleien. The company was listed on the stock exchange but was shaped by the Schmidheiny family, who operated brick factories in Eastern Switzerland. Through the merger of these works with the Zürcher Ziegeleien between 1932 and 1941, the firm became the largest brick producer in Switzerland. Its product range expanded to include concrete goods, insulation materials, and lightweight building blocks.

In 1962 the Zürcher Ziegeleien controlled 14 companies, produced in 30 plants, and employed around 2,250 people. From 1980 the company diversified beyond construction and developed into an industrial mixed conglomerate.

In the late 1990s the difficult building market led to a decision to separate the building-materials business from the rest of the group. The name Zürcher Ziegeleien was dropped in 1998, when the construction business began trading as ZZ Wancor AG; the remaining conglomerate was later renamed Conzzeta AG and continued as a separate industrial group.

In 1999 the Austrian Wienerberger AG took over ZZ Wancor and integrated it into the group, together with the heavy-ceramics division of the Tonwarenfabrik Laufen and the concrete producer ZZ Prebeton. In 2000 the company left the city of Zürich for a new headquarters in Regensdorf. Production was subsequently concentrated at the two plants in Laufen and Istighofen, with other sites closed; membership of the Wienerberger group also opened new markets abroad, particularly in Scandinavia, for which the facade tile "Urban" was developed, alongside the photovoltaic products "zzsunstar biuno" and "Unitas".

After more than twenty years as a Wienerberger subsidiary, the company was acquired in 2020 by the Swiss Swisspor group, and in 2021 it returned to the historic name Zürcher Ziegeleien.

== Bibliography ==
- P. Guyer, F. Hefti, Zürcher Ziegeleien, 1912–1962, 1962
- 75 Jahre Zürcher Ziegeleien, 1987
- H. O. Staub, Von Schmidheiny zu Schmidheiny, 1994
