= Mettlen =

Village in Thurgau, Switzerland

- Former municipality
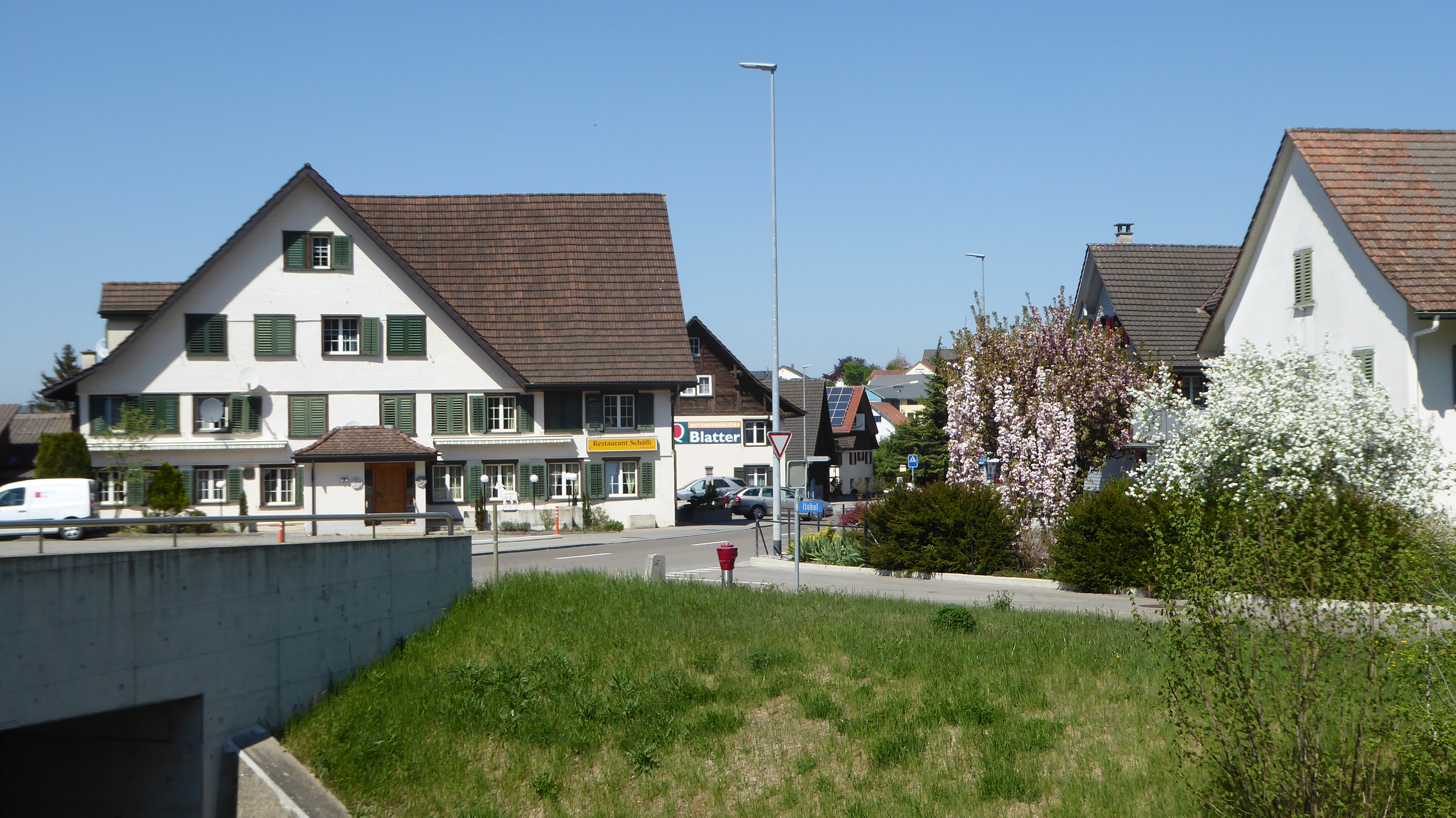
- Entrance to the village from the direction of Wil
- Location of Mettlen
- Location within Switzerland Location within Canton of Thurgau
- Coordinates: 47.5311°N 9.1233°E
- Country: Switzerland
- Canton: Thurgau
- District: Weinfelden
- Municipality: Bussnang

Population (1990)
  - Total: 329
- Time zone: UTC+01:00 (CET)
  - Summer (DST): UTC+02:00 (CEST)
- ISO 3166 code: CH-TG
- Website

Mettlen is a former Ortsgemeinde (local commune) in the canton of Thurgau, Switzerland, which has been part of the municipality of Bussnang in the district of Weinfelden since 1996. From 1803 to 1995 it belonged to the Munizipalgemeinde (municipal commune) of Bussnang. The village, with Altegg and Itobel, lies in the upper Furtbach valley on the busy road from Constance via Bürglen to Wil.

== History ==
Mettlen is possibly first mentioned in 845 as Mittalono. In the early Middle Ages the Abbey of Saint Gall owned property in Mettlen. In 1155 Eberhard von Mettlen ceded his estates to the cathedral chapter of Constance. In 1221 the advocacy (Vogtei) over Mettlen passed from the Toggenburgs to the barons of Bürglen; from then until 1798 Mettlen shared the fate of the lordship of Bürglen. The low court of Mettlen included, among other places, Mettlen, Oberbussnang, Reuti, Werthbühl and Puppikon, as well as parts of Weingarten and Waldi. For a long time the office of Ammann (local magistrate) was held by the Eberhard family. In church matters Mettlen belonged to Werthbühl. From 1529 the Reformed inhabitants attended church in Bussnang, until they were assigned to the church of Schönholzerswilen in 1834.

Grain growing and viticulture dominated; in the 19th century farming shifted to livestock and dairy farming. For decades the clay pit west of the village was worked by the brickworks of Istighofen. From 1870 to 1920 many hand embroiderers (Handsticker) worked in the village, and in 1903 a Schiffli embroidery works was established. Since 1963 Esge AG, housed in the building of the former shoe factory, has successfully produced electrical appliances (Bamix).

Mettlen had 366 inhabitants in 1850, 390 in 1900, 359 in 1950, 264 in 1970 and 329 in 1990.

== Bibliography ==
- Thurgauer Zeitung, 6 January 1976 (supplement); 28 July 1998
- W. Büchi, Kleine Chronik von Mettlen, 1977
- E. Menolfi, Bürglen, 1996
