= Braunau, Switzerland =

Braunau
- Municipality
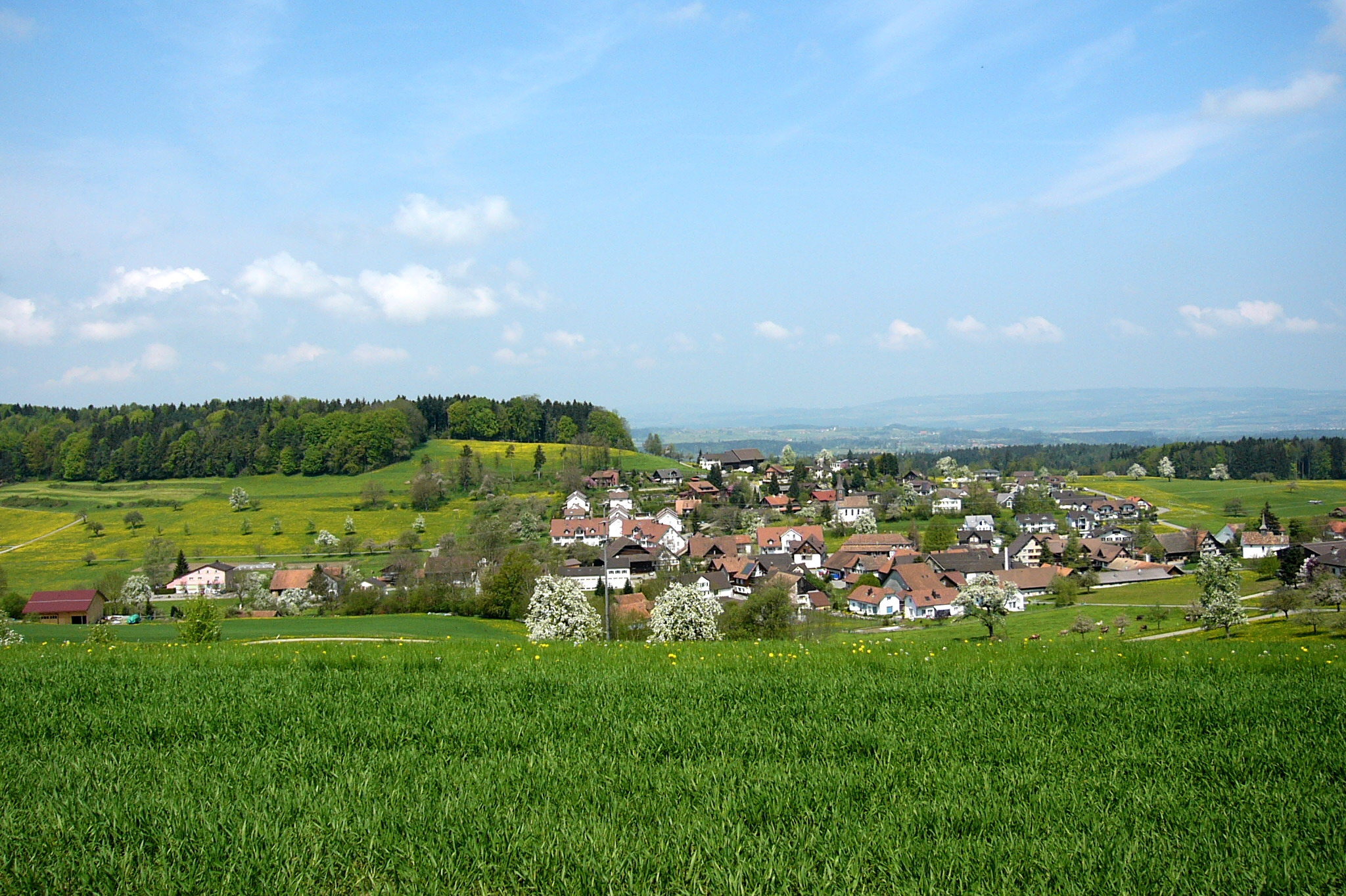
- Braunau village

- Coat of arms
- Location of Braunau
- Location within Switzerland Location within Canton of Thurgau
- Coordinates: 47°30′N 9°4′E
- Country: Switzerland
- Canton: Thurgau
- District: Münchwilen

Area
  - Total: 9.17 km^{2} (3.54 sq mi)
- Elevation: 670 m (2,200 ft)

Population (December 2007)
  - Total: 673
  - Density: 73.4/km^{2} (190/sq mi)
- Time zone: UTC+01:00 (CET)
  - Summer (DST): UTC+02:00 (CEST)
- Postal code: 9502
- SFOS number: 4723
- ISO 3166 code: CH-TG
- Surrounded by: Affeltrangen, Bronschhofen (SG), Bussnang, Schönholzerswilen, Tobel-Tägerschen, Wuppenau
- Website: www.braunau.ch

Braunau (Swiss Standard German pronunciation: [ˈbraʊnaʊ]) is a municipality in the district of Münchwilen in the canton of Thurgau in Switzerland.

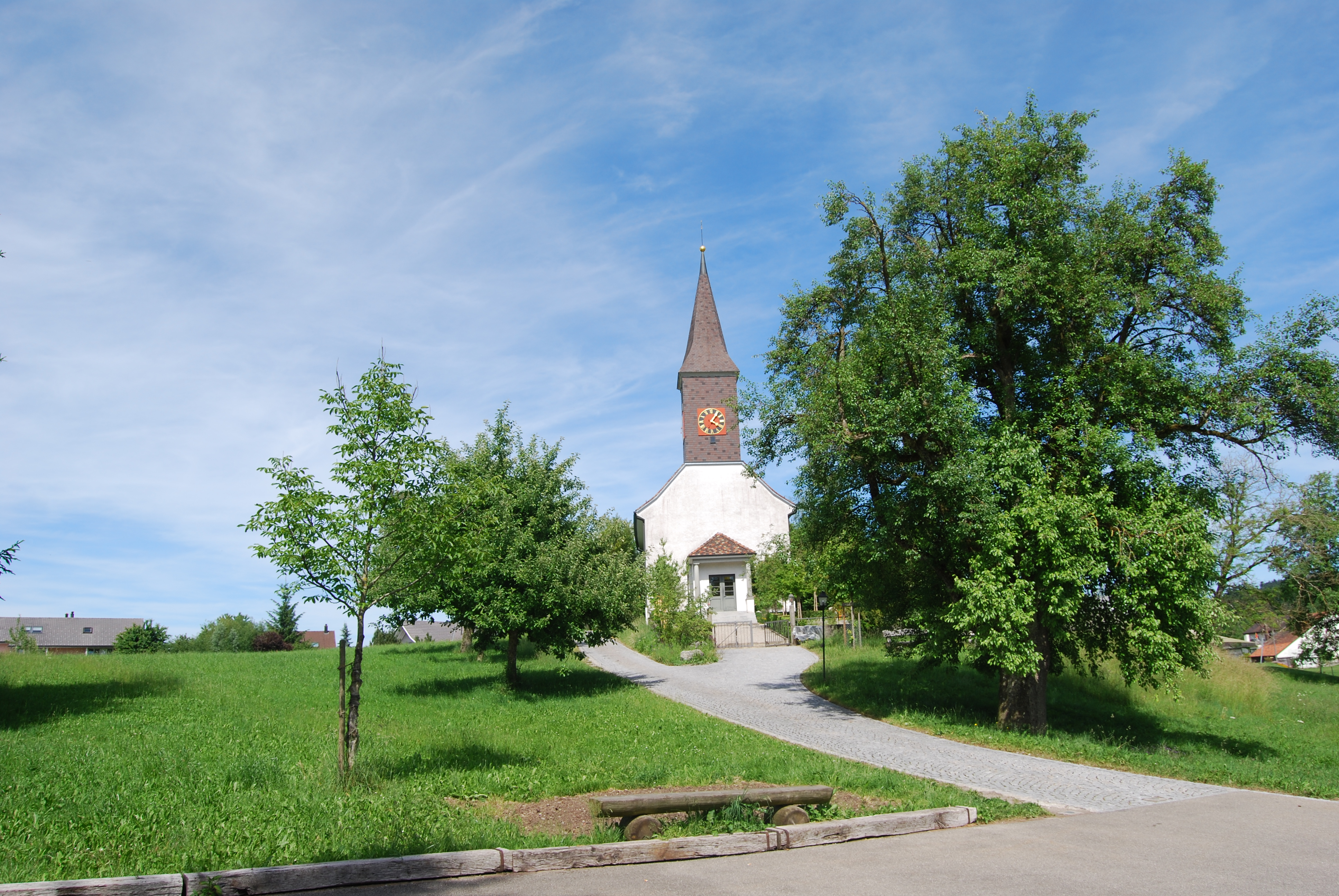
Evangelic church Braunau

== History ==
Braunau is first mentioned in 762 as Pramacunauia, when it was owned by the Abbey of St. Gall. It was acquired when the Abbey acquired land in the Toggenburg. Initially it was ruled as a fief of the Abbey by the Heitnau family, until 1228 when it went to the Knights Hospitaller Commandry of Tobel. It was under their rule until 1798.

Originally, it was part of the Affeltrangen parish, however, St. Michael's Chapel, belonged to the Märwil parish at sometime before 1228. In 1529, most of the population converted during the Protestant Reformation. The remaining Catholics became part of the Tobel parish, while the Reformed members joined the Märwil parish. In 1806-07 a church was constructed, and in 1810 the village separated from Märwil. In 1861 it formed an independent parish.

The regulations (German: Offnung) of 1519 regulated the daily life in the village. Grain was grown in a three-field system. Starting in the mid-19th Century, cattle and dairy farming with cheese production and fruit production became common. In the early 19th Century cotton and linen weaving entered the village as a cottage industry. Since about 1895 timber industry has been in the village with some carpentry and a sawmill.

Until 1998 it was part of the municipality of Tobel.

== Geography ==
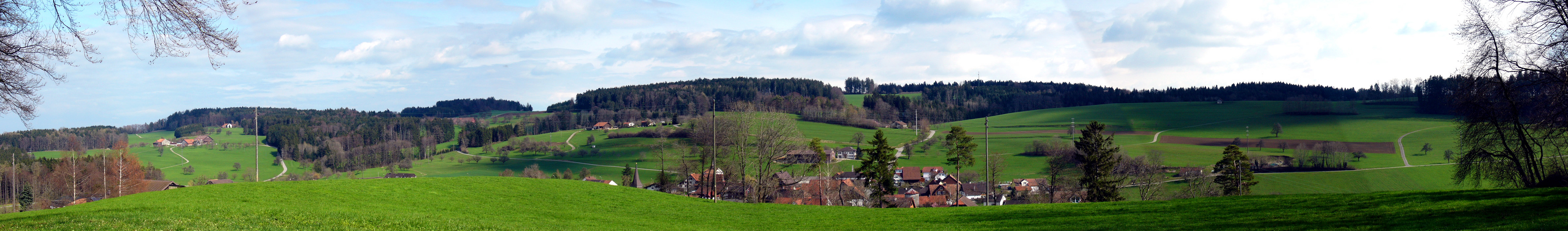
Panorama of Braunau

Braunau has an area, as of 2009, of 9.17 square kilometers (3.54 sq mi). Of this area, 6.29 km^{2} (2.43 sq mi) or 68.6% is used for agricultural purposes, while 2.31 km^{2} (0.89 sq mi) or 25.2% is forested. Of the rest of the land, 0.57 km^{2} (0.22 sq mi) or 6.2% is settled (buildings or roads) and 0.02 km^{2} (4.9 acres) or 0.2% is unproductive land.

Of the built up area, industrial buildings made up 2.7% of the total area while housing and buildings made up 0.1% and transportation infrastructure made up 0.5%. while parks, green belts and sports fields made up 2.6%. Out of the forested land, 21.8% of the total land area is heavily forested and 3.4% is covered with orchards or small clusters of trees. Of the agricultural land, 61.6% is used for growing crops, while 7.0% is used for orchards or vine crops.

The municipality is located in the Münchwilen district. It consists of the village of Braunau and the hamlets of Beckingen, Hittingen, Oberhausen and 17 other settlements.

== Demographics ==
Braunau has a population (as of December 2020) of 801 As of 2008, 6.7% of the population are foreign nationals. Over the last 10 years (1997–2007) the population has changed at a rate of %. Most of the population (as of 2000) speaks German(98.0%), with Russian being second most common ( 0.5%) and English being third ( 0.3%).

As of 2008, the gender distribution of the population was 48.2% male and 51.8% female. The population was made up of 306 Swiss men (45.3% of the population), and 20 (3.0%) non-Swiss men. There were 325 Swiss women (48.1%), and 25 (3.7%) non-Swiss women.

In 2008 there were 12 live births to Swiss citizens and births to non-Swiss citizens, and in same time span there were 5 deaths of Swiss citizens and 1 non-Swiss citizen death. Ignoring immigration and emigration, the population of Swiss citizens increased by 7 while the foreign population decreased by 1. There were 3 Swiss men who emigrated from Switzerland to another country, 5 non-Swiss men who emigrated from Switzerland to another country and 3 non-Swiss women who emigrated from Switzerland to another country. The total Swiss population change in 2008 (from all sources) was a decrease of 10 and the non-Swiss population change was a decrease of 1 people. This represents a population growth rate of -1.6%.

The age distribution, as of 2009, in Braunau is; 89 children or 13.1% of the population are between 0 and 9 years old and 110 teenagers or 16.2% are between 10 and 19. Of the adult population, 68 people or 10.0% of the population are between 20 and 29 years old. 92 people or 13.6% are between 30 and 39, 120 people or 17.7% are between 40 and 49, and 80 people or 11.8% are between 50 and 59. The senior population distribution is 71 people or 10.5% of the population are between 60 and 69 years old, 31 people or 4.6% are between 70 and 79, there are 16 people or 2.4% who are between 80 and 89.

As of 2000, there were 230 private households in the municipality, and an average of 2.8 persons per household. In 2000 there were 104 single family homes (or 88.9% of the total) out of a total of 117 inhabited buildings. There were 6 two family buildings (5.1%), 3 three family buildings (2.6%) and 4 multi-family buildings (or 3.4%). There were 123 (or 18.6%) persons who were part of a couple without children, and 439 (or 66.4%) who were part of a couple with children. There were 36 (or 5.4%) people who lived in single parent home, while there are 8 persons who were adult children living with one or both parents, 3 persons who lived in a household made up of relatives, 4 who lived in a household made up of unrelated persons, and 6 who are either institutionalized or live in another type of collective housing.

The vacancy rate for the municipality, in 2008, was 0.38%. As of 2007, the construction rate of new housing units was 10.2 new units per 1000 residents. In 2000 there were 252 apartments in the municipality. The most common apartment size was the 6 room apartment of which there were 75. There were 4 single room apartments and 75 apartments with six or more rooms.

In the 2007 federal election the most popular party was the SVP which received 58.59% of the vote. The next three most popular parties were the Green Party (10.18%), the CVP (10.11%) and the SP (6.23%). In the federal election, a total of 269 votes were cast, and the voter turnout was 57.2%.

The historical population is given in the following table:

year	population
1850	687
1900	550
1910	487
1941	603
1950	540
1980	459
2000	661

== Economy ==
As of 2007, Braunau had an unemployment rate of 2.16%. As of 2005, there were 96 people employed in the primary economic sector and about 40 businesses involved in this sector. 33 people are employed in the secondary sector and there are 11 businesses in this sector. 42 people are employed in the tertiary sector, with 11 businesses in this sector.

In 2000 there were 459 workers who lived in the municipality. Of these, 214 or about 46.6% of the residents worked outside Braunau while 26 people commuted into the municipality for work. There were a total of 271 jobs (of at least 6 hours per week) in the municipality. Of the working population, 5.5% used public transportation to get to work, and 51% used a private car.

== Religion ==
From the 2000 census, 256 or 38.7% were Roman Catholic, while 319 or 48.3% belonged to the Swiss Reformed Church. Of the rest of the population, there are 5 individuals (or about 0.76% of the population) who belong to the Orthodox Church, and there are 24 individuals (or about 3.63% of the population) who belong to another Christian church. There were xxx 39 (or about 5.90% of the population) belong to no church, are agnostic or atheist, and 18 individuals (or about 2.72% of the population) did not answer the question.

== Weather ==
Braunau has an average of 144 days of rain or snow per year and on average receives 1,098 mm (43.2 in) of precipitation. The wettest month is June during which time Braunau receives an average of 133 mm (5.2 in) of rain or snow. During this month there is precipitation for an average of 14 days. The month with the most days of precipitation is May, with an average of 14, but with only 117 mm (4.6 in) of rain or snow. The driest month of the year is February with an average of 65 mm (2.6 in) of precipitation over 14 days.

== Education ==
The entire Swiss population is generally well educated. In Braunau about 80.2% of the population (between age 25-64) have completed either non-mandatory upper secondary education or additional higher education (either university or a Fachhochschule).
