= Bussnang =

Municipality in the canton of Thurgau, Switzerland

- Municipality
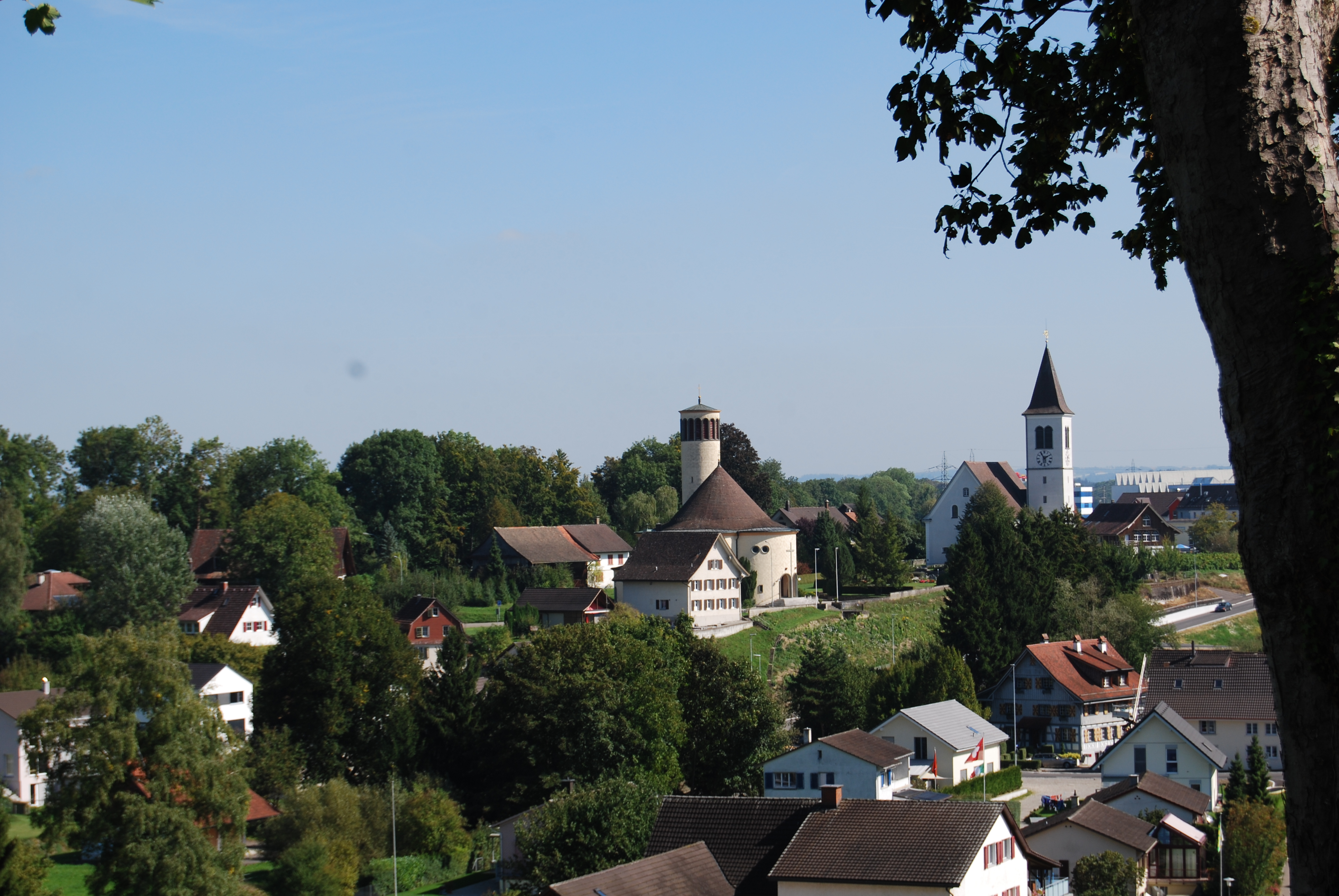

- Flag Coat of arms
- Location of Bussnang
- Location within Switzerland Location within Canton of Thurgau
- Coordinates: 47°33′N 9°4′E
- Country: Switzerland
- Canton: Thurgau
- District: Weinfelden

Area
  - Total: 18.91 km^{2} (7.30 sq mi)
- Elevation: 445 m (1,460 ft)

Population (December 2007)
  - Total: 2,034
  - Density: 107.6/km^{2} (278.6/sq mi)
- Time zone: UTC+01:00 (CET)
  - Summer (DST): UTC+02:00 (CEST)
- Postal code: 9565
- SFOS number: 4921
- ISO 3166 code: CH-TG
- Surrounded by: Affeltrangen, Amlikon-Bissegg, Braunau, Bürglen, Schönholzerswilen, Weinfelden
- Website: www.bussnang.ch

Bussnang is a municipality in the district of Weinfelden in the canton of Thurgau in Switzerland.

== History ==
Bussnang may be first mentioned in 822 as Pussinwanc. During the Early Middle Ages, the Abbey of St. Gall owned much of the land around Bussnang. During the High Middle Ages, the Baron of Bussnang ruled over the village. Starting in 1443, it became part of the Herrschaft of Weinfelden in the low court of Bussnang-Rothenhausen.

The Gallus Church was founded in 885, and in 1123 it was dedicated to John the Baptist. The right to appoint the priest was held by the Baron until 1464, when it went to the Commandry of Tobel. This right remained in Tobel until 1809, when it went to the canton of Thurgau, followed by the municipality in 1830. Originally the parish included the area of the later parishes of Wertbühl (recorded from 1155) and Weinfelden (recorded from 1275). In the Late Middle Ages, the parish stretched out over nine lower courts. The chapel at Schönholzerswilen was a filial church of Bussnang. In 1529, the parish was converted to the Reformation by Johannes Zwick, though mass was re-instituted in 1596. The village church remained a shared church until 1935 when the Catholic Rundkirche was finished. The sectarian clashes were relieved but not settled with the so-called Rosenbach'schen Treaty of 1639.

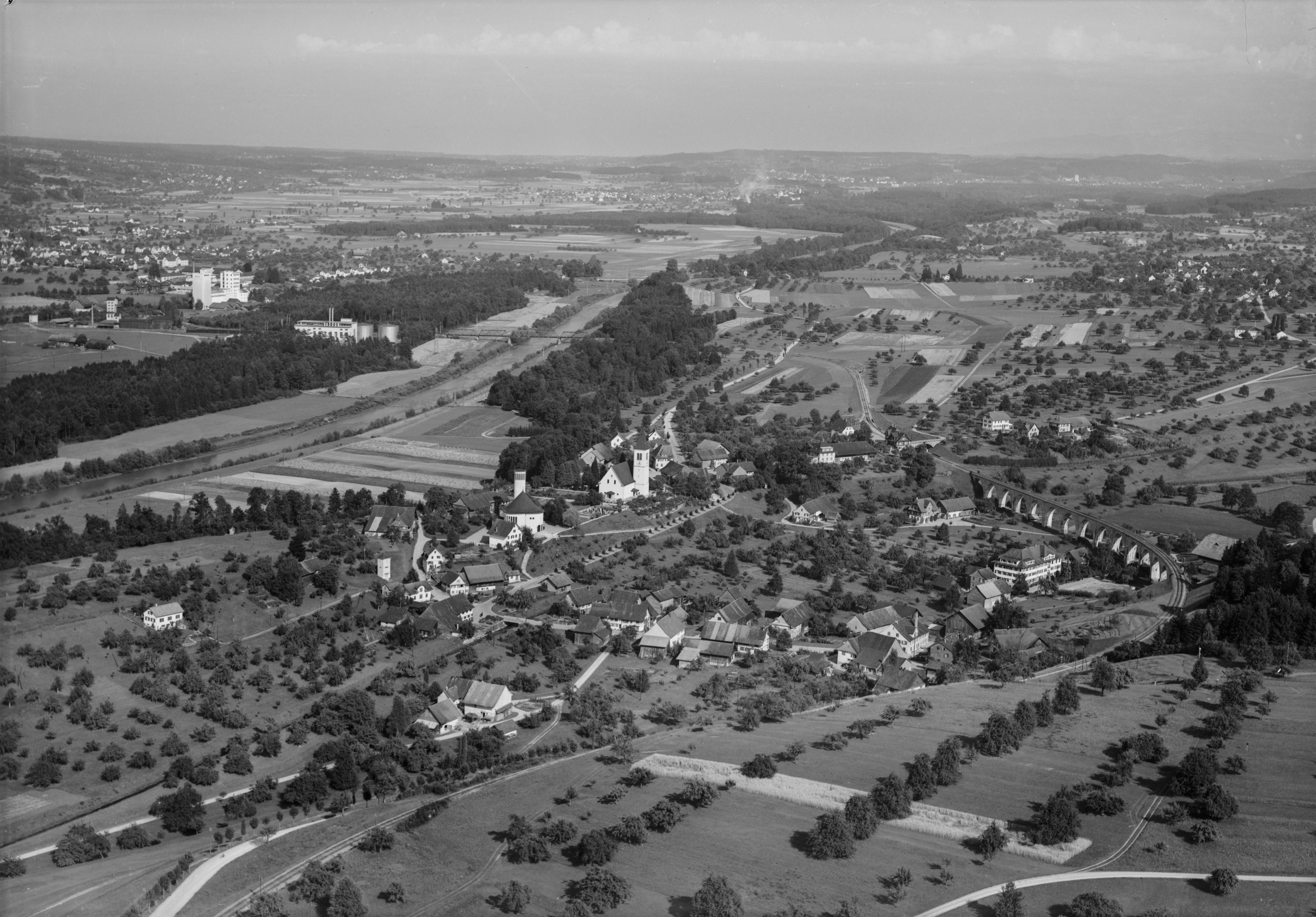
Aerial view (1954)

In 124 AD a Roman bridge was built over the Thur. Later, a ferry operated until 1453 when a bridge was built in Thurrain (part of Rothenhausen). However, through the following centuries traffic remained light and the village experienced little economic growth. In 1882, the Ganggelisteg bridge was built. It was exclusively for pedestrians and brought only limited economic improvement. Since 1912-13 a viaduct of the Mittel-Thurgau-Bahn rail line, has spanned the Furtbach valley. Originally, the main economic activities were grain cultivation in a three-field system and some vineyards. In the 19th century this shifted to cattle and dairy farming and fruit cultivation. The trades were linen weaving and later cotton weaving, with only a few crafts. Since 1963, Stadler Fahrzeuge AG produces their electric railway rolling stock.

== Geography ==
Bussnang has an area, as of 2009, of 18.91 square kilometers (7.30 sq mi). Of this area, 13.38 km^{2} (5.17 sq mi) or 70.8% is used for agricultural purposes, while 3.6 km^{2} (1.4 sq mi) or 19.0% is forested. Of the rest of the land, 1.68 km^{2} (0.65 sq mi) or 8.9% is settled (buildings or roads), 0.28 km^{2} (0.11 sq mi) or 1.5% is either rivers or lakes and 0.04 km^{2} (9.9 acres) or 0.2% is unproductive land.

Of the built up area, industrial buildings made up 4.5% of the total area while housing and buildings made up 0.3% and transportation infrastructure made up 0.2%. while parks, green belts and sports fields made up 3.6%. Out of the forested land, 17.2% of the total land area is heavily forested and 1.9% is covered with orchards or small clusters of trees. Of the agricultural land, 63.6% is used for growing crops, while 7.2% is used for orchards or vine crops. All the water in the municipality is flowing water. Of the unproductive areas, and .

The municipality is located in the Weinfelden district, about 2 km (1.2 mi) southwest of the Weinfelden station on the Frauenfeld-Romanshorn rail line. The current municipality was created in 1996 out of the Munizipalgemeinde of Bussnang, which consisted of the Ortsgemeinden of Bussnang, Friltschen, Lanterswil, Mettlen, Oberbussnang, Oppikon, Reuti and Rothenhausen. The Ortsgemeinde of Istighofen became part of Bürglen in 1995.

== Demographics ==
Bussnang has a population (as of December 2020) of 2,473. As of 2008, 7.2% of the population are foreign nationals. Over the last 10 years (1997–2007) the population has changed at a rate of -0.9%. Most of the population (as of 2000) speaks German (96.9%), with Turkish being second most common ( 0.5%) and Dutch being third ( 0.3%).

As of 2008, the gender distribution of the population was 50.4% male and 49.6% female. The population was made up of 969 Swiss men (46.3% of the population), and 87 (4.2%) non-Swiss men. There were 975 Swiss women (46.5%), and 64 (3.1%) non-Swiss women.

In 2008 there were 18 live births to Swiss citizens and 1 birth to non-Swiss citizens, and in same time span there were 12 deaths of Swiss citizens. Ignoring immigration and emigration, the population of Swiss citizens increased by 6 while the foreign population increased by 1. There was 1 Swiss man, 1 Swiss woman who emigrated from Switzerland to another country, 2 non-Swiss men who emigrated from Switzerland to another country and 8 non-Swiss women who emigrated from Switzerland to another country. The total Swiss population change in 2008 (from all sources) was an increase of 43 and the non-Swiss population change was an increase of 4 people. This represents a population growth rate of 2.3%.

The age distribution, as of 2009, in Bussnang is; 223 children or 10.7% of the population are between 0 and 9 years old and 317 teenagers or 15.2% are between 10 and 19. Of the adult population, 258 people or 12.4% of the population are between 20 and 29 years old. 261 people or 12.6% are between 30 and 39, 354 people or 17.0% are between 40 and 49, and 275 people or 13.2% are between 50 and 59. The senior population distribution is 188 people or 9.0% of the population are between 60 and 69 years old, 107 people or 5.1% are between 70 and 79, there are 86 people or 4.1% who are between 80 and 89, and there are 10 people or 0.5% who are 90 and older.

As of 2000, there were 708 private households in the municipality, and an average of 2.8 persons per household. In 2000 there were 330 single family homes (or 84.6% of the total) out of a total of 390 inhabited buildings. There were 28 two family buildings (7.2%), 14 three family buildings (3.6%) and 18 multi-family buildings (or 4.6%). There were 412 (or 19.8%) persons who were part of a couple without children, and 1,254 (or 60.1%) who were part of a couple with children. There were 103 (or 4.9%) people who lived in single parent home, while there are 16 persons who were adult children living with one or both parents, 8 persons who lived in a household made up of relatives, 14 who lived in a household made up of unrelated persons, and 114 who are either institutionalized or live in another type of collective housing.

The vacancy rate for the municipality, in 2008, was 1.17%. As of 2007, the construction rate of new housing units was 3.9 new units per 1000 residents. In 2000 there were 822 apartments in the municipality. The most common apartment size was the 6 room apartment of which there were 232. There were 15 single room apartments and 232 apartments with six or more rooms. As of 2000 the average price to rent an average apartment in Bussnang was 1080.51 Swiss francs (CHF) per month (US$860, £490, €690 approx. exchange rate from 2000). The average rate for a one-room apartment was 582.00 CHF (US$470, £260, €370), a two-room apartment was about 743.58 CHF (US$590, £330, €480), a three-room apartment was about 887.63 CHF (US$710, £400, €570) and a six or more room apartment cost an average of 1328.42 CHF (US$1060, £600, €850). The average apartment price in Bussnang was 96.8% of the national average of 1116 CHF.

In the 2007 federal election the most popular party was the SVP which received 47.82% of the vote. The next three most popular parties were the CVP (12.87%), the FDP (10.72%) and the Green Party (9.39%). In the federal election, a total of 734 votes were cast, and the voter turnout was 50.2%.

The historical population is given in the following table:

year	population
1850	2,062
1900	2,058
1920	1,950
1950	2,220
1990	2,259
2000	2,085

== Sights ==
The entire hamlet of Wertbühl is designated as part of the Inventory of Swiss Heritage Sites.

== Economy ==
Bussnang is shaped by Stadler Rail, the sixth-largest railroad manufacturer in the world. Stadler Rail has its headquarters since 1962 in Bussnang when it was moved there from Zürich. In addition to sales, Bussnang is also home to the competence center for the SMILE, FLIRT and GTW type series as well as the Tailor Made division (including railway and broad-gauge vehicles).

As of 2007, Bussnang had an unemployment rate of 1.43%. As of 2005, there were 232 people employed in the primary economic sector and about 82 businesses involved in this sector. 790 people are employed in the secondary sector and there are 27 businesses in this sector. 271 people are employed in the tertiary sector, with 36 businesses in this sector.

In 2000 there were 1,401 workers who lived in the municipality. Of these, 650 or about 46.4% of the residents worked outside Bussnang while 433 people commuted into the municipality for work. There were a total of 1,184 jobs (of at least 6 hours per week) in the municipality. Of the working population, 7.3% used public transportation to get to work, and 46.2% used a private car.

== Religion ==
From the 2000 census, 643 or 30.8% were Roman Catholic, while 1,121 or 53.8% belonged to the Swiss Reformed Church. Of the rest of the population, there are 5 individuals (or about 0.24% of the population) who belong to the Orthodox Church, and there are 69 individuals (or about 3.31% of the population) who belong to another Christian church. There were 25 (or about 1.20% of the population) who are Islamic. There are 3 individuals (or about 0.14% of the population) who belong to another church (not listed on the census), 150 (or about 7.19% of the population) belong to no church, are agnostic or atheist, and 69 individuals (or about 3.31% of the population) did not answer the question.

== Transport ==
Bussnang sits on the Wil–Kreuzlingen line between Wil and Weinfelden and is served by the St. Gallen S-Bahn at Bussnang and Oppikon.

== Education ==
The entire Swiss population is generally well educated. In Bussnang about 77.2% of the population (between age 25 and 64) have completed either non-mandatory upper secondary education or additional higher education (either University or a Fachhochschule).

Bussnang is home to the Bussnang-Rothenhausen primary school district. In the 2008/2009 school year there were 103 students. There were 24 children in the kindergarten, and the average class size was 24 kindergartners. Of the children in kindergarten, 17 or 70.8% were female, 5 or 20.8% were not Swiss citizens and 5 or 20.8% did not speak German natively. The lower and upper primary levels begin at about age 5-6 and last for 6 years. There were 34 children in who were at the lower primary level and 45 children in the upper primary level. The average class size in the primary school was 19.75 students. At the lower primary level, there were 21 children or 61.8% of the total population who were female, 4 or 11.8% were not Swiss citizens and 3 or 8.8% did not speak German natively. In the upper primary level, there were 17 or 37.8% who were female, 5 or 11.1% were not Swiss citizens and 3 or 6.7% did not speak German natively.
