= Schönholzerswilen =

- Municipality
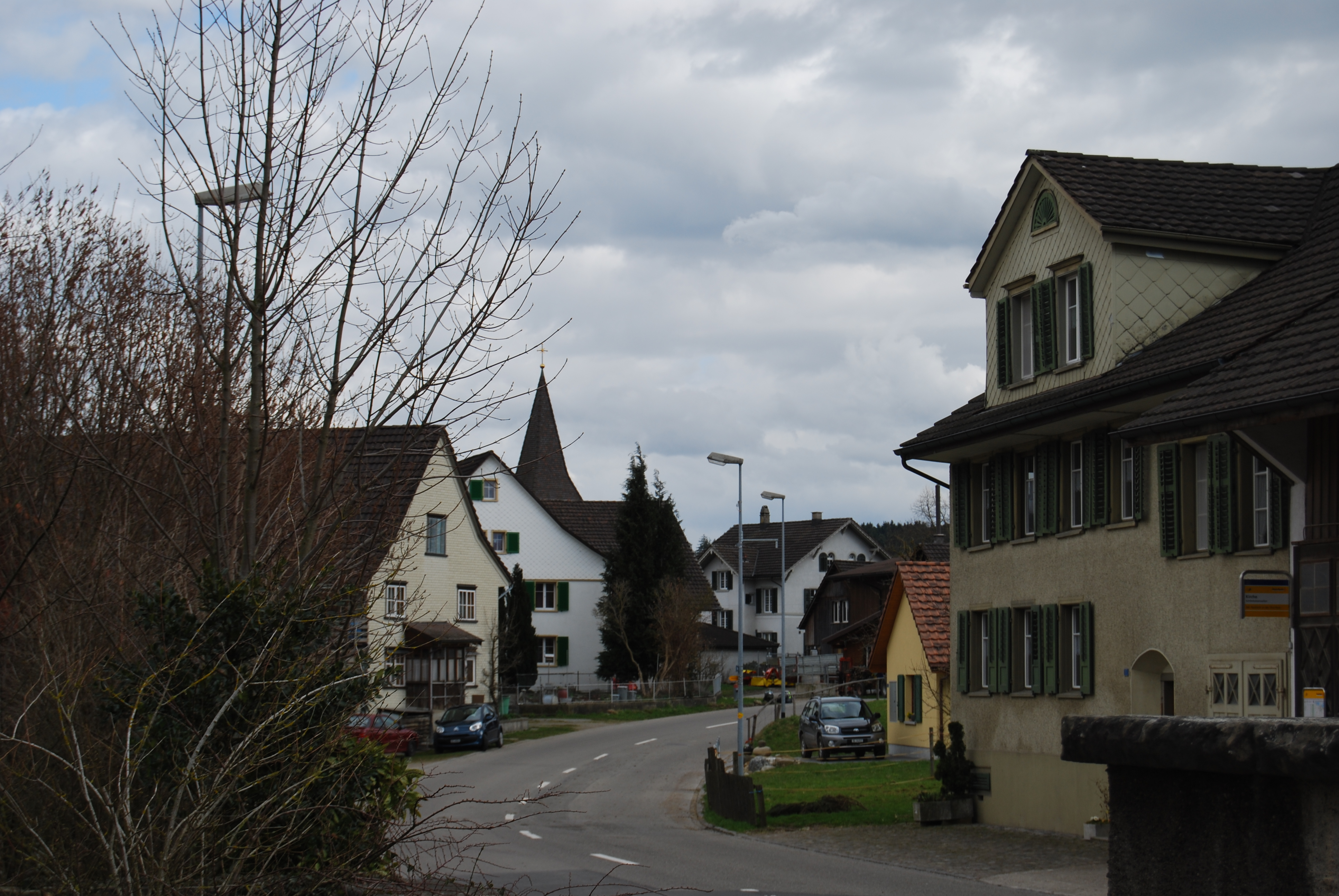

- Coat of arms
- Location of Schönholzerswilen
- Location within Switzerland Location within Canton of Thurgau
- Coordinates: 47°31′N 9°8′E
- Country: Switzerland
- Canton: Thurgau
- District: Münchwilen

Area
  - Total: 10.9 km^{2} (4.2 sq mi)
- Elevation: 555 m (1,821 ft)

Population (December 2007)
  - Total: 751
  - Density: 68.9/km^{2} (178/sq mi)
- Time zone: UTC+01:00 (CET)
  - Summer (DST): UTC+02:00 (CEST)
- Postal code: 8577
- SFOS number: 4756
- ISO 3166 code: CH-TG
- Surrounded by: Braunau, Bürglen, Bussnang, Kradolf-Schönenberg, Wuppenau
- Website: www.schoenholzerswilen.ch

Schönholzerswilen is a municipality in the district of Münchwilen in the canton of Thurgau in Switzerland.

== History ==
Schönholzerswilen is probably first mentioned in 857 as Wichrammeswilare. In 1216 it was mentioned as Wilær and in 1693 it was mentioned as Schönholtzerß Wÿlen. Between 1803 and 1964, the Ortsgemeinden of Schönholzerswilen and Toos formed the Munizipalgemeinde of Schönholzerswilen. In 1964 both communities merged to form the political municipality of Schönholzerswilen.

Numerous neolithic objects, including stone axes and neolithic grave mounds, indicate that the area was inhabited anciently. Additionally, Roman era coins have been discovered in the municipality. Very little is known about the village in the Middle Ages, except for several brief entries in historic records. In 1439 the Abbey of St. Gallen bought the low court rights in the village from Ulrich von St. Johann. The Abbey combined the village of Schönholzerswilen along with Heiligkreuz, Wuppenau and half of Toos to form a single court. Many of the surrounding farm houses remained part of the Freigericht Thurlinden (Free Court of Thurlinden) instead of being incorporated into the Abbey's court. The Freigericht Thurlinden remained independent of Schönholzerswilen until the creation of the Helvetic Republic in 1798.

Schönholzerswilen was probably a full parish by 1275. However, over the following years it decreased in importance and by 1508 the village church was just a filial church under the parish of Bussnang. When the parish of Bussnang converted during the Protestant Reformation, the abbot of St. Gallen forced Schönholzerswilen to remain Catholic. Schönholzerswilen remained Catholic until 1677. In 1718 they received a priest from Zürich. Zurich continued to appoint the village priest until 1843. Starting in 1820, the Catholics in the village were part of the parish of Wuppenau. This lasted for over thirty years, until in 1854 a Catholic parish was established in the municipality.

== Geography ==
Schönholzerswilen has an area, as of 2009, of 10.94 square kilometers (4.22 sq mi). Of this area, 7.72 km^{2} (2.98 sq mi) or 70.6% is used for agricultural purposes, while 2.36 km^{2} (0.91 sq mi) or 21.6% is forested. Of the rest of the land, 0.8 km^{2} (0.31 sq mi) or 7.3% is settled (buildings or roads) and 0.05 km^{2} (12 acres) or 0.5% is unproductive land.

Of the built up area, industrial buildings made up 3.3% of the total area while housing and buildings made up 0.0% and transportation infrastructure made up 1.4%. while parks, green belts and sports fields made up 2.6%. Out of the forested land, 19.7% of the total land area is heavily forested and 1.8% is covered with orchards or small clusters of trees. Of the agricultural land, 60.1% is used for growing crops, while 10.5% is used for orchards or vine crops.

The municipality is located in the Münchwilen district, on a ridge of the Gabrisstock between Bürglen (in Thurgau) and Wil (in St. Gallen). It consists of the village of Schönholzerswilen and the hamlets of Hagenwil, Leutenegg and Ritzisbuhwil as well as others.

== Demographics ==
Schönholzerswilen has a population (as of December 2020) of 839 As of 2008, 4.4% of the population are foreign nationals. Over the last 10 years (1997–2007) the population has changed at a rate of -1.6%. Most of the population (as of 2000) speaks German(98.9%), with Portuguese being second most common ( 0.3%) and French being third ( 0.1%).

As of 2008, the gender distribution of the population was 50.5% male and 49.5% female. The population was made up of 374 Swiss men (48.4% of the population), and 16 (2.1%) non-Swiss men. There were 365 Swiss women (47.2%), and 18 (2.3%) non-Swiss women.

In 2008 there were 9 live births to Swiss citizens, and in same time span there were 5 deaths of Swiss citizens. Ignoring immigration and emigration, the population of Swiss citizens increased by 4 while the foreign population remained the same. There was 1 Swiss man and 1 non-Swiss man who emigrated from Switzerland to another country and 4 non-Swiss women who emigrated from Switzerland to another country. The total Swiss population change in 2008 (from all sources) was an increase of 6 and the non-Swiss population change was an increase of 15 people. This represents a population growth rate of 2.8%.

The age distribution, as of 2009, in Schönholzerswilen is; 92 children or 11.9% of the population are between 0 and 9 years old and 148 teenagers or 19.2% are between 10 and 19. Of the adult population, 72 people or 9.4% of the population are between 20 and 29 years old. 91 people or 11.8% are between 30 and 39, 140 people or 18.2% are between 40 and 49, and 83 people or 10.8% are between 50 and 59. The senior population distribution is 56 people or 7.3% of the population are between 60 and 69 years old, 60 people or 7.8% are between 70 and 79, there are 25 people or 3.2% who are between 80 and 89, and there are 3 people or 0.4% who are 90 and older.

As of 2000, there were 246 private households in the municipality, and an average of 3. persons per household. In 2000 there were 115 single family homes (or 89.8% of the total) out of a total of 128 inhabited buildings. There were 10 two family buildings (7.8%), 2 three family buildings (1.6%) and 1 multi-family buildings (or .8%). There were 128 (or 17.5%) persons who were part of a couple without children, and 490 (or 67.0%) who were part of a couple with children. There were 32 (or 4.4%) people who lived in single parent home, while there are 10 persons who were adult children living with one or both parents, 2 persons who lived in a household made up of relatives, 4 who lived in a household made up of unrelated persons, and 5 who are either institutionalized or live in another type of collective housing.

The vacancy rate for the municipality, in 2008, was 0%. As of 2007, the construction rate of new housing units was 0 new units per 1000 residents. In 2000 there were 260 apartments in the municipality. The most common apartment size was the 6-room apartment of which there were 103. There were – single room apartments and 103 apartments with six or more rooms.

In the 2007 federal election the most popular party was the SVP which received 56.26% of the vote. The next three most popular parties were the CVP (13.32%), the Green Party (9.09%) and the SP (6.86%). In the federal election, a total of 301 votes were cast, and the voter turnout was 55.3%.

The historical population is given in the following table:

year	population
1831	870
1850	903
1900	798
1950	762
1960	695
1970	732
1990	720
2000	731
2012	778

== Heritage sites of national significance ==
The Toos-Waldi, a Bronze Age hill settlement is listed as a Swiss heritage site of national significance. The entire village of Schönholzerswilen is part of the Inventory of Swiss Heritage Sites.

== Economy ==
As of 2007, Schönholzerswilen had an unemployment rate of 0.99%. As of 2005, there were 153 people employed in the primary economic sector and about 56 businesses involved in this sector. 21 people are employed in the secondary sector and there are 7 businesses in this sector. 61 people are employed in the tertiary sector, with 17 businesses in this sector.

In 2000 there were 504 workers who lived in the municipality. Of these, 211 or about 41.9% of the residents worked outside Schönholzerswilen while 33 people commuted into the municipality for work. There were a total of 326 jobs (of at least 6 hours per week) in the municipality. Of the working population, 4.7% used public transportation to get to work, and 46.3% used a private car.

== Religion ==
From the 2000 census, 263 or 36.0% were Roman Catholic, while 402 or 55.0% belonged to the Swiss Reformed Church. Of the rest of the population, there is 1 individual who belongs to the Orthodox Church, and there are 15 individuals (or about 2.05% of the population) who belong to another Christian church. There were there is 1 individual who is Islamic. 31 (or about 4.24% of the population) belong to no church, are agnostic or atheist, and 18 individuals (or about 2.46% of the population) did not answer the question.

== Education ==
In Schönholzerswilen about 75.2% of the population (between age 25–64) have completed either non-mandatory upper secondary education or additional higher education (either university or a Fachhochschule).
