= Weinfelden =

- Municipality
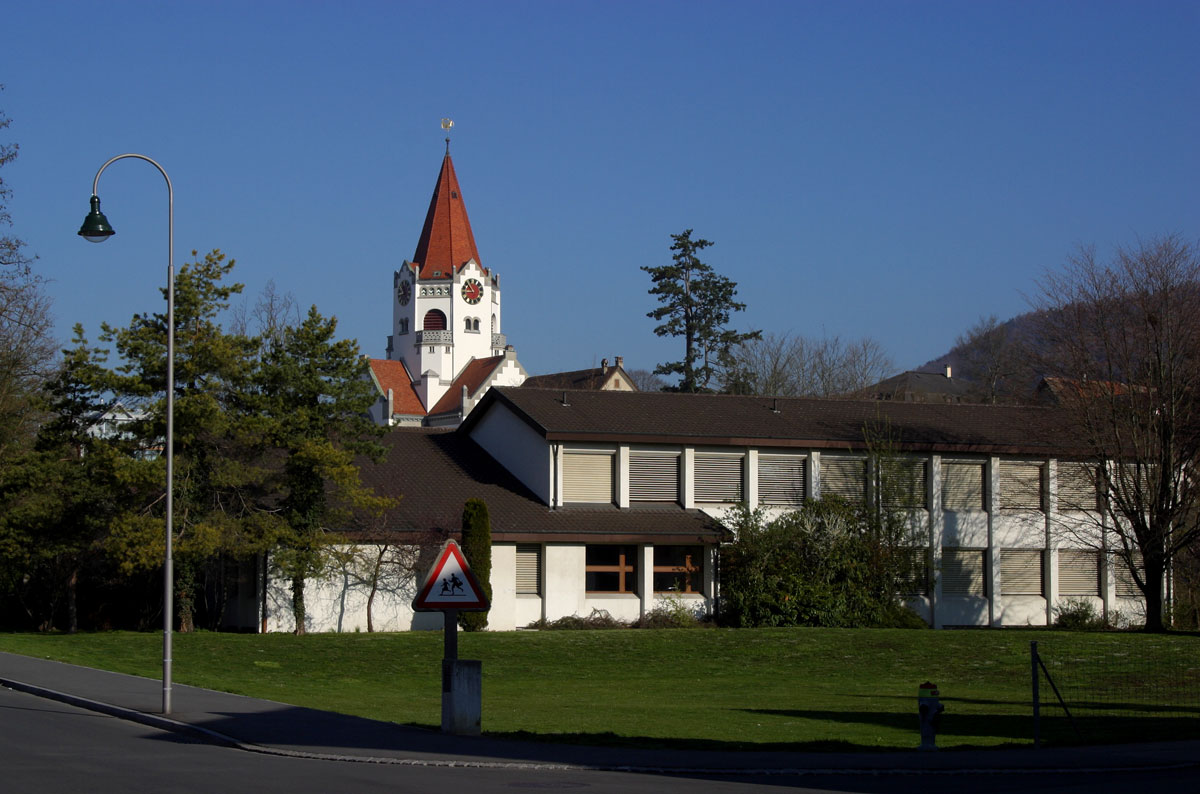

- Coat of arms
- Location of Weinfelden
- Location within Switzerland Location within Canton of Thurgau
- Coordinates: 47°34′N 9°6′E
- Country: Switzerland
- Canton: Thurgau
- District: Weinfelden

Area
  - Total: 15.5 km^{2} (6.0 sq mi)
- Elevation: 432 m (1,417 ft)

Population (2008)
  - Total: 9,977
  - Density: 644/km^{2} (1,670/sq mi)
- Time zone: UTC+01:00 (CET)
  - Summer (DST): UTC+02:00 (CEST)
- Postal code: 8570
- SFOS number: 4946
- ISO 3166 code: CH-TG
- Surrounded by: Amlikon-Bissegg, Berg, Bürglen, Bussnang, Kemmental, Märstetten
- Website: www.weinfelden.ch

Weinfelden is a municipality in the canton of Thurgau in Switzerland. It is the capital of the district of the same name.

Weinfelden is an old town, which was known during Roman times as Quivelda (Winis Feld).

Weinfelden is mostly known throughout Switzerland for its hockey team, HC Thurgau which is currently playing in the Swiss League.

== History ==
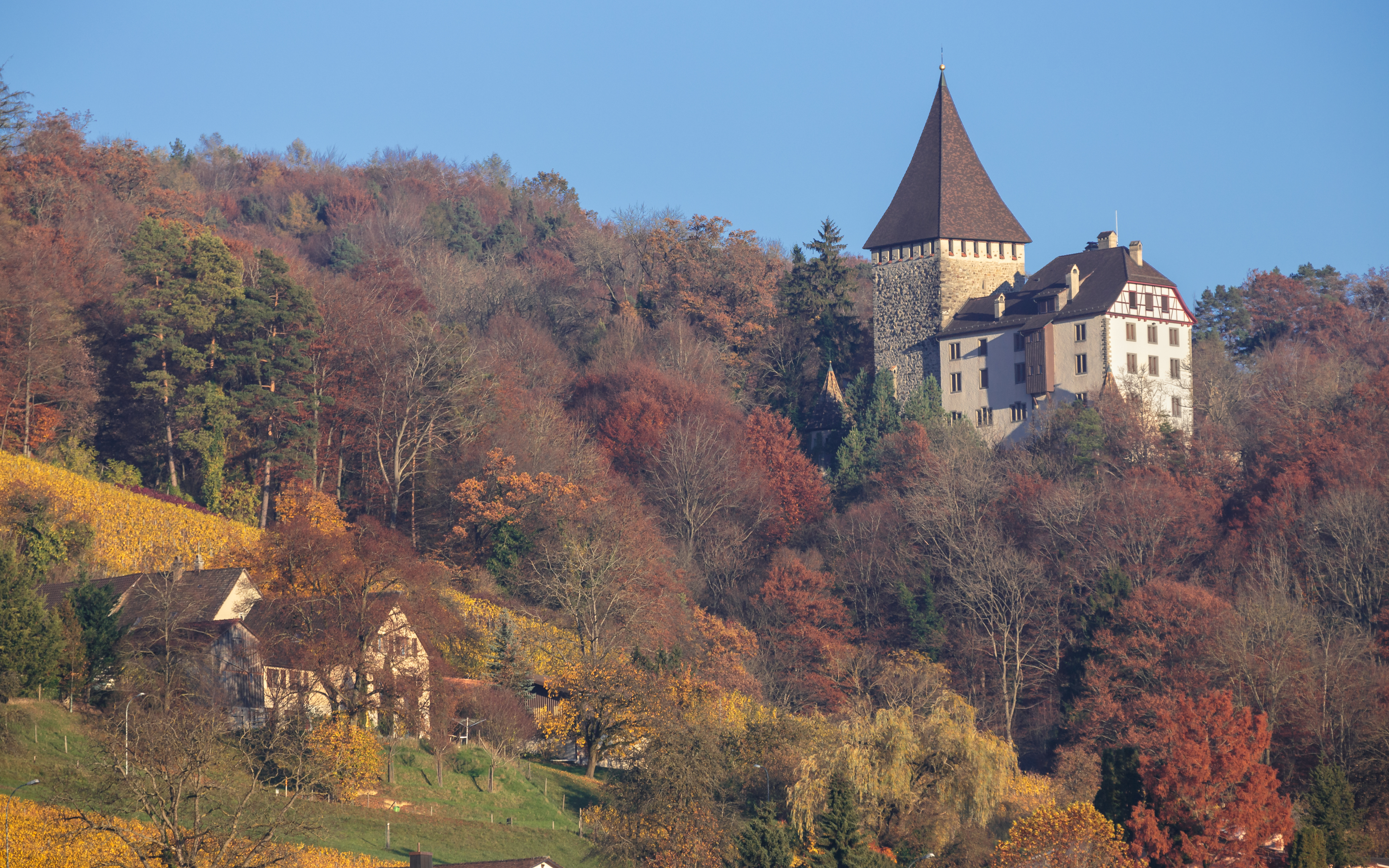
Weinfelden Castle

Aerial view from 600 m by Walter Mittelholzer (1919)

Already in the year 124 AD, there was a Roman bridge over the Thur in Weinfelden. The name Weinfelden appears the first time in a document from 838.

Weinfelden was by far the biggest town in the canton of Thurgau. In 1798, Paul Reinhart and his committee led the area to freedom from the domination of the Eidgenossen. In 1803, Thurgau became an independent canton, through the mediation of Napoleon, with Frauenfeld as capital.

In 1830, Thomas Bornhauser spoke to a large crowd in Weinfelden, demanding a liberal constitution for the canton. It is one of the first (if not the first) such document.

Portraits of both Paul Reinhart and Thomas Bornhauser hang in the Rathaus.

Since it lies in the middle of the canton, part of the cantonal administration is located in the town, as is the Thurgau cantonal bank. The grand council of the canton meets in Weinfelden during the winter.

== Geography ==
Weinfelden has an area, as of 2009, of 15.5 square kilometers (6.0 sq mi). Of this area, 7.98 km^{2} (3.08 sq mi) or 51.5% is used for agricultural purposes, while 3.48 km^{2} (1.34 sq mi) or 22.5% is forested. Of the rest of the land, 3.9 km^{2} (1.5 sq mi) or 25.2% is settled (buildings or roads), 0.18 km^{2} (0.069 sq mi) or 1.2% is either rivers or lakes.

Of the built up area, industrial buildings made up 11.6% of the total area while housing and buildings made up 3.9% and transportation infrastructure made up 2.8%. Power and water infrastructure as well as other special developed areas made up 1.4% of the area while parks, green belts and sports fields made up 5.5%. Out of the forested land, 20.1% of the total land area is heavily forested and 2.4% is covered with orchards or small clusters of trees. Of the agricultural land, 43.3% is used for growing crops, while 8.2% is used for orchards or vine crops. All the water in the municipality is flowing water.

== Demographics ==
Weinfelden has a population (as of December 2020) of 11,629. As of 2008, 19.9% of the population are foreign nationals. Over the last 10 years (1997–2007) the population has changed at a rate of 6.5%. Most of the population (as of 2000) speaks German (86.7%), with Italian being second most common ( 3.2%) and Albanian being third ( 2.4%).

As of 2008, the gender distribution of the population was 49.9% male and 50.1% female. The population was made up of 3,903 Swiss men (39.0% of the population), and 1,086 (10.9%) non-Swiss men. There were 4,116 Swiss women (41.1%), and 901 (9.0%) non-Swiss women.

In 2008 there were 65 live births to Swiss citizens and 24 births to non-Swiss citizens, and in same time span there were 96 deaths of Swiss citizens. Ignoring immigration and emigration, the population of Swiss citizens decreased by 31 while the foreign population increased by 24. There were 5 Swiss men who emigrated from Switzerland to another country, 9 Swiss women who emigrated from Switzerland to another country, 75 non-Swiss men who emigrated from Switzerland to another country and 38 non-Swiss women who emigrated from Switzerland to another country. The total Swiss population change in 2008 (from all sources) was an increase of 24 and the non-Swiss population change was an increase of 82 people. This represents a population growth rate of 1.1%.

The age distribution, as of 2009, in Weinfelden is; 927 children or 9.1% of the population are between 0 and 9 years old and 1,130 teenagers or 11.1% are between 10 and 19. Of the adult population, 1,549 people or 15.3% of the population are between 20 and 29 years old. 1,347 people or 13.3% are between 30 and 39, 1,464 people or 14.4% are between 40 and 49, and 1,304 people or 12.9% are between 50 and 59. The senior population distribution is 1,008 people or 9.9% of the population are between 60 and 69 years old, 823 people or 8.1% are between 70 and 79, there are 508 people or 5.0% who are between 80 and 89, and there are 81 people or 0.8% who are 90 and older.

As of 2000, there were 4,116 private households in the municipality, and an average of 2.2 persons per household. In 2000 there were 939 single family homes (or 67.3% of the total) out of a total of 1,396 inhabited buildings. There were 134 two family buildings (9.6%), 63 three family buildings (4.5%) and 260 multi-family buildings (or 18.6%). There were 2,423 (or 25.6%) persons who were part of a couple without children, and 4,489 (or 47.5%) who were part of a couple with children. There were 465 (or 4.9%) people who lived in single parent home, while there are 44 persons who were adult children living with one or both parents, 29 persons who lived in a household made up of relatives, 100 who lived in a household made up of unrelated persons, and 362 who are either institutionalized or live in another type of collective housing.

The vacancy rate for the municipality, in 2008, was 1.51%. As of 2007, the construction rate of new housing units was 2.6 new units per 1000 residents. In 2000 there were 4,527 apartments in the municipality. The most common apartment size was the 4 room apartment of which there were 1,416. There were 194 single room apartments and 545 apartments with six or more rooms. As of 2000 the average price to rent an average apartment in Weinfelden was 938.69 Swiss francs (CHF) per month (US$750, £420, €600 approx. exchange rate from 2000). The average rate for a one-room apartment was 485.07 CHF (US$390, £220, €310), a two-room apartment was about 715.31 CHF (US$570, £320, €460), a three-room apartment was about 838.46 CHF (US$670, £380, €540) and a six or more room apartment cost an average of 1456.25 CHF (US$1160, £660, €930). The average apartment price in Weinfelden was 84.1% of the national average of 1116 CHF.

In the 2007 federal election the most popular party was the SVP which received 34.16% of the vote. The next three most popular parties were the FDP (18.78%), the CVP (16.11%) and the SP (10.75%). In the federal election, a total of 3,415 votes were cast, and the voter turnout was 51.0%.

The historical population is given in the following table:

year	population
1950	6,085
1960	7,213
1980	9,007
1990	9,299
2000	9,456

== Heritage sites of national significance ==
The Gasthaus Zum Trauben, Bachtobel Castle with wine press, the Rathaus (Town council house), and the Reformed Church are listed as Swiss heritage sites of national significance. The village of Weinfelden and the Ottenberg Südhang area are both part of the Inventory of Swiss Heritage Sites.

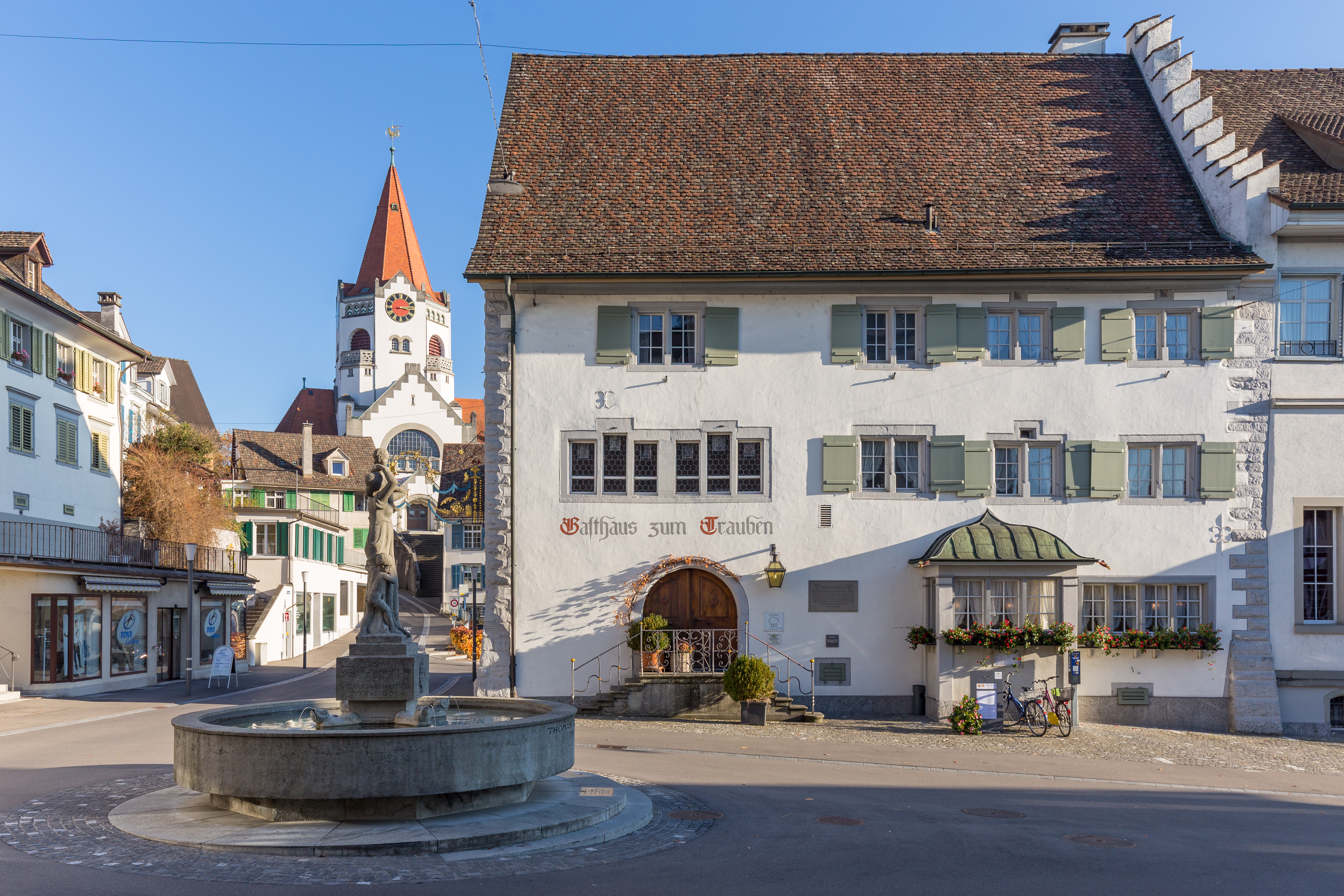
"Gasthaus zum Trauben" and Reformed Church

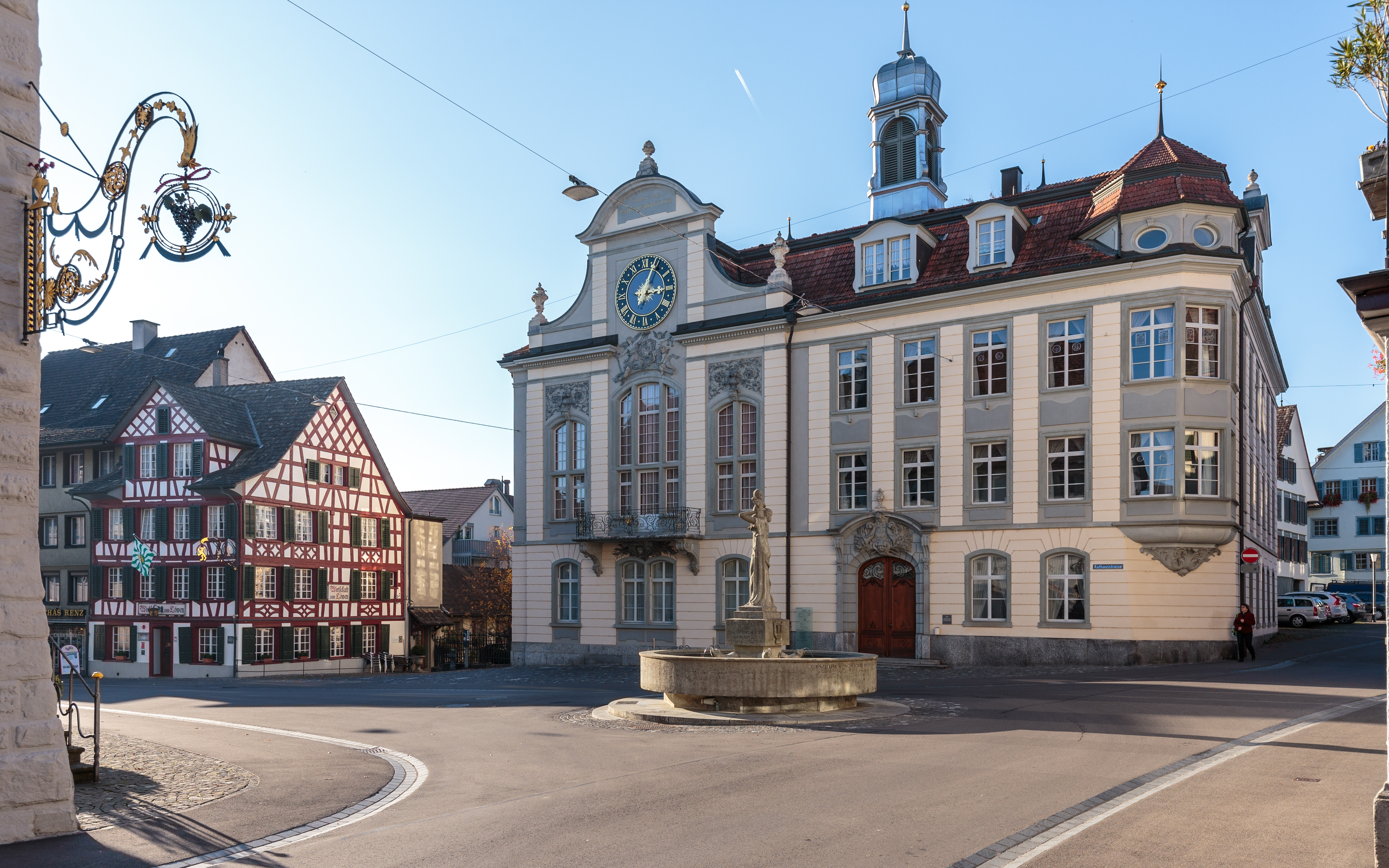
"Rathaus" and "Wirtschaft zum Löwen"

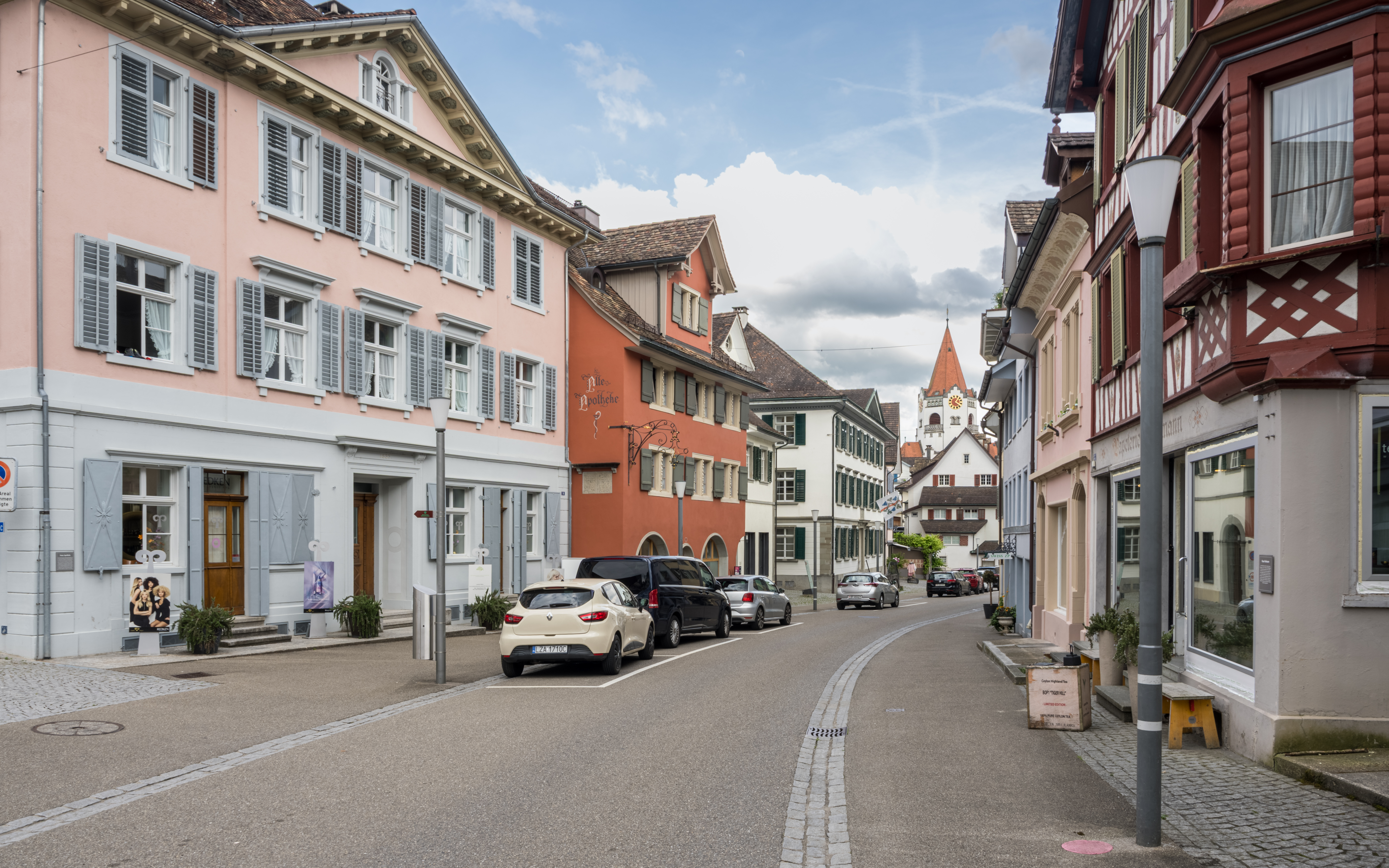
Frauenfelderstrasse and Ref. Church

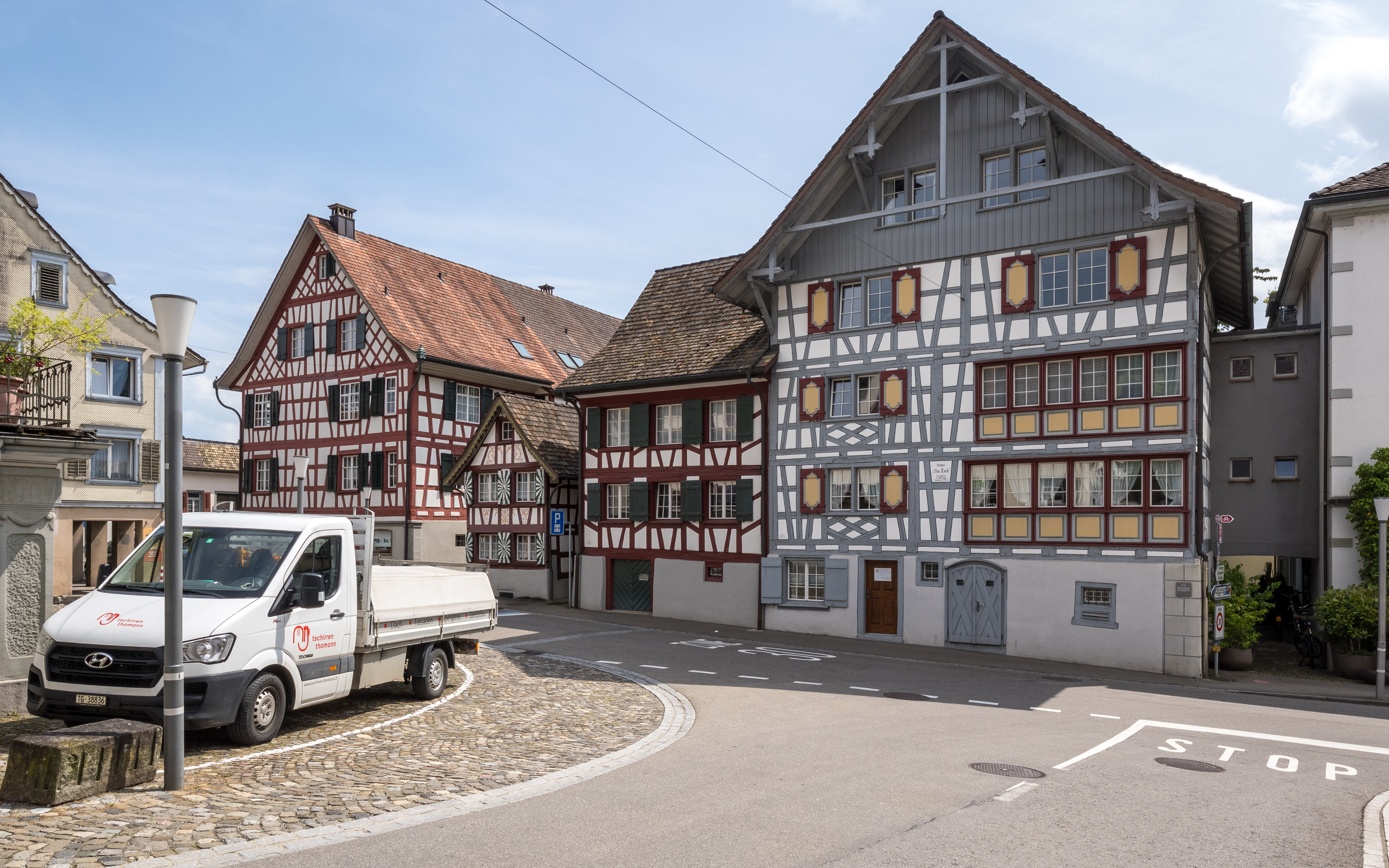
Timber framed houses

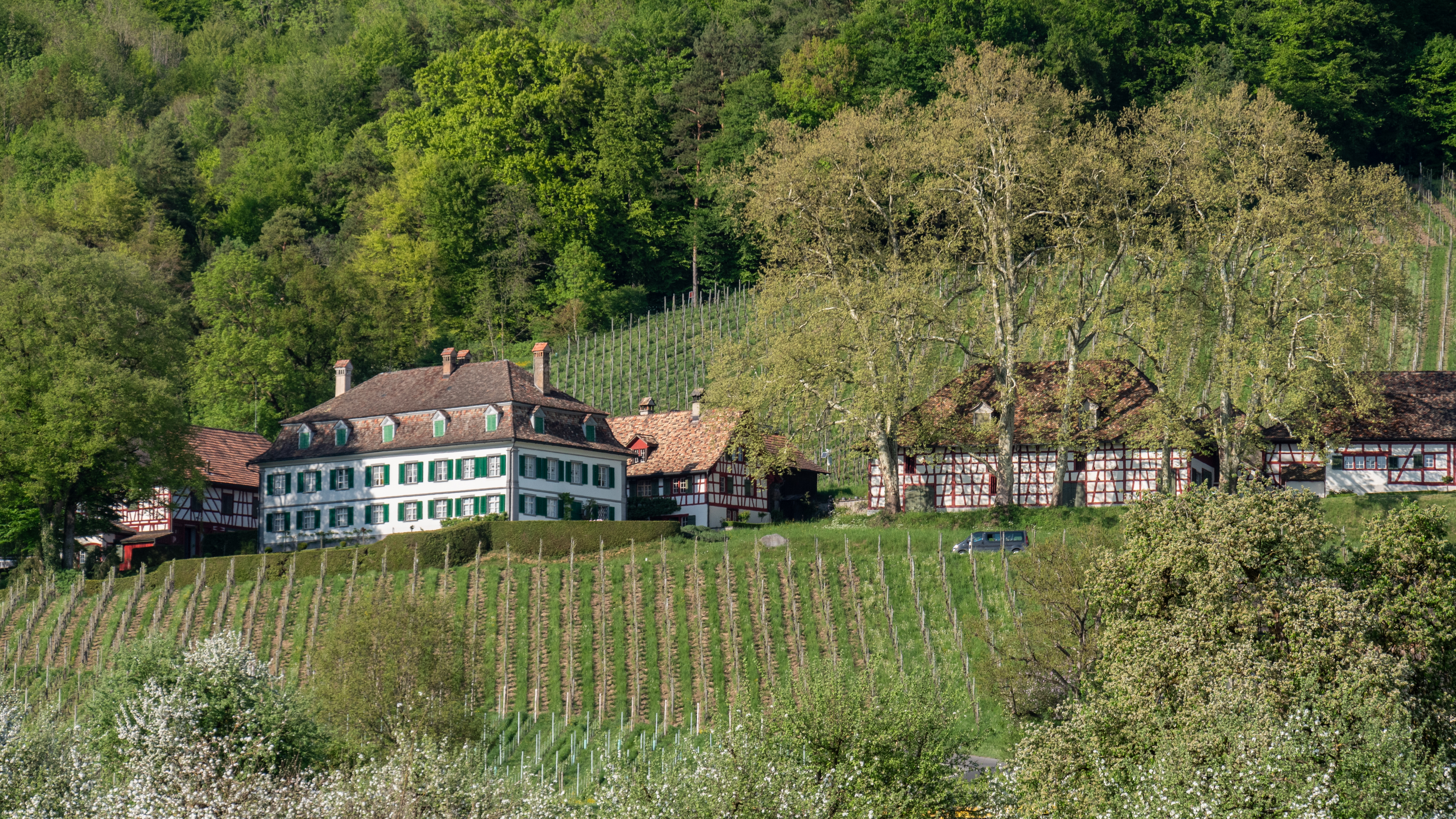
Bachtobel Castle

== Economy ==
As of 2007, Weinfelden had an unemployment rate of 1.82%. As of 2005, there were 164 people employed in the primary economic sector and about 55 businesses involved in this sector. 1,908 people are employed in the secondary sector and there are 123 businesses in this sector. 4,380 people are employed in the tertiary sector, with 489 businesses in this sector. In 2000 there were 6,210 workers who lived in the municipality. Of these, 2,187 or about 35.2% of the residents worked outside Weinfelden while 4,071 people commuted into the municipality for work. There were a total of 8,094 jobs (of at least 6 hours per week) in the municipality. Of the working population, 12.3% used public transportation to get to work, and 40.1% used a private car.

== Religion ==
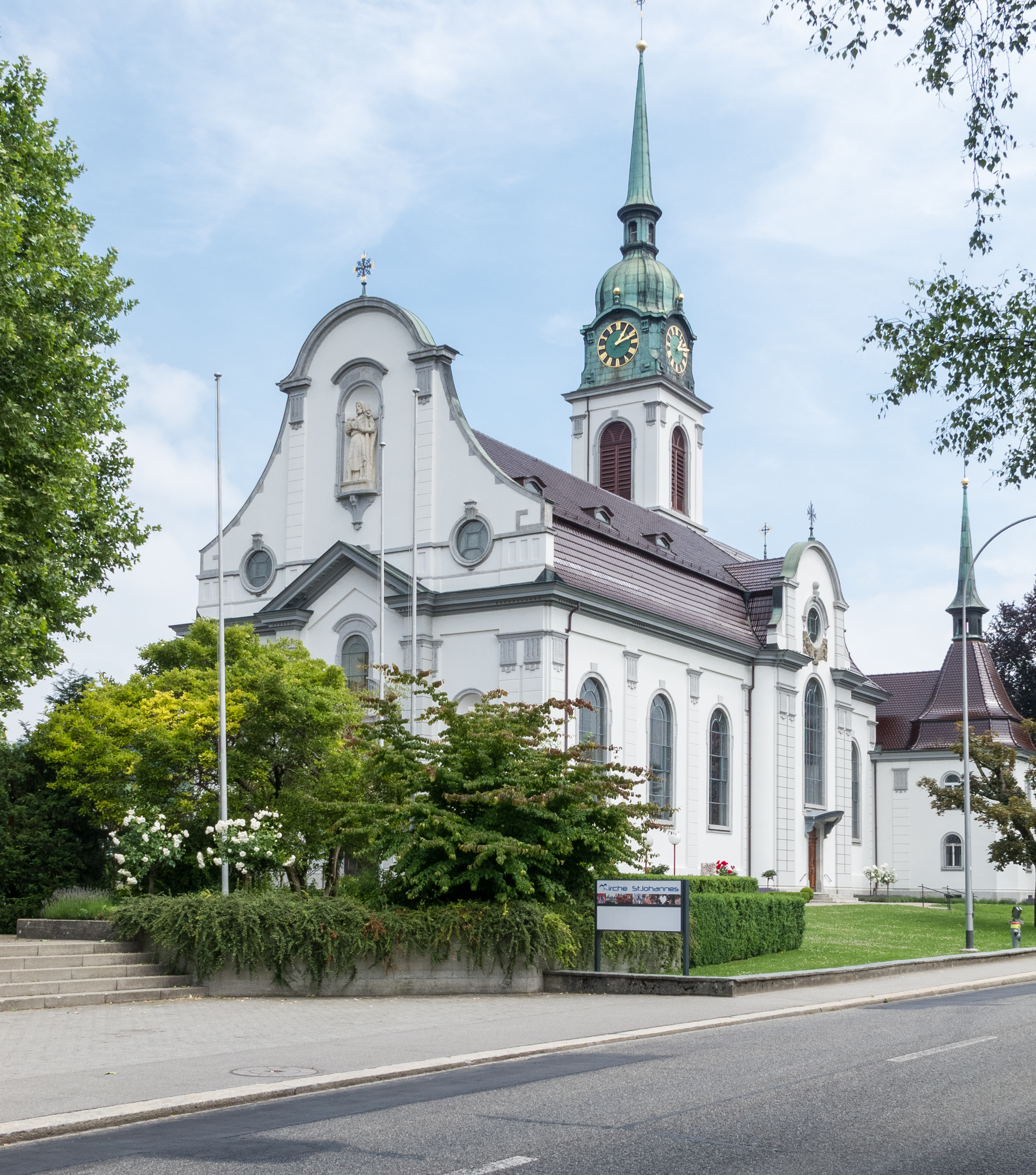
Catholic Church

From the 2000 census, 3,087 or 32.6% were Roman Catholic, while 4,271 or 45.2% belonged to the Swiss Reformed Church. Of the rest of the population, there were 4 Old Catholics (or about 0.04% of the population) who belonged to the Christian Catholic Church of Switzerland there are 128 individuals (or about 1.35% of the population) who belong to the Orthodox Church, and there are 412 individuals (or about 4.36% of the population) who belong to another Christian church. There were 13 individuals (or about 0.14% of the population) who were Jewish, and 599 (or about 6.33% of the population) who are Islamic. There are 96 individuals (or about 1.02% of the population) who belong to another church (not listed on the census), 536 (or about 5.67% of the population) belong to no church, are agnostic or atheist, and 310 individuals (or about 3.28% of the population) did not answer the question.

== Weather ==
Weinfelden has an average of 130.7 days of rain or snow per year and on average receives 929 mm (36.6 in) of precipitation. The wettest month is June during which time Weinfelden receives an average of 109 mm (4.3 in) of rain or snow. During this month there is precipitation for an average of 12.1 days. The month with the most days of precipitation is May, with an average of 12.9, but with only 97 mm (3.8 in) of rain or snow. The driest month of the year is March with an average of 57 mm (2.2 in) of precipitation over 12.1 days.

== Education ==
In Weinfelden about 67.6% of the population (between age 25-64) have completed either non-mandatory upper secondary education or additional higher education (either university or a Fachhochschule). Weinfelden is home to the Regionalbibliothek Weinfelden library.

== Transport ==
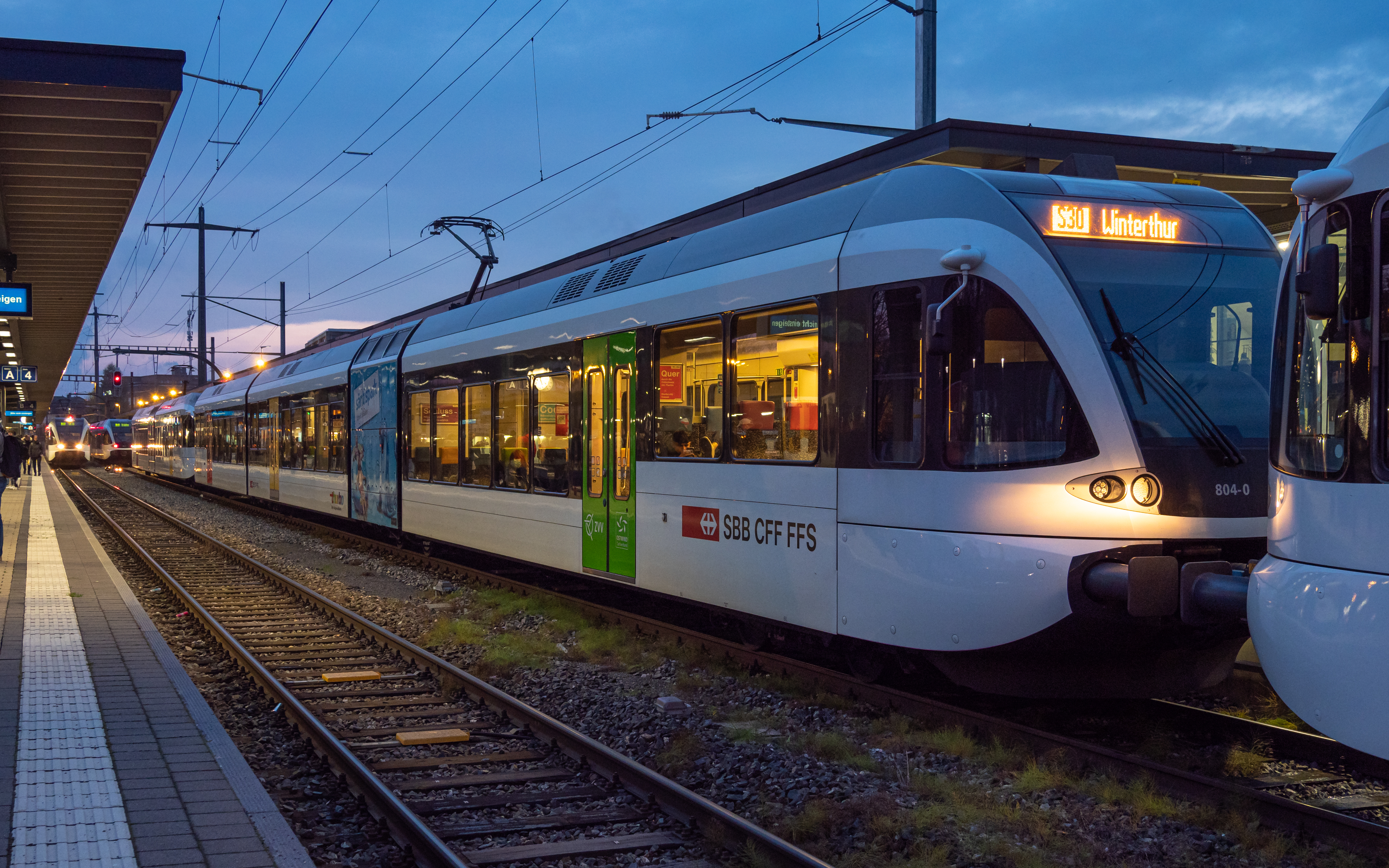
Local trains of Thurbo at Weinfelden railway station

Weinfelden railway station is a terminal station of the Zürich S-Bahn on services S24 and S30. The town is the most significant railway junction in the Canton of Thurgau. Because of its geographic position there are trains to all corners of the Canton, including Frauenfeld and further to Zürich, Kreuzlingen and further to Konstanz in Germany, Romanshorn and Wil.

== Notable people ==
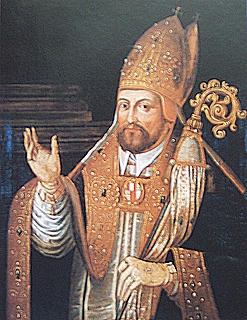
Johann Otto von Gemmingen

- Johann Otto von Gemmingen (1545–1598) the Bishop of Augsburg from 1591 to 1598, brought up in Weinfelden Castle
- Heinrich Häberlin (1868 in Weinfelden – 1947) a Swiss politician, judge and member of the Swiss Federal Council 1920-1934
- Heinz Rutishauser (1918 in Weinfelden – 1970) a Swiss mathematician and a pioneer of modern numerical mathematics and computer science.
- August von Finck Jr. (born 1930) a Swiss-based German billionaire businessman, lives in Weinfelden Castle
- Peter Stamm (born 1963) a Swiss writer of prose, radio drama, and plays in a cool and sparse style; brought up in Weinfelden
- Brenda Mäder (born 1986) a young Swiss politician, brought up in Weinfelden
