= Bürglen, Thurgau =

Bürglen
- Municipality
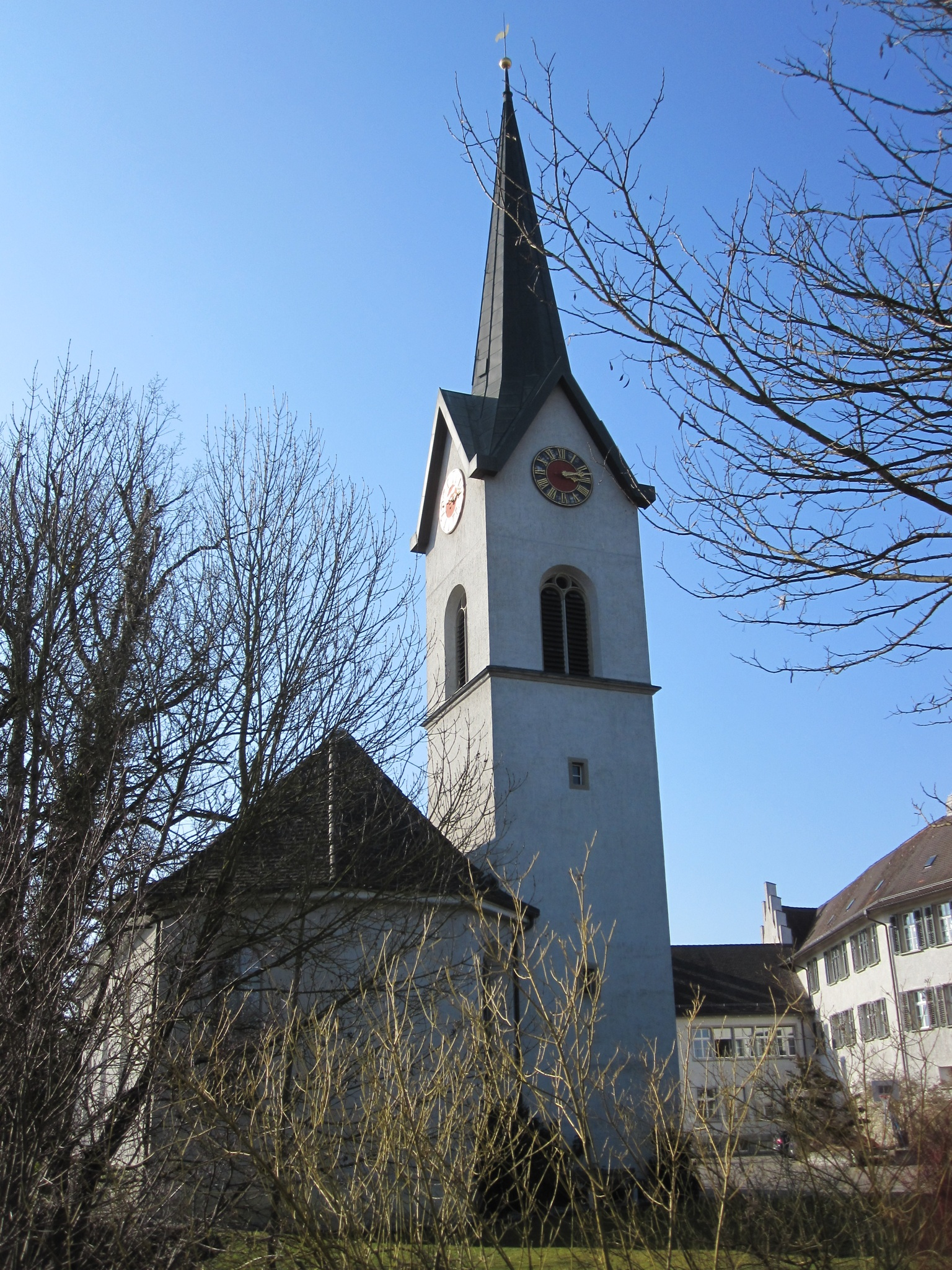

- Coat of arms
- Location of Bürglen
- Location within Switzerland Location within Canton of Thurgau
- Coordinates: 47°33′N 9°9′E
- Country: Switzerland
- Canton: Thurgau
- District: Weinfelden

Area
  - Total: 11.7 km^{2} (4.5 sq mi)
- Elevation: 441 m (1,447 ft)

Population (December 2007)
  - Total: 3,092
  - Density: 264/km^{2} (684/sq mi)
- Time zone: UTC+01:00 (CET)
  - Summer (DST): UTC+02:00 (CEST)
- Postal code: 8575
- SFOS number: 4911
- ISO 3166 code: CH-TG
- Surrounded by: Berg, Birwinken, Bussnang, Kradolf-Schönenberg, Schönholzerswilen, Sulgen, Weinfelden
- Website: www.buerglen-tg.ch

Bürglen is a municipality in the district of Weinfelden in the canton of Thurgau in Switzerland.

== History ==
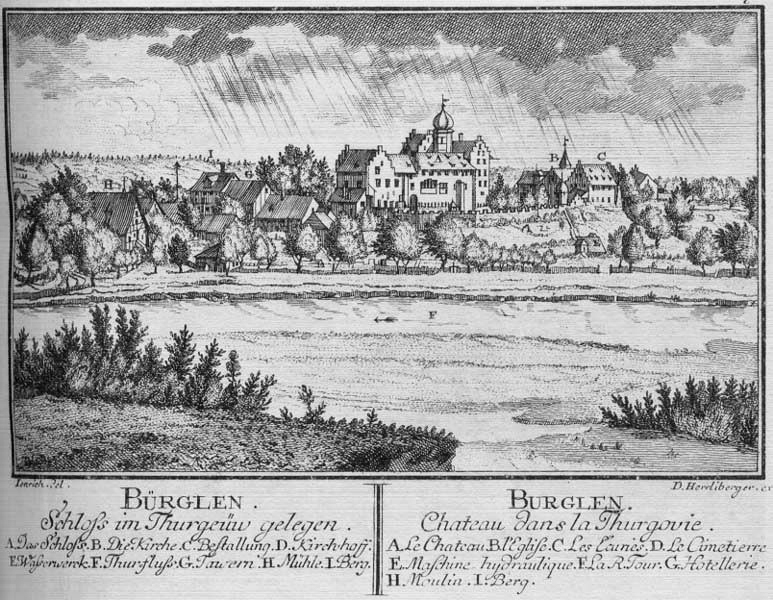
Bürglen Castle

Bürglen is first mentioned in 1282-84 as Burgelon. A Freiherr of Bürglen is first mentioned in 1176. By 1350, the land around the village had all been brought under a single noble and became the Herrschaft of Bürglen. Then, in 1408, the Herrschaft was acquired by the Lords of Klingenberg. The land transferred in 1443 to Marquart Brisacher from Constance and then in 1447, it went to the Baron of Sax-Hohensax. That family had owned in property in Bürglen since 1360. By 1500 they had built it up to become the center of their power. However, in 1550 they had to sell it to the Breitenlandenberg family, who, in turn, ceded it in 1579 to the city of St. Gallen. The village was managed, until 1798, by a St. Gallen appointed Vogt. The Vogt ruled over the low court of Bürglen, Uerenbohl, Guntershausen (now Guntershausen bei Berg), Heldswil, Mettlen and Istighofen and parts of Hüttenschwil and Sulgen. In addition, after 1580 it included Mühlebach (now Mühlebach bei Amriswil), followed in 1647 by Bleiken, in 1664, Hessenreuti and finally in 1665, Amriswil.

Even though the village was fortified around 1300, it was never considered a city. This was due to the decline of the Baron and competition from other neighboring villages. After the disastrous fire in 1528, the villagers went into debt to the Herrschaft for the reconstruction of the village. To help pay off the debt, in 1540 they granted the Herrschaft rights to the common land. Under St. Gallen, the village lost most of their autonomy. St. Gallen appointed the Ammann and the chairman of the Lower Court, promoted the settlement of its citizens to form a local elite, and changed the succession order in inheritances. However, the local farmers enjoyed a certain independence, and in the 17th century they promoted the expansion of the castle as well as the creation of new businesses. This relative prosperity was followed in the 18th century, by a government practice that hindered the formation of viable village government and led to general impoverishment.

Aerial view (1957)

The village belonged to the parish of Sulgen. By 1274, a village priest was mentioned and in 1346 the castle chapel was finished. The St. Leonhard chapel was first mentioned in 1504, but is of an earlier origin. The Hell Chapel was first mentioned in 1585 and burned down in 1695. Presumably both chapels were in use until the late 17th century. After the Protestant Reformation of 1529 the court returned to the Catholic faith, while the village remained Reformed. After St. Gallen acquired the rights to appoint a priest and collect tithes in 1585 from the Convent of St. Pelagius in Bischofszell, the village church was supported by Sulgen's church. This changed in 1617 when Neukirch an der Thur began providing a priest, and then in 1676, the priest was appointed by the castle. In 1809 an independent Reformed parish of Bürglen-Andwil was formed.

== Geography ==
Bürglen has an area, as of 2009, of 11.68 square kilometers (4.51 sq mi). Of this area, 7.25 km^{2} (2.80 sq mi) or 62.1% is used for agricultural purposes, while 2.04 km^{2} (0.79 sq mi) or 17.5% is forested. Of the rest of the land, 2.02 km^{2} (0.78 sq mi) or 17.3% is settled (buildings or roads), 0.3 km^{2} (0.12 sq mi) or 2.6% is either rivers or lakes and 0.06 km^{2} (15 acres) or 0.5% is unproductive land.

Of the built up area, industrial buildings made up 5.7% of the total area while housing and buildings made up 2.5% and transportation infrastructure made up 3.8%. while parks, green belts and sports fields made up 5.2%. Out of the forested land, 16.2% of the total land area is heavily forested and 1.3% is covered with orchards or small clusters of trees. Of the agricultural land, 55.7% is used for growing crops, while 6.4% is used for orchards or vine crops. All the water in the municipality is flowing water.

The municipality is located in the Weinfelden district. It was created in 1995 from the former Ortsgemeinden of Bürglen, Leimbach and Opfershofen of the former Munizipalgemeinde of Bürglen as well as Istighofen, which used to be part of Bussnang. The Ortsgemeinden of Donzhausen, Hessenreuti and Uerenbohl, which used to belong to the Munizipalgemeinde of Bürglen, became part of Sulgen in 1995.

== Demographics ==
Bürglen has a population (as of December 2020) of 3,953. As of 2008, 25.2% of the population are foreign nationals. Over the last 10 years (1997–2007) the population has changed at a rate of -8.7%. Most of the population (as of 2000) speaks German (84.1%), with Albanian being second most common ( 5.9%) and Turkish being third ( 3.1%).

As of 2008, the gender distribution of the population was 49.9% male and 50.1% female. The population was made up of 1,160 Swiss men (36.5% of the population), and 426 (13.4%) non-Swiss men. There were 1,218 Swiss women (38.3%), and 374 (11.8%) non-Swiss women.

In 2008 there were 16 live births to Swiss citizens and 9 births to non-Swiss citizens, and in same time span there were 15 deaths of Swiss citizens and 2 non-Swiss citizen deaths. Ignoring immigration and emigration, the population of Swiss citizens increased by 1 while the foreign population increased by 7. There were 3 Swiss men who emigrated from Switzerland to another country, 28 non-Swiss men who emigrated from Switzerland to another country and 21 non-Swiss women who emigrated from Switzerland to another country. The total Swiss population change in 2008 (from all sources) was an increase of 53 and the non-Swiss population change was an increase of 23 people. This represents a population growth rate of 2.5%.

The age distribution, as of 2009, in Bürglen is; 285 children or 8.9% of the population are between 0 and 9 years old and 411 teenagers or 12.8% are between 10 and 19. Of the adult population, 515 people or 16.0% of the population are between 20 and 29 years old. 385 people or 12.0% are between 30 and 39, 537 people or 16.7% are between 40 and 49, and 477 people or 14.8% are between 50 and 59. The senior population distribution is 287 people or 8.9% of the population are between 60 and 69 years old, 189 people or 5.9% are between 70 and 79, there are 112 people or 3.5% who are between 80 and 89, and there are 15 people or 0.5% who are 90 and older.

As of 2000, there were 1,233 private households in the municipality, and an average of 2.6 persons per household. In 2000 there were 406 single family homes (or 73.2% of the total) out of a total of 555 inhabited buildings. There were 48 two family buildings (8.6%), 27 three family buildings (4.9%) and 74 multi-family buildings (or 13.3%). There were 642 (or 20.1%) persons who were part of a couple without children, and 1,943 (or 60.8%) who were part of a couple with children. There were 109 (or 3.4%) people who lived in single parent home, while there are 23 persons who were adult children living with one or both parents, 20 persons who lived in a household made up of relatives, 25 who lived in a household made up of unrelated persons, and 52 who are either institutionalized or live in another type of collective housing.

The vacancy rate for the municipality, in 2008, was 2.93%. As of 2007, the construction rate of new housing units was 1 new units per 1000 residents. In 2000 there were 1,436 apartments in the municipality. The most common apartment size was the 4 room apartment of which there were 391. There were 45 single room apartments and 204 apartments with six or more rooms.

In the 2007 federal election the most popular party was the SVP which received 39.9% of the vote. The next three most popular parties were the CVP (21.15%), the FDP (13%) and the SP (9.27%). In the federal election, a total of 807 votes were cast, and the voter turnout was 41.6%.

The historical population is given in the following table:

year	population
1450	c. 250
1634	153
1682	435
1797	420
1850	442
1900	1,238
1950	1,714
1990	2,323
2000	3,197

== Sights ==
The entire city of Bürglen is designated as part of the Inventory of Swiss Heritage Sites.

== Economy ==
As of 2007, Bürglen had an unemployment rate of 1.89%. As of 2005, there were 132 people employed in the primary economic sector and about 46 businesses involved in this sector. 483 people are employed in the secondary sector and there are 50 businesses in this sector. 648 people are employed in the tertiary sector, with 110 businesses in this sector.

In 2000 there were 2,291 workers who lived in the municipality. Of these, 1,194 or about 52.1% of the residents worked outside Bürglen while 718 people commuted into the municipality for work. There were a total of 1,815 jobs (of at least 6 hours per week) in the municipality. Of the working population, 10.7% used public transportation to get to work, and 51.1% used a private car.

== Religion ==
From the 2000 census, 964 or 30.2% were Roman Catholic, while 1,320 or 41.3% belonged to the Swiss Reformed Church. Of the rest of the population, there are 81 individuals (or about 2.53% of the population) who belong to the Orthodox Church, and there are 115 individuals (or about 3.60% of the population) who belong to another Christian church. There were 2 individuals (or about 0.06% of the population) who were Jewish, and 446 (or about 13.95% of the population) who are Islamic. There are 4 individuals (or about 0.13% of the population) who belong to another church (not listed on the census), 161 (or about 5.04% of the population) belong to no church, are agnostic or atheist, and 104 individuals (or about 3.25% of the population) did not answer the question.

== Education ==
The entire Swiss population is generally well educated. In Bürglen about 61% of the population (between age 25–64) have completed either non-mandatory upper secondary education or additional higher education (either university or a Fachhochschule).

Bürglen is home to the Bürglen primary and secondary school district. In the 2008/2009 school year there were 278 students. There were 56 children in the kindergarten, and the average class size was 18.67 kindergartners. Of the children in kindergarten, 29 or 51.8% were female, 25 or 44.6% were not Swiss citizens and 25 or 44.6% did not speak German natively. The lower and upper primary levels begin at about age 5-6 and last for 6 years. There were 96 children in who were at the lower primary level and 126 children in the upper primary level. The average class size in the primary school was 20.3 students. At the lower primary level, there were 52 children or 54.2% of the total population who were female, 38 or 39.6% were not Swiss citizens and 37 or 38.5% did not speak German natively. In the upper primary level, there were 61 or 48.4% who were female, 31 or 24.6% were not Swiss citizens and 33 or 26.2% did not speak German natively.

At the secondary level, students are divided according to performance. The secondary level begins at about age 12 and usually lasts 3 years. There were 183 teenagers who were in special or remedial classes, of which 69 or 37.7% were female, 56 or 30.6% were not Swiss citizens and 67 or 36.6% did not speak German natively.

== See also ==
- Bürglen railway station
