= Weinfelden District =

Coordinates: 47.5667°N 9.1°E

Weinfelden District Bezirk Weinfelden
- District
- Country: Switzerland
- Canton: Thurgau
- Capital: Weinfelden

Area
  - Total: 227.2 km^{2} (87.7 sq mi)

Population (2020)
  - Total: 56,677
  - Density: 249.5/km^{2} (646.1/sq mi)
- Time zone: UTC+1 (CET)
  - Summer (DST): UTC+2 (CEST)
- Municipalities: 18

Weinfelden District is one of the five districts of the canton of Thurgau, Switzerland. It has a population of 56,677 (as of 31 December 2020). Its capital is the town of Weinfelden.

The district contains the following municipalities:

Coat of arms	Municipality	Population (31 December 2020)	Area km^{2}
	Affeltrangen	2,648	14.44
	Amlikon-Bissegg	1,332	14.4
	Berg	3,429	13.1
	Birwinken	1,330	12.3
	Bischofszell	5,907	11.7
	Bürglen	3,953	11.7
	Bussnang	2,473	19.0
	Erlen	3,802	12.2
	Hauptwil-Gottshaus	2,017	12.5
	Hohentannen	612	8.0
	Kradolf-Schönenberg	3,677	10.9
	Märstetten	2,896	9.9
	Schönholzerswilen	839	10.94
	Sulgen	3,957	9.1
	Weinfelden	11,629	15.5
	Wigoltingen	2,558	17.2
	Wuppenau	1,135	12.15
	Zihlschlacht-Sitterdorf	2,483	12.2
	Total (18)	56,677	227.2
