= Appenzell District =

Appenzell District Bezirk Appenzell
- District
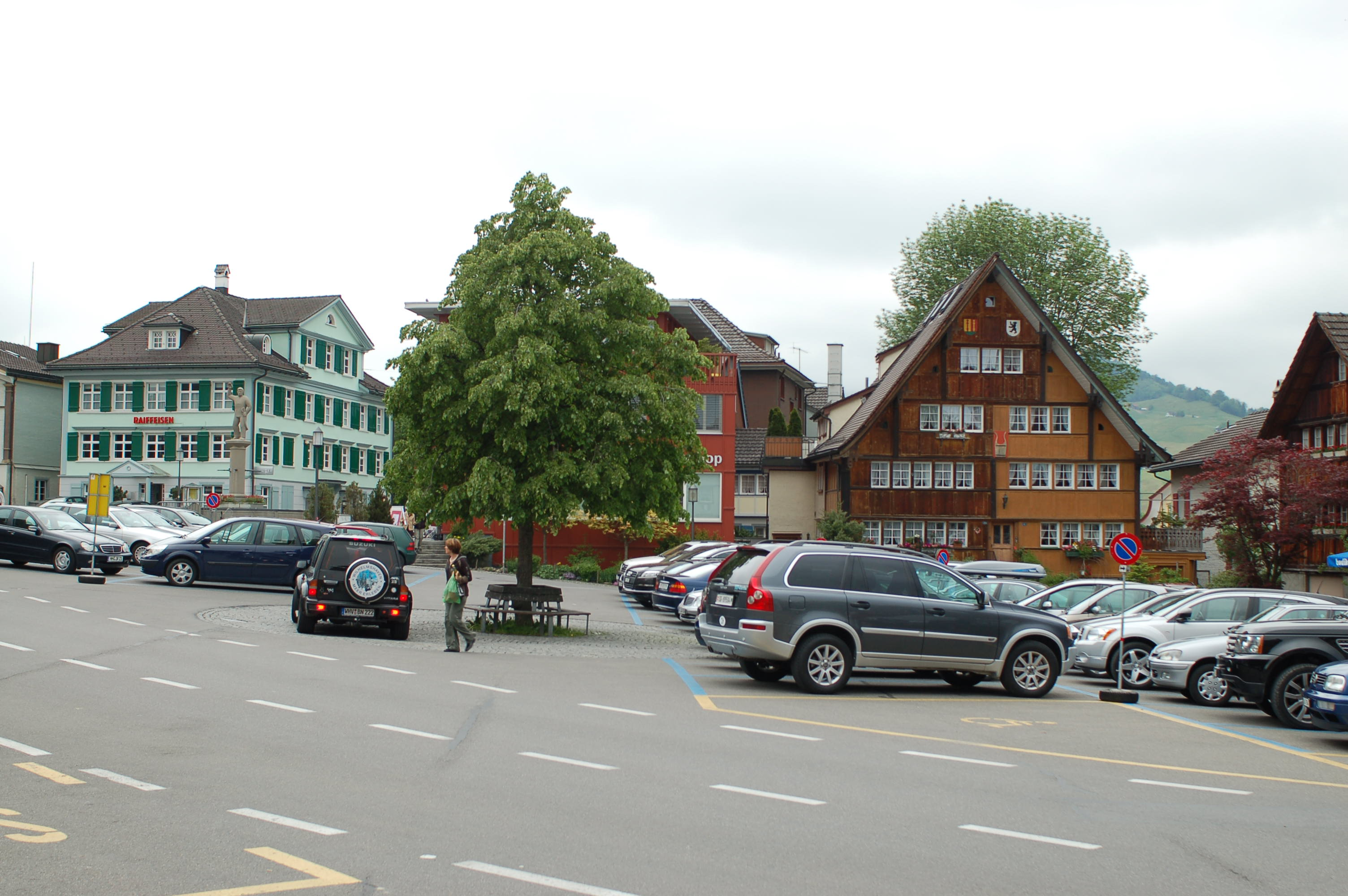

- Flag Coat of arms
- Coordinates: 47°20′N 9°25′E
- Country: Switzerland
- Canton: Appenzell Innerrhoden
- Capital: Appenzell (town)

Area
  - Total: 16.9 km^{2} (6.5 sq mi)
- Elevation: 780 m (2,560 ft)

Population (December 2020)
  - Total: 5,793
  - Density: 343/km^{2} (888/sq mi)
- Time zone: UTC+1 (CET)
  - Summer (DST): UTC+2 (CEST)
- Postal code: 9050
- SFOS number: 3101
- Municipalities: None
- Website: www.appenzell.org

Appenzell District is a district of the canton of Appenzell Innerrhoden in Switzerland. It has a population of 5,793 (as of December 2020). The area of Appenzell is 16.88 km^{2} (7 sq mi). The district of Appenzell consists of a part of the village Appenzell, as well as Rinkenbach, Kau and Meistersrüte.

== History ==
=== Prehistoric Appenzell ===
While a single late Bronze Age site has been discovered in the forest outside Appenzell, there is no evidence of a prehistoric settlement. The region around Appenzell remained forested and very lightly settled until the end of the Early Middle Ages.

=== Under the Abbots of St. Gall ===
Under the authority of the abbots of the monastery of St. Gall settlers began to colonization of the Sitter river valley in the late 11th century. It is mentioned, in a deed granting rights to clear land, in 1071 as Abbacella. At the same time, the parish of St. Mauritius was established. By 1200, the parish included the area of the modern district as well as villages of Brenden, Lank, Lehn and Meistersrüte. The meager records before 1500 does not allow accurate reconstruction of the early residential development. It is likely that the first village houses were along the road between church and abbot's farm, which was built at what is now Reichsstrasse near the Gansbach stream. This gave the early village an east–west orientation. East of the church the Metzibrücke bridge was built over the Sitter. This led to the extension of the village across the river. The eastern end of the village was a conglomerate of economic and administrative buildings.

In 1291, Appenzell was devastated by the troops of the Count of Werdenberg-Sargans.

In 1353, it was granted the market right and an open plaza, the Schmäuslemarkt, opened to the south of the main street and opposite from the town hall. At the same time, a row of houses grew up to line the Hauptgasse and Hirschengasse streets. The latter road (Hirschengasse) was added as a major cross street running in the north–south direction. Additional connecting roads, squares and open areas were built at around the same time. The village of Ried, south of the village center, was founded in 1483 as a charitable foundation for poor villagers.

As the village began to grow in power it began to be mentioned as a separate entity from the rest of the abbatis cella (meaning the cell (i.e. estate) of the abbot). Starting on 10 November 1367, and often in the 15th century, the village and court are called Hof to distinguish it from the rest of ze Appacelle. The villagers of Appenzell are still known as Hofer, to distinguish them from the surrounding farmers.

Starting in the 14th century, a variety of craftsmen and traders lived and worked in Appenzell. The Answer and Mandate Book of 1547 includes regulations and controls for farmers, millers and butchers. The number of fairs was increased to two on 23 September 1353 and the village was given the right to collect tolls. In the 15th century there is evidence of a tavern in Appenzell village and a set of weights and measures for regulating commercial activities.

By about 1360, conflicts over grazing rights, taxes, and tithes were causing concern for both the abbot and the farmers of Appenzell. Both parties wanted to protect their rights and interests by joining the new Swabian League. In 1377 Appenzell was allowed to join the League with the support of the cities of Konstanz and St. Gallen (the city of St. Gallen was often at odds with the neighboring Abbey of St. Gall). With the support of League, Appenzell refused to pay many of the gifts and tithes that the Abbot Kuno von Stoffeln demanded. In response to the loss of revenue from his estates, Kuno approached the Austrian House of Habsburg for help. In 1392 he made an agreement with the Habsburgs, which was renewed in 1402. In response, in 1401 Appenzell entered into an alliance with the city of St. Gallen to protect their rights and freedom.

=== Part of the Swiss Confederation ===
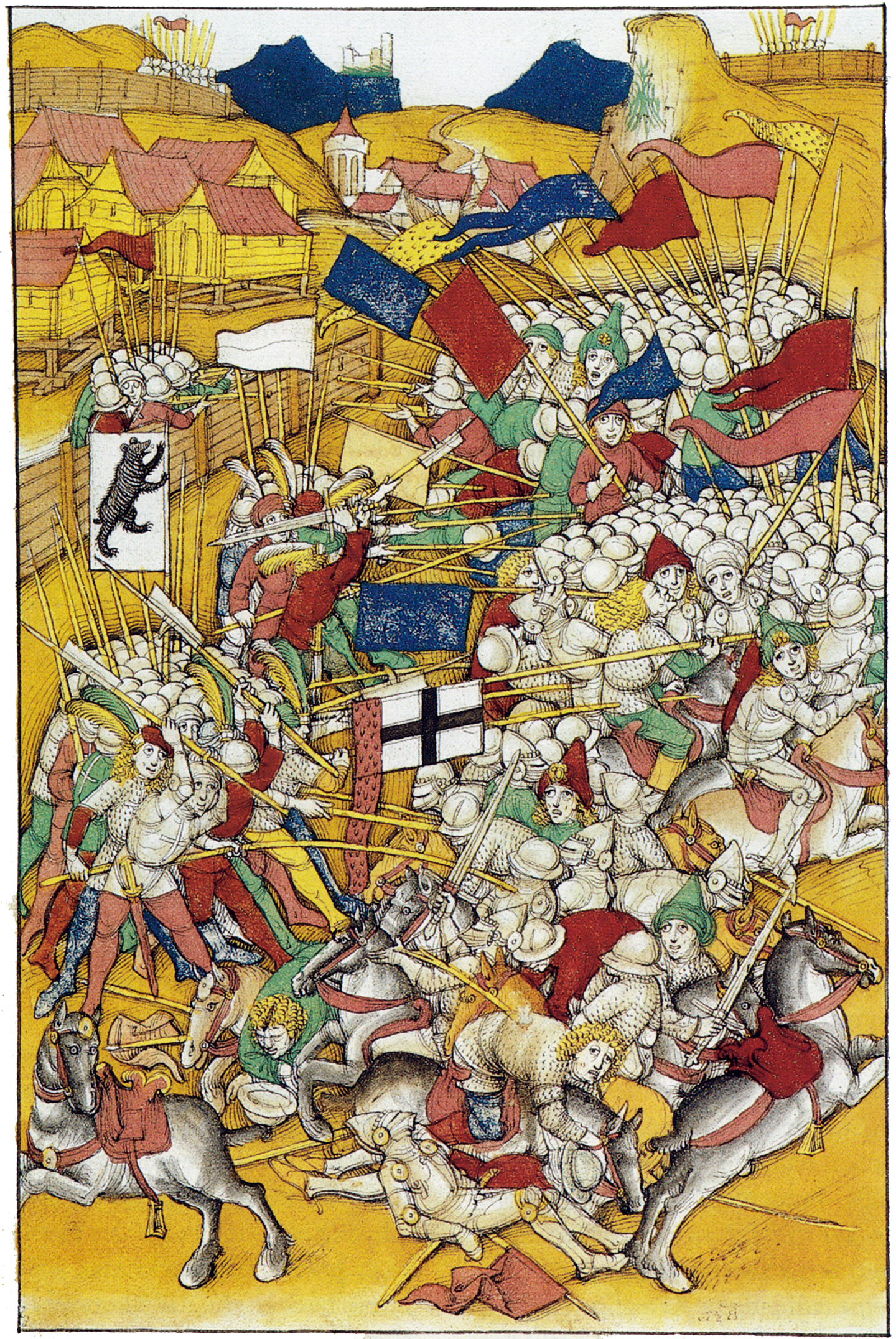
Battle of Vögelinsegg

Following increasing conflicts between the Appenzellers the abbot's agents, including the bailiff of Appenzell demanding that a dead body be dug up because he wanted the man's clothes, the Appenzellers planned an uprising. On a certain day, throughout the abbot's lands, they attacked the bailiffs and drove them out of the land. Following unsuccessful negotiations Appenzell and St. Gallen entered into a treaty. The treaty between St. Gallen and Appenzell marked a break between the abbot and his estates. Perhaps fearing the Habsburgs, in 1402 the League expelled Appenzell. During the same year, St. Gallen reached an agreement with the abbot and Appenzell could no longer count on St. Gallen's support. Appenzell declared itself ready to stand against the abbot, and in 1403 formed an alliance with the Canton of Schwyz, a member of the Old Swiss Confederation that had defeated the Austrians in the last century. Glarus provided less support, but authorized any citizen who wished to support Appenzell to do so. In response, the League raised an army and marched to St. Gallen before heading toward Appenzell. On 15 May 1403, they entered the pass to Speicher and outside the village of Vögelinsegg met the Appenzell army. A small force of Appenzell and Confederation troops defeated the League army and signed a short lived peace treaty.

Following another Appenzell victory on 17 June 1405, at Stoss Pass on the border of Appenzell village, the new canton continued to expand. During the expansion, Appenzell had even captured the abbot of St Gall and in response they were excommunicated by the Bishop of Constance.

However, while the Bund expanded the Austrians used the peace to regain their strength. On September 11, 1406, an association of nobles formed a knightly order known as the Sankt Jörgenschild (Order of St. George's Shield) to oppose the rebellious commoners of the Bund. Following a defeat at Bregenz, Appenzell was unable to hold the Bund together. The city of St. Gallen and the Canton of Schwyz each paid off the Austrians to avoid an attack, and the Bund was dissolved by King Rupert on April 4, 1408.

As part of the peace treaty, the abbot gave up his ownership of Appenzell, but was still owned certain taxes. However, it wasn't until 1410 that the area was at peace.

In 1411 Appenzell signed a defensive treaty with the entire Swiss Confederation (except Bern), which strengthened their position against the abbot. Appenzell joined the Confederation as an "Associate Member", and wouldn't become a full member until 1513. Following another battle, in 1429, Appenzell was granted freedom from the obligations in the future. This treaty represented the end of Appenzell's last financial tie to the Abbey of St. Gall, and a movement to closer relationships with the Confederation.

By no later than the end of the 1440s Appenzell provided linen to the embroidery factories of the city of St. Gallen. Later Appenzell began to establish independent foreign trade relations (1494 Venice, 1497 Constance, about 1499 Lyon, 1529 Frankfurt am Main). Starting in the last quarter of the 15th century there was a weekly yarn and weaving market held in village. However, efforts to create an independent cloth weaving and embroidery industry in Appenzell failed repeatedly in the face of tough competition from the city of St. Gallen.

=== Division of the Appenzell ===
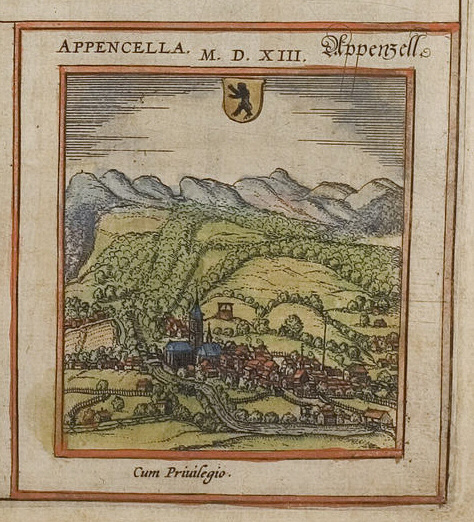
Appenzell in the 16th century

On 18 March 1560 the village was destroyed by fire. It was rebuilt mostly using the old foundations and following the pre-fire roads. The reconstruction was considered the most part of the old homesteads and foundations.

Following the division of Appenzell into two half cantons in 1597, Appenzell village lost much of its importance as the capital.

Fires partially destroyed the village in 1679 and again in 1701. Most of the notable buildings, were built in the 16th century. The parish church is from 1560 to 1584, the ossuary in 1560–65 and the Rathaus (city hall) in 1560–83. On the southeastern edge of village, the so-called Castle was built in 1563–70 and the armory was built around 1568. The Capuchin monastery was built in 1587–88 financial statements, followed by the Capuchin nunnery in 1611–22. A comparison of historic views (from 1586, 1642 and 1839) shows that the size and structure of the village did not change between the 16th century and the mid-19th century.

In the 16th–18th centuries, foreign military service played an important role in the economy of the village. Numerous families (especially the Sutter, Bischofberger, Büchler, Knusert and Ulmann) grew to dominate the foreign mercenary industry in the village.

=== Creation of the Appenzell district ===
The district was formally established in 1872 by joining the rhodes Lehn and Rinkenbach.

== Coat of arms ==
The coat of arms shows an upright black bear with red claws on a silver background. The bear holds a red ring between its forepaws. This ring is the hamlet ring, representing the market village of Appenzell.

The blazon of the municipal coat of arms is Argent a bear Sable langued, armed and priapic in his virility Gules between his front paws an Annulet of the same.

== Geography ==
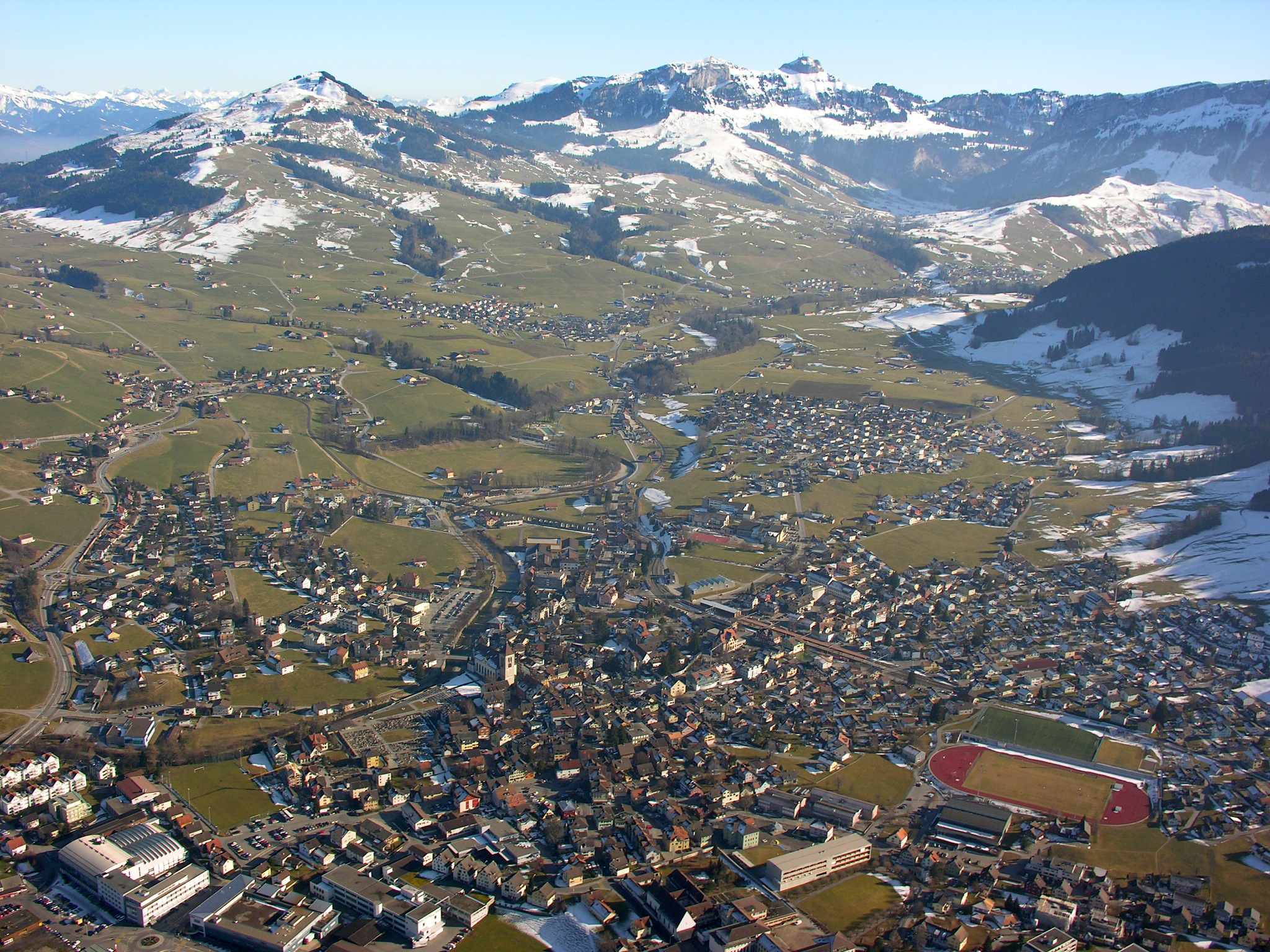
Aerial view of Appenzell

Appenzell has an area, as of 2011, of 16.9 square kilometers (6.5 sq mi). Of this area, 66.6% is used for agricultural purposes, while 22.0% is forested. Of the rest of the land, 10.7% is settled (buildings or roads) and 0.7% is unproductive land.

The district (equivalent to a municipality in other cantons) is the capital of the half canton of Appenzell Innerrhoden. It also includes the Feuerschaugemeinde (fire-fighting municipality), Kirchgemeinde (parish) and Schulgemeinde (school district). The village of Appenzell is located in the center of the Sitter river valley on the eastern border of the district. It borders the districts of Rüte (north of the Sitter) and Schwende (south of the Sitter).

== Demographics ==
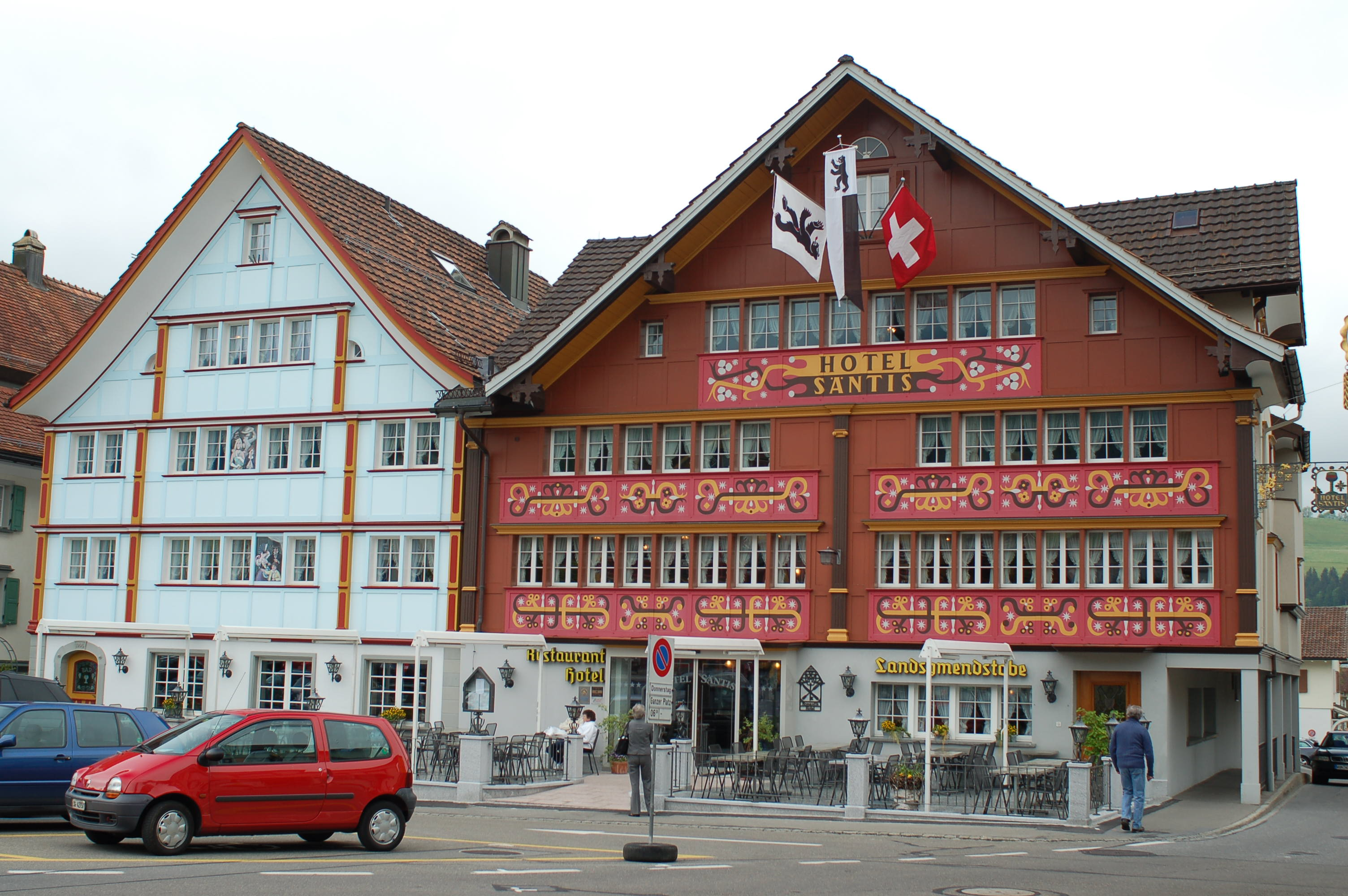
Hotel and buildings in Appenzell

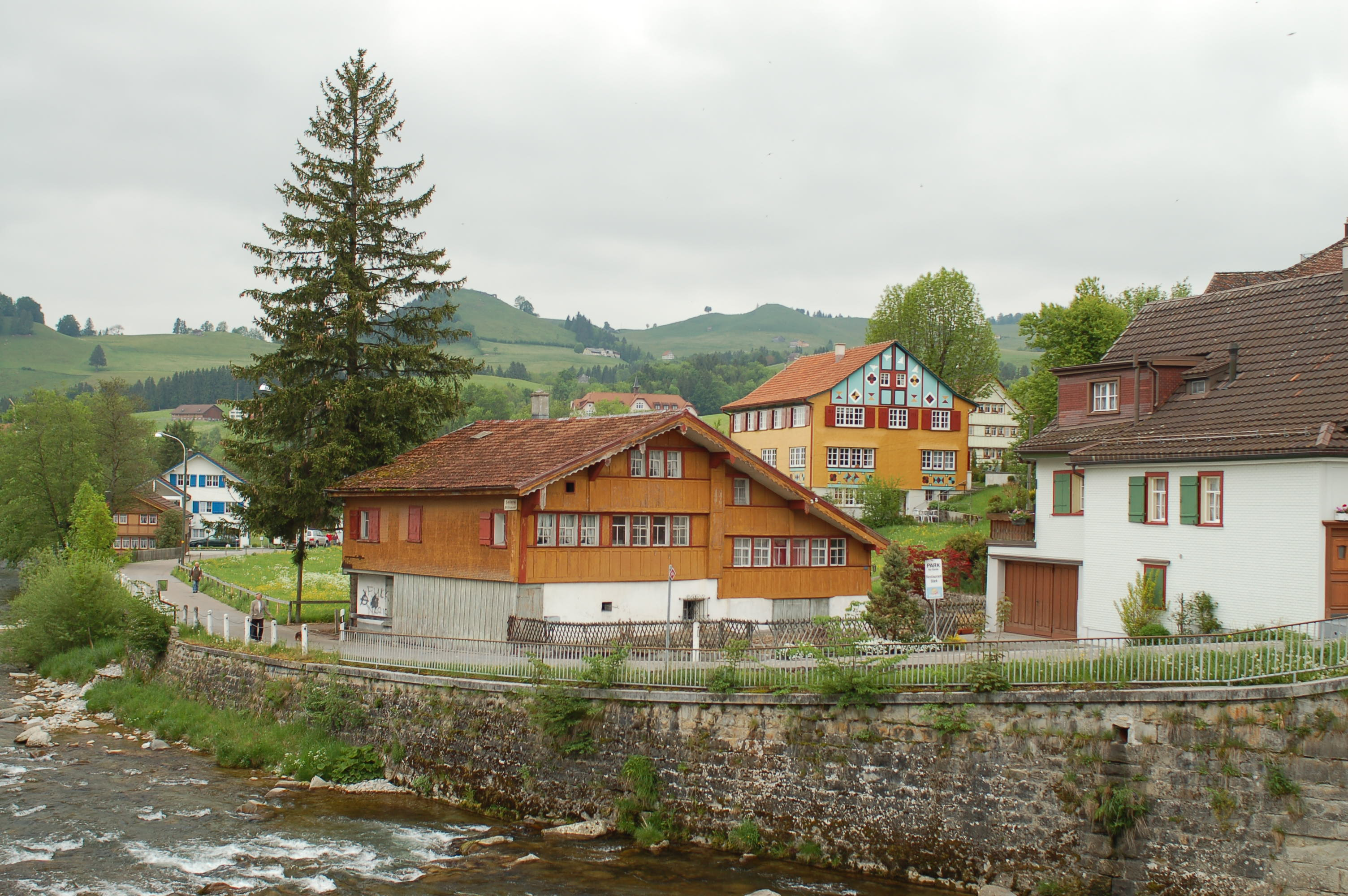
Houses along the Sitter

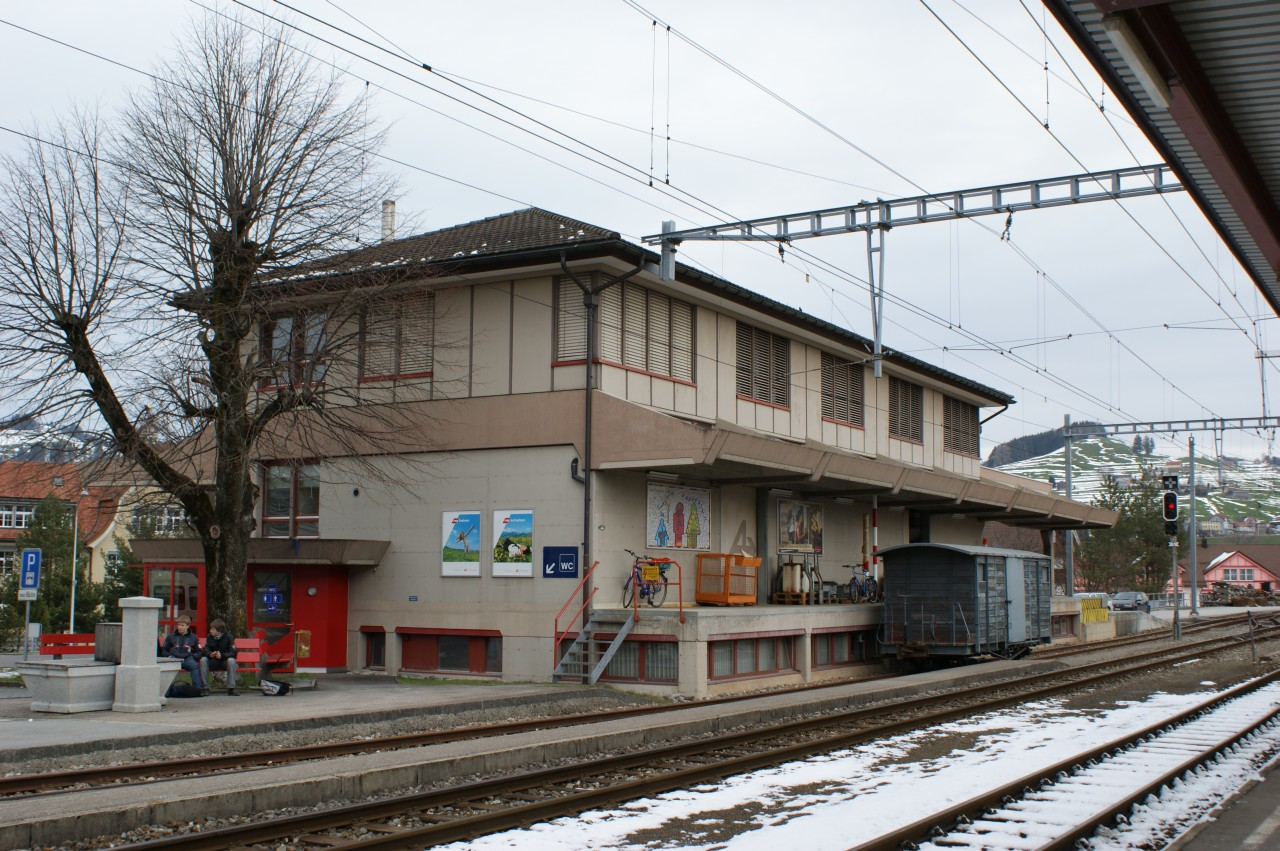
Former warehouse at the Appenzell train station

Appenzell has a population (as of December 2020) of 5,793. As of 2008, 18.0% of the population are resident foreign nationals. Over the last 10 years (1999–2009) the population has changed at a rate of 4.8%. It has changed at a rate of 6.1% due to migration and at a rate of 5.7% due to births and deaths.

Most of the population (as of 2000) speaks German (4,723 or 86.7%), with Serbo-Croatian being second most common (302 or 5.5%) and Italian being third (98 or 1.8%). There are 14 people who speak French and 3 people who speak Romansh.

Of the population in the district 2,794 or about 51.3% were born in Appenzell and lived there in 2000. There were 486 or 8.9% who were born in the same canton, while 1,115 or 20.5% were born somewhere else in Switzerland, and 1,018 or 18.7% were born outside of Switzerland.

In 2008 there were 142 live births to Swiss citizens and 7 births to non-Swiss citizens, and in same time span there were 116 deaths of Swiss citizens and 1 non-Swiss citizen death. Ignoring immigration and emigration, the population of Swiss citizens increased by 26 while the foreign population increased by 6. There were 8 Swiss men and 7 Swiss women who emigrated from Switzerland. At the same time, there were 29 non-Swiss men and 34 non-Swiss women who immigrated from another country to Switzerland. The total Swiss population change in 2008 (from all sources, including moves across municipal borders) was a decrease of 4 and the non-Swiss population increased by 20 people. This represents a population growth rate of 0.3%.

As of 2000, there were 2,469 people who were single and never married in the district. There were 2,489 married individuals, 340 widows or widowers and 149 individuals who are divorced.

As of 2000 the average number of residents per living room was 0.59 which is about equal to the cantonal average of 0.59 per room. In this case, a room is defined as space of a housing unit of at least 4 m^{2} (43 sq ft) as normal bedrooms, dining rooms, living rooms, kitchens and habitable cellars and attics. About 45.3% of the total households were owner occupied, or in other words did not pay rent (though they may have a mortgage or a rent-to-own agreement).

As of 2000, there were 2,107 private households in the district, and an average of 2.5 persons per household. There were 693 households that consist of only one person and 254 households with five or more people. Out of a total of 2,144 households that answered this question, 32.3% were households made up of just one person and there were 30 adults who lived with their parents. Of the rest of the households, there are 527 married couples without children, 734 married couples with children There were 84 single parents with a child or children. There were 39 households that were made up of unrelated people and 37 households that were made up of some sort of institution or another collective housing.

In 2000 there were 646 single family homes (or 47.2% of the total) out of a total of 1,370 inhabited buildings. There were 264 multi-family buildings (19.3%), along with 331 multi-purpose buildings that were mostly used for housing (24.2%) and 129 other use buildings (commercial or industrial) that also had some housing (9.4%). Of the single family homes 169 were built before 1919, while 81 were built between 1990 and 2000.

In 2000 there were 2,351 apartments in the district. The most common apartment size was 4 rooms of which there were 581. There were 121 single room apartments and 839 apartments with five or more rooms. Of these apartments, a total of 2,023 apartments (86.0% of the total) were permanently occupied, while 197 apartments (8.4%) were seasonally occupied and 131 apartments (5.6%) were empty. As of 2009, the construction rate of new housing units was 5.3 new units per 1000 residents. The vacancy rate for the district, in 2010, was 0.57%.

== Historic Population ==
The historical population is given in the following chart:

== Heritage sites of national significance ==
There are nine sites in Appenzell that are listed as Swiss heritage site of national significance. The list includes two farm houses around the village, the Kuenzes farm house at Lehnstrasse 102 and the Horersjokelis House with Barn at Lehn 76. The religious buildings on the list include the Capuchin Monastery Maria der Engel and the Parish Church of St. Mauritius. The secular buildings on the list include the Landesarchiv Appenzell Innerrhoden, the Museum Appenzell, the Rathaus (city hall) and the Castle. Finally, the entire medieval and early modern village of Appenzell was on the list. The entire village of Appenzell is also part of the Inventory of Swiss Heritage Sites.

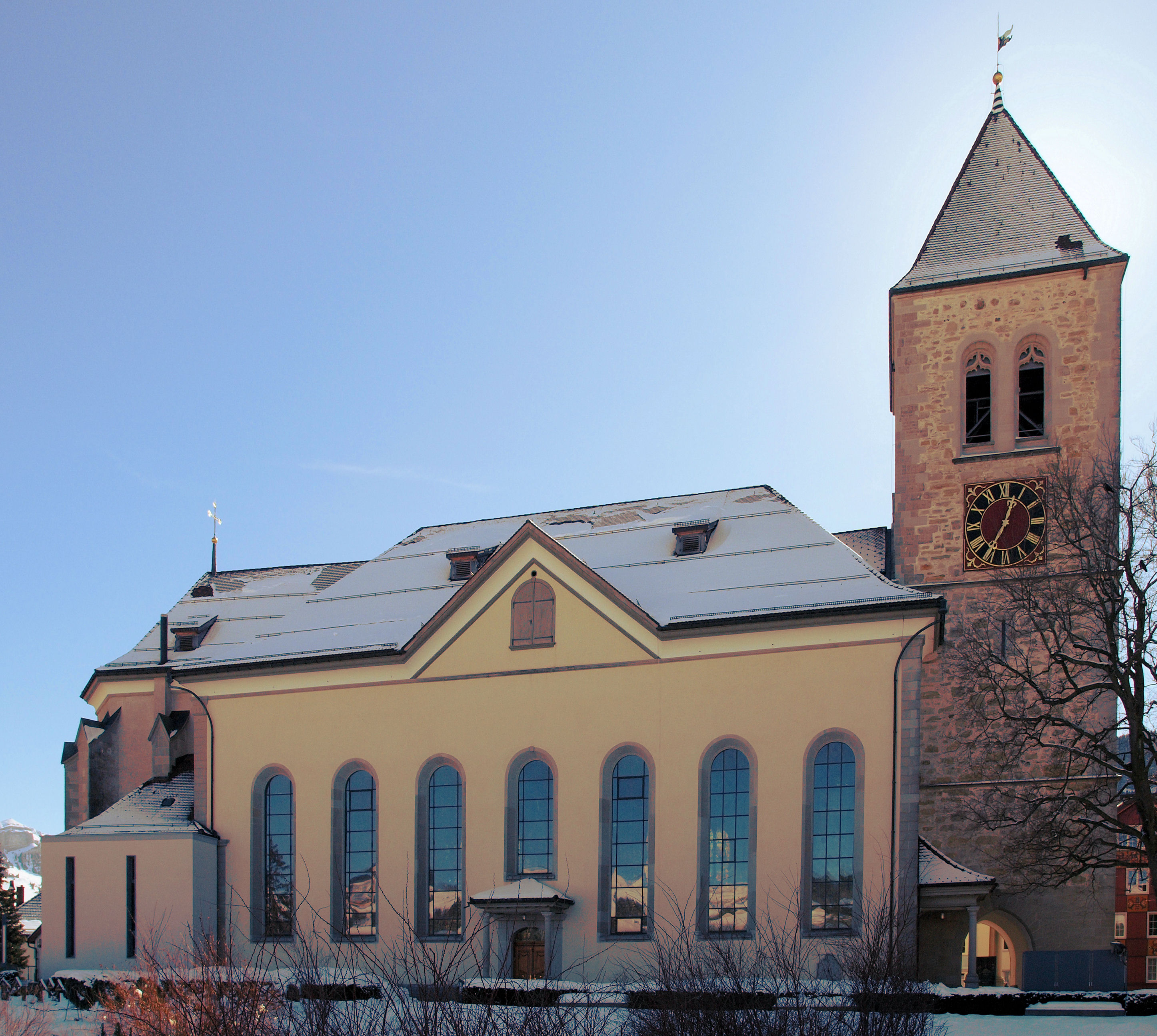
Exterior of the parish church of St. Mauritius

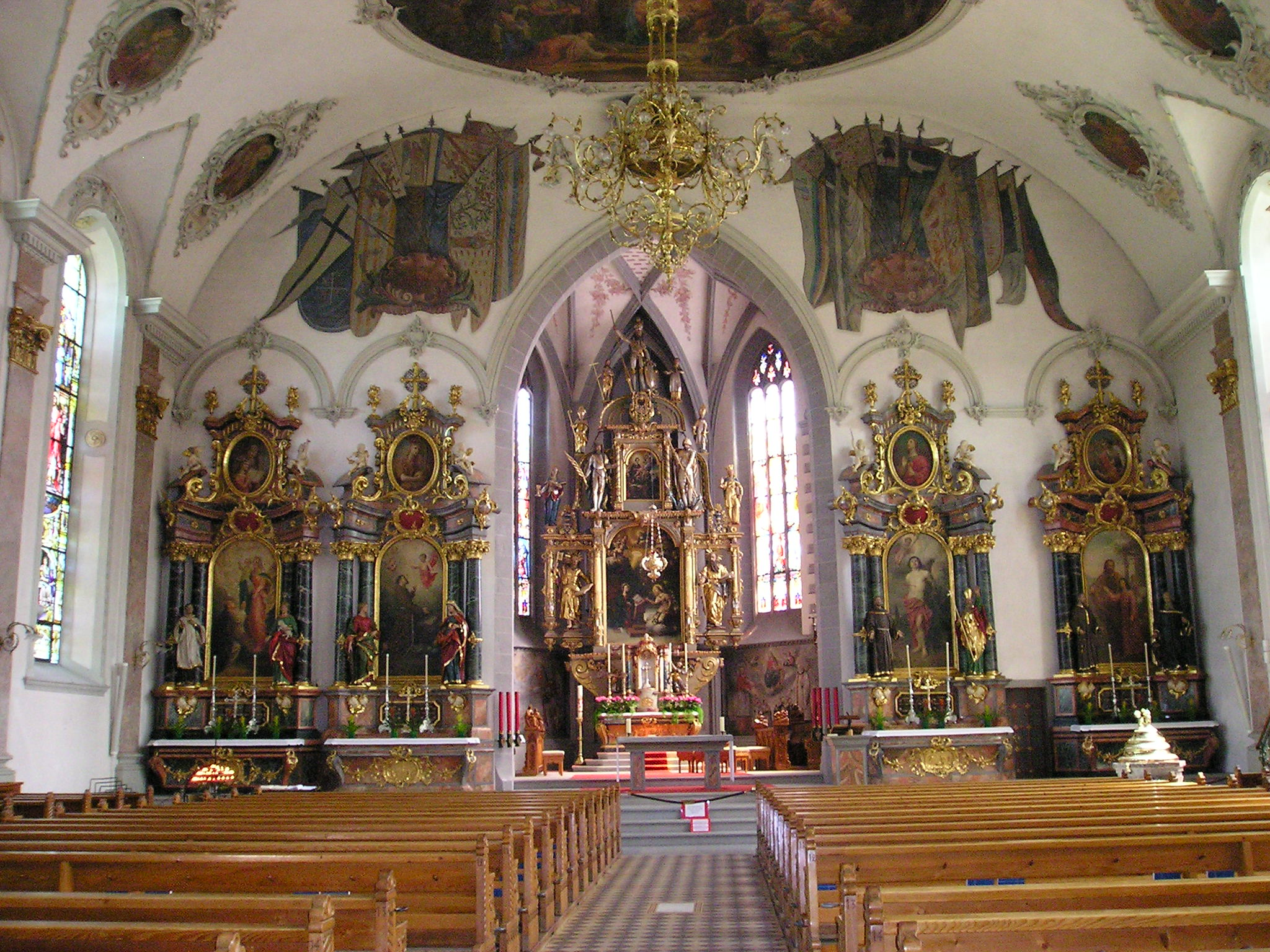
Interior of the parish church of St. Mauritius

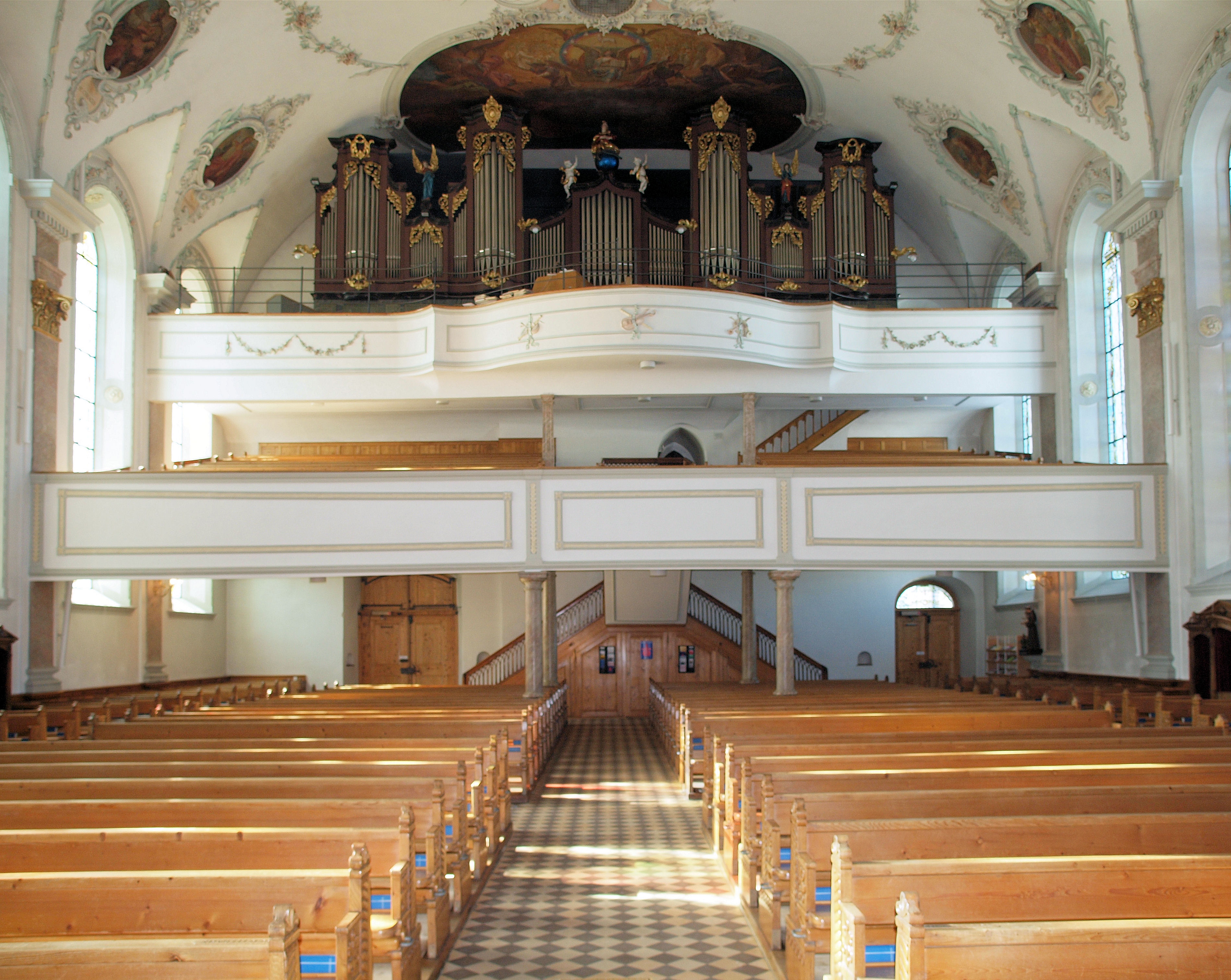
Organ of St. Mauritius

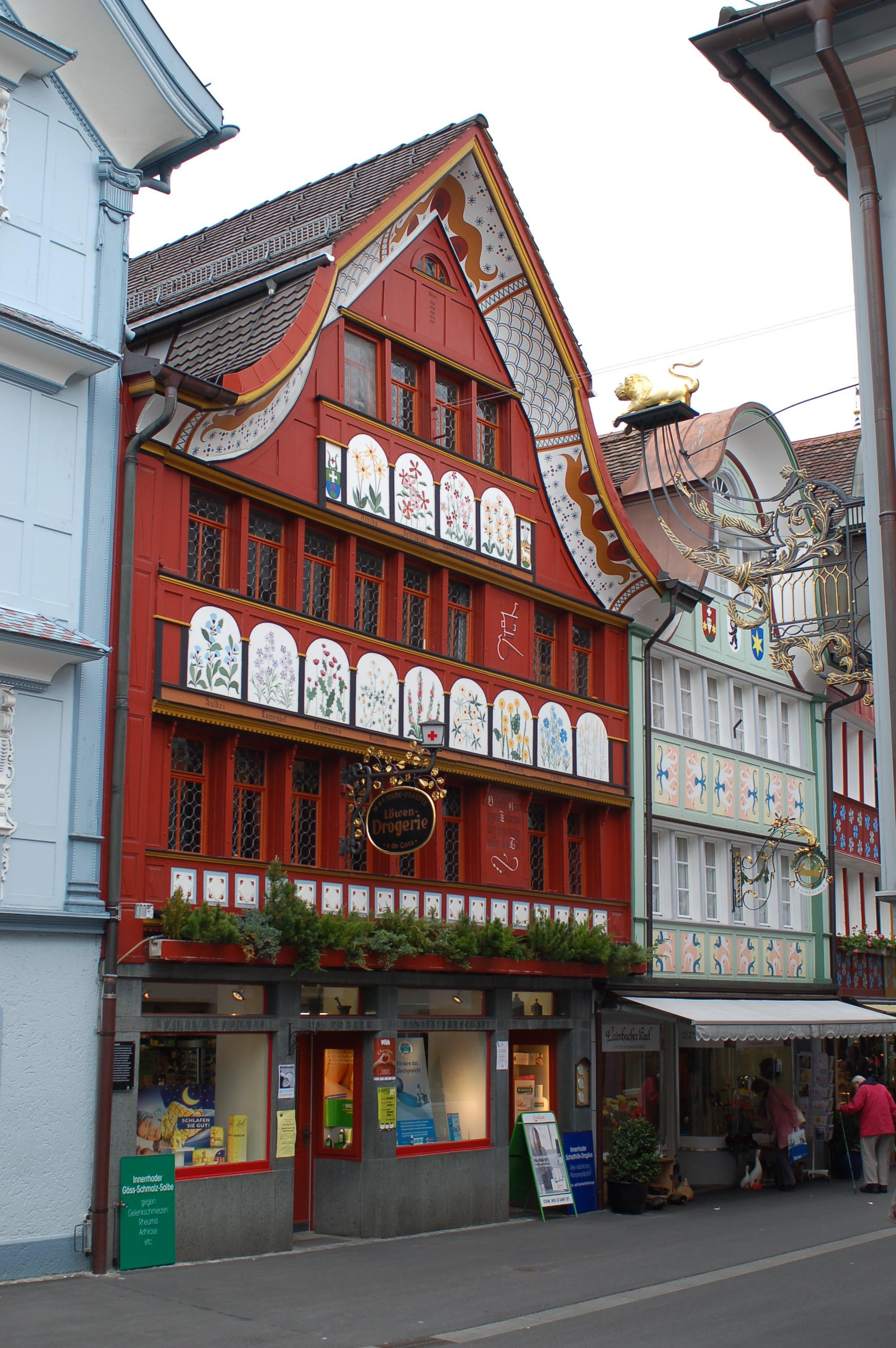
Painted house in Appenzell

== Politics ==
In the 2007 federal election the CVP received 84.46% of the vote. In the federal election, a total of 786 votes were cast, and the voter turnout was 20.6%.

== Economy ==
As of 2010, Appenzell had an unemployment rate of 2.7%. As of 2008, there were 180 people employed in the primary economic sector and about 93 businesses involved in this sector. 1,380 people were employed in the secondary sector and there were 117 businesses in this sector. 2,489 people were employed in the tertiary sector, with 344 businesses in this sector. There were 2,842 residents of the district who were employed in some capacity, of which females made up 43.5% of the workforce.

In 2008 the total number of full-time equivalent jobs was 3,425. The number of jobs in the primary sector was 127, all of which were in agriculture. The number of jobs in the secondary sector was 1,251 of which 785 or (62.7%) were in manufacturing and 407 (32.5%) were in construction. The number of jobs in the tertiary sector was 2,047. In the tertiary sector; 653 or 31.9% were in the sale or repair of motor vehicles, 78 or 3.8% were in the movement and storage of goods, 202 or 9.9% were in a hotel or restaurant, 32 or 1.6% were in the information industry, 170 or 8.3% were the insurance or financial industry, 225 or 11.0% were technical professionals or scientists, 112 or 5.5% were in education and 309 or 15.1% were in health care.

In 2000, there were 1,776 workers who commuted into the district and 989 workers who commuted away. The district is a net importer of workers, with about 1.8 workers entering the district for every one leaving. Of the working population, 7.2% used public transportation to get to work, and 44.4% used a private car.

== Transport ==
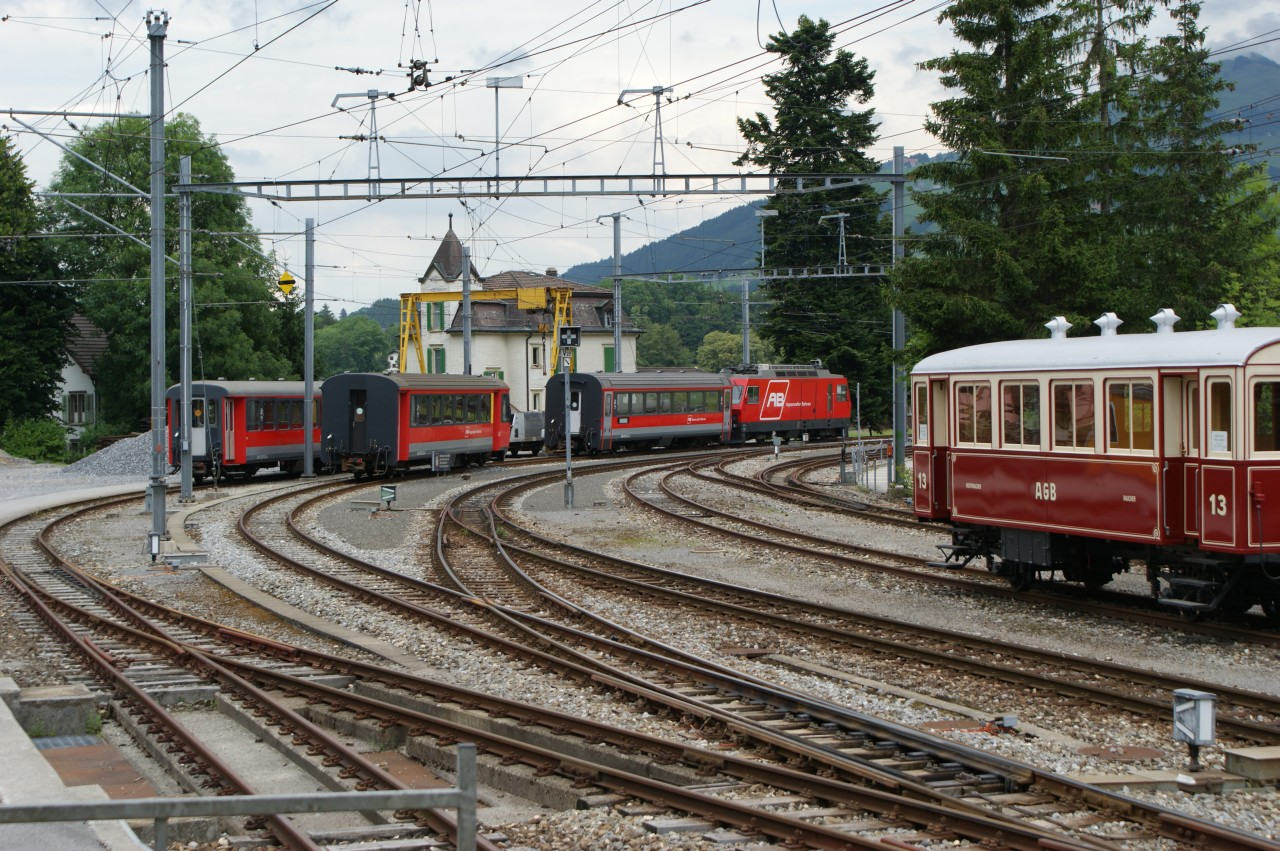
Appenzell station in 2009

The district has two railway stations, Appenzell and Sammelplatz. The former is located at the junction of the Appenzell–St. Gallen–Trogen and Gossau–Wasserauen lines. Both are served by Appenzell Railways. A third station, Hirschberg, is located in the village of Appenzell within the adjacent district of Rüte.

== Religion ==
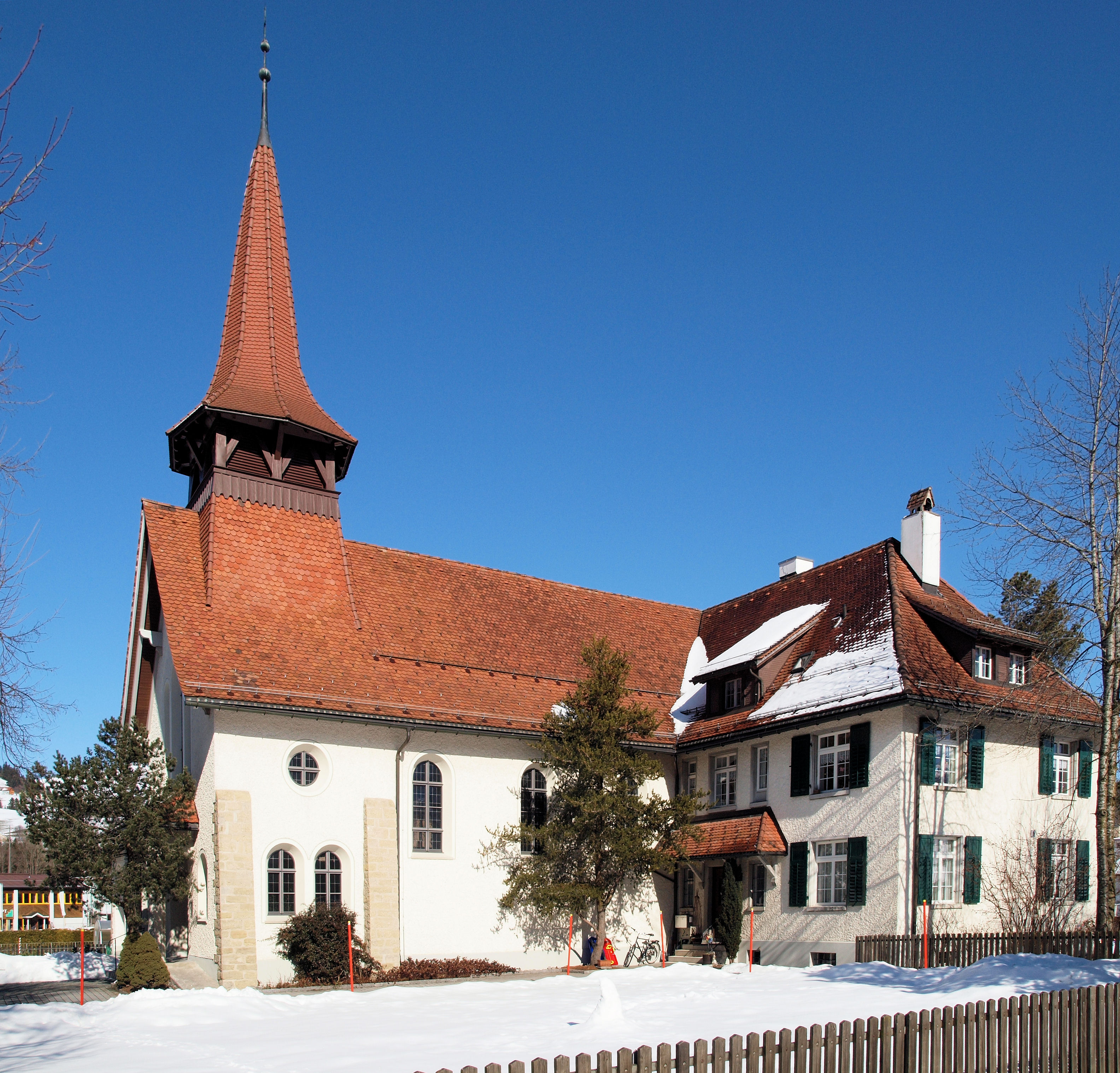
Reformed Church of Appenzell

From the 2000 census, 4,143 or 76.1% were Roman Catholic, while 494 or 9.1% belonged to the Swiss Reformed Church. Of the rest of the population, there were 181 members of an Orthodox church (or about 3.32% of the population), and there were 51 individuals (or about 0.94% of the population) who belonged to another Christian church. There were 3 individuals (or about 0.06% of the population) who were Jewish, and 379 (or about 6.96% of the population) who were Islamic. There were 8 individuals who were Buddhist, 5 individuals who were Hindu and 5 individuals who belonged to another church. 150 (or about 2.75% of the population) belonged to no church, are agnostic or atheist, and 28 individuals (or about 0.51% of the population) did not answer the question.

== Weather ==
Appenzell has an average of 158.5 days of rain or snow per year and on average receives 1,698 mm (66.9 in) of precipitation. The wettest month is June during which time Appenzell receives an average of 212 mm (8.3 in) of rain or snow. During this month there is precipitation for an average of 15.5 days. The month with the most days of precipitation is May, with an average of 15.8, but with only 163 mm (6.4 in) of rain or snow. The driest month of the year is February with an average of 99 mm (3.9 in) of precipitation over 11.7 days.

== Education ==
In Appenzell about 1,849 or (33.9%) of the population have completed non-mandatory upper secondary education, and 529 or (9.7%) have completed additional higher education (either University or a Fachhochschule). Of the 529 who completed tertiary schooling, 66.2% were Swiss men, 17.8% were Swiss women, 10.2% were non-Swiss men and 5.9% were non-Swiss women. As of 2000, there were 816 students in Appenzell who came from another district, while 81 residents attended schools outside the district.

Appenzell is home to the Innerhodische Kantonsbibliothek und Volksbibliothek library. The library has (as of 2008) 54,448 books or other media, and loaned out 77,789 items in the same year. It was open a total of 265 days with average of 31.5 hours per week during that year.
