= Ramschwag Ruins =

Castle Ruins in Switzerland

- Ruine Alt-Ramschwag
- Häggenschwil, St. Gallen
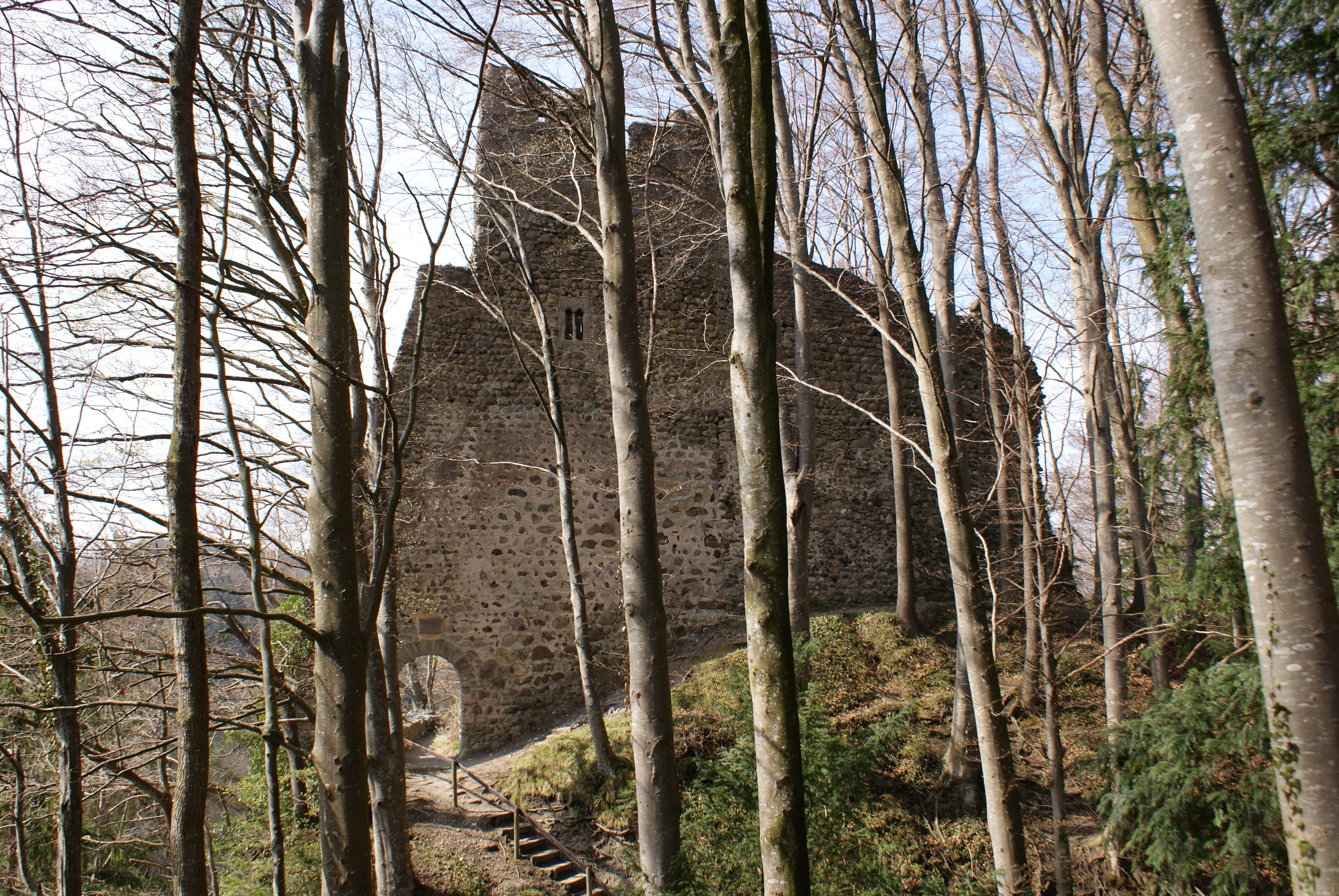
- View of the keep and the entrance

Site information
- Type: Castle
- Code: CH-SG
- Condition: Ruins

Location
- Coordinates: 47°29′24″N 9°19′20″E

Site history
- Built: around 1200
- Materials: Stones and Mortar

The Ramschwag Ruins (German: Ruine Alt-Ramschwag) are the ruins of a castle in the east of the municipality of Häggenschwil, in the Swiss canton of St. Gallen.

== Etymology ==
The ruins sit above a "Wâg" in the Sitter River. In the Middle Ages, this term referred to deep standing water, although in this case it could also be referring to a pond or waterhole on the hill east of the castle.

Castle researcher Gottlieb Felder of St. Gallen suggests three theories as to the meaning of the first syllable:

- On maps from earlier centuries, the Ramschwag Ruins were also called "Rabenstein" (German for "raven stone"). According to this interpretation, Ramschwag would consist of the words Rammis (raven) and Wâg (standing, deep water). Thus, this theory suggests that the name comes from the romantic sight of the castle surrounded by ravens.
- The «Ram» could also be named for the Middle German word "hramsa" (wild garlic), which may have previously grown in the area.
- The "Wâg" also could have referred to a man whose name contained name of the raven (Rammis), sacred to Odin, as the first or second part. In this case it could be the "Wâg" of Rambert, Bertram or Wolfram.

== Location ==
The Ramschwag Ruins are located on a plateau overlooking the Sitter River, a tributary of the Thur. Aus südöstlicher Richtung ist die Burg durch eine steile Felswand vor einem Sturmangriff geschützt. Auch die nördliche Seite ist durch ein tiefes Töbelchen sturmfrei. Die östliche Seite wird durch einen Halsgraben geschützt, der sich vom Töbelchen bis zur Felswand zieht.

== History ==
=== Construction ===
Architectural features such as the simple edge cut indicate that the castle was built shortly after 1200 AD. This is supported by the addition of the curtain walls, which were built around the same time. Other sources estimate that the castle was built between 926 and 1150 AD. In 1176, Ulrich de Rammiswag appears for the first time in a document from Konstanz. The first mention of the castle was in the year 1370, when Rudolf von Rosenberg-Zuckenriet received the castle through marriage.

=== Middle Ages and Early Modern times ===
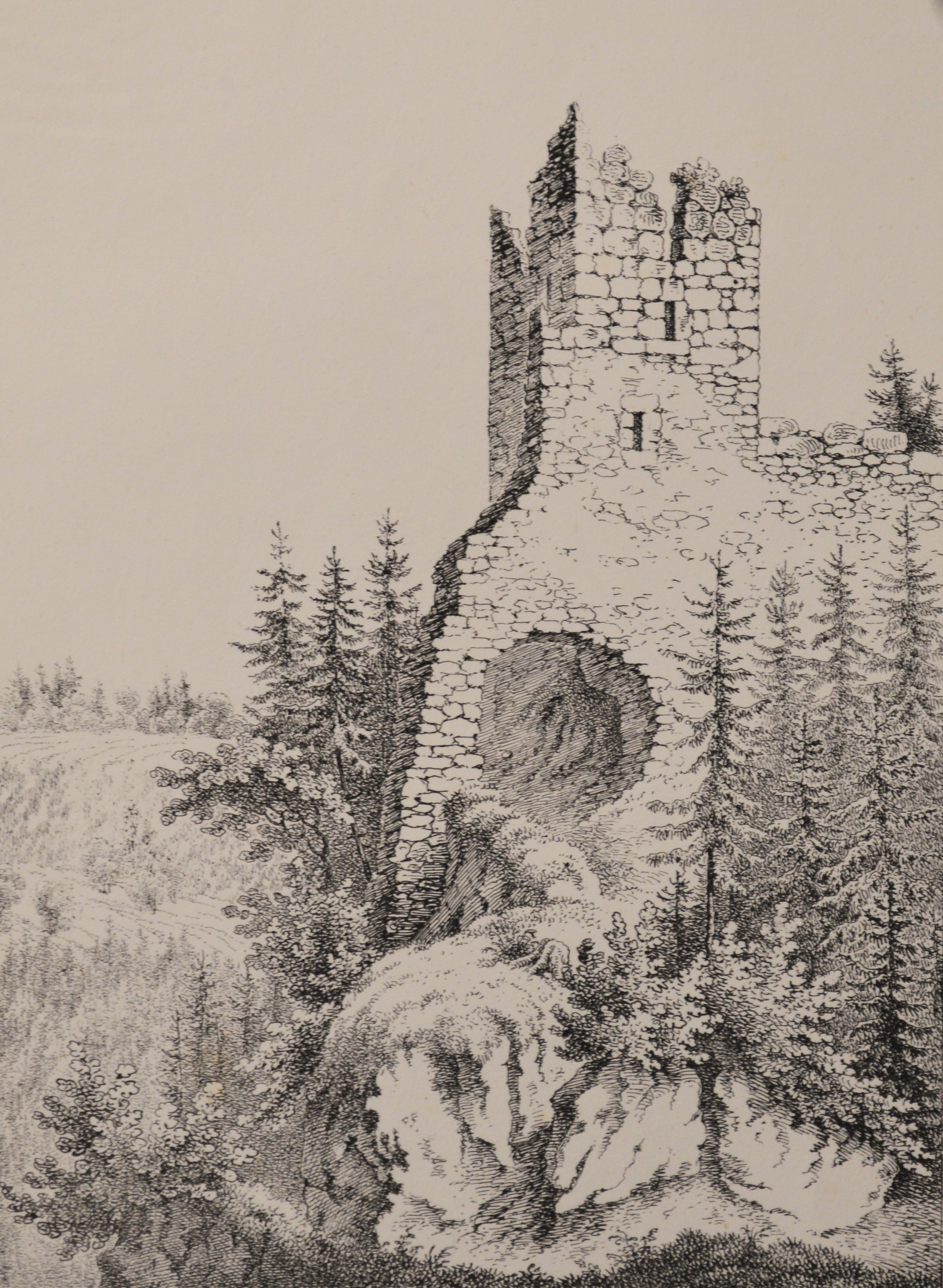
Ramschwag Ruins Lithograph, 1840

Rudolf von Rosenberg-Zuckenriet became a citizen of the city of St. Gallen in 1398. At the same time, the state of Appenzell and the City of St. Gallen were engaged in a war with the Abbey of St. Gallen and Austria. Despite his family's involvement in the war on the side of the Abbey, Rudolf von Rosenberg-Zuckenriet maintained a neutral stance. As a result, he was able to protect his properties (and thus the Ramschwag Ruins) from destruction.

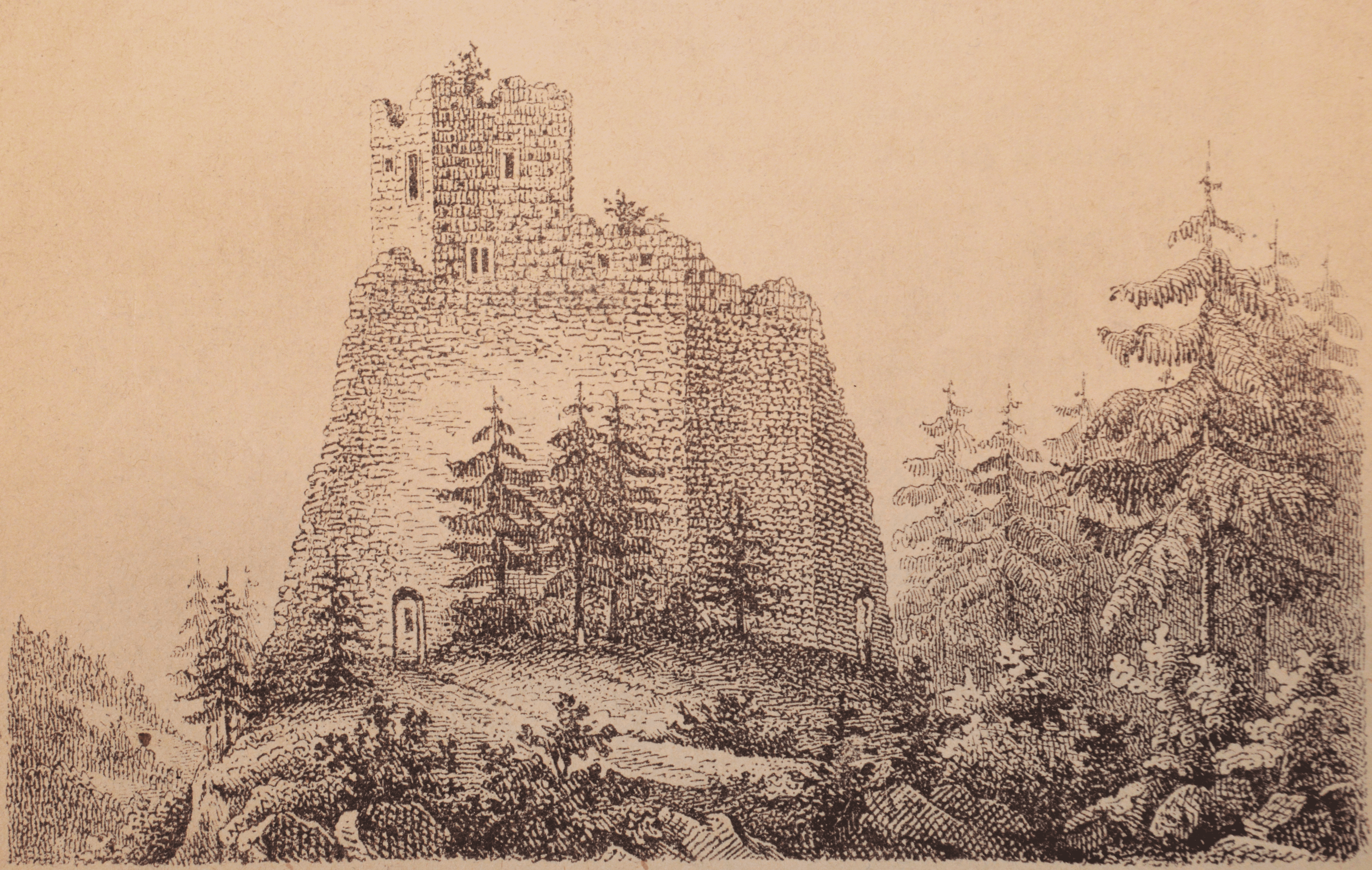
Ramschwag Ruins in 1871

In 1427, Rudolf von Rosenberg-Zuckenriet sold the castle to Ulrich and Burkard von Helmsdorf, nobles from Southern Germany who owned a significant amount of property in Thurgau. The castle remained in their ownership until 1490. Around the end of the 15th century, the castle suffered multiple landslides. Following the landslides, it was determined that the castle could only be occupied if there was danger of an invasion, and was deemed unfit for regular living. As a result of the decision, the castle ended up being sold to farmer Hans Rudolf Koller, who dismantled and sold most of the castle (such as the woodwork and clearestory).

=== Protection by the Schweizerischer Burgenverein ===
The castle fell into ruins rather quickly, and was threatened by both a crack above the archway and the owners threats to "blow the tower down into the Sitter". Soon after, it was bought by an architect by name of Müller and a builder by name of Thaler, from Häggenschwil and Waldkirch respectively. Both were members of the Schweizerischer Burgenverein, an organization devoted to the study and preservation of medieval castles in Switzerland. Upon purchasing the ruins, they commissioned work to protect the ruins. They received support from the Schweizerischen Burgenverein. While digging for stones to repair the aging walls, the foundations of multiple previously unknown buildings, both residential and commercial buildings, were discovered. During the course of the work, stone balls, arrowheads, fittings, oven tiles, shards of vessels, and animal bones were all found at the site. All in all, the conservation work lasted from 1930 to 1932.

The conservation and renovation of the castle cost 20,000 francs. Adjusted for inflation, this sums to a total of 130,000 francs (as of 2017). 10,000 francs were donated, and the federal government contributed 2,000 francs, but it is unknown where the rest of the money came from. It is plausible that the Canton of St. Gallen donated some money, as they installed a memorial plaque on the restored gate, which states that the ruins were saved from further decay with the help of the federal government, canton, historical association and private individuals and placed under federal protection.

=== Purchase by the municipality of Häggenschwil ===
On March 26, 2013, the Thaler family sold the Ruins, as well as 6000 m^{2} (64,584 ft^{2}) of forest to the municipality of Häggenschwil for 35,000 francs.

=== 2022 renovations ===
In 2022, the municipality of Häggenschwil undertook more renovations. Requiring around 60,000 kg (132277 lbs) of mortar brought from Graubünden in 210 helicopter flights, the renovations took 8 months to complete. Construction took place from March 2022 to November of the same year, costing around 600,000 francs and around 5,000 hours of labor. Since the conservation work, the Ramschwag Ruins have been declared to be the best preserved ruins between Lake Constance and Wil.

== Description ==
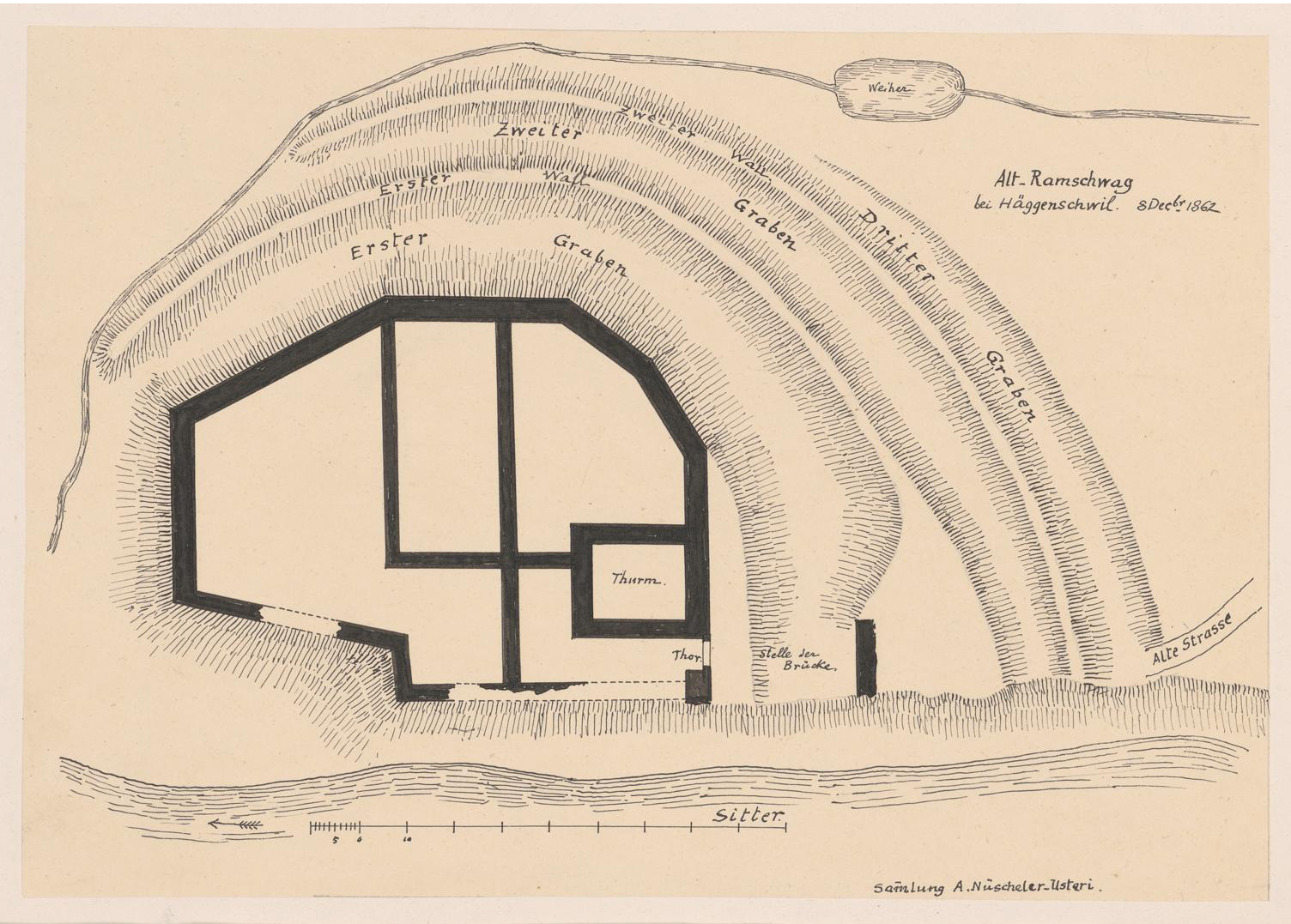
Layout of the Ramschwag ruins, 1862

The castle was originally accessible via a drawbridge, that crossed a moat to the east of the castle. There were originally two other ditches, but they are no longer visible. The walls were built with stones from the nearby Sitter River, which were plastered with mortar. The belfry was accessible via the North wall, through a tall entrance with a round stone arch that can still be seen today. It stands at a height of about 8 m (26.2 ft) above the ground. At the same height is a formerly coupled arched window with sandstone walls. Below are air vents, which were covered with horizontal sandstone slabs.

On the side of the belfry, there was once a gate that led to the courtyard. The castle can still be entered through the gate, but the drawbridge has not been preserved. Remains of the former abutments can still be found on the opposite side of the moat.

The courtyard was protected on all sides by a curtain wall, part of which has since fallen into the Sitter. Towards the east, the castle is protected by a shield wall around 10 meters high. Today, the foundation walls of residential and commercial buildings can still be found.

== Literature ==
- Gottlieb Felder: Die Burgen der Kantone St. Gallen und Appenzell. Erster Teil (Neujahrsblatt des historischen Vereins des Kantons St. Gallen.) Verlag der Fehr'schen Buchhandlung, St. Gallen 1907, S. 28.
- Eduard Brachetto: Geheimnisvolle Zeugen des Mittelalters. Die 70 grössten und schönsten Burgruinen der Schweiz. Books on Demand, Norderstedt 2007, ISBN 978-3-8370-0010-8, S. 14–16.
- Fritz Hauswirth: Burgen und Schlösser der Schweiz. Band 2, St. Gallen, Appenzell, Fürstentum Liechtenstein. Gaissberg Verlag, Kreuzlingen 1965, S. 65–66
- Hugo Schneider: Burgen der Schweiz. Band 6, Kantone St. Gallen, Thurgau, Appenzell. Silva Verlag, Zürich 1983, S. 21–22.
- Jerôme H. Farnum: 20 Ausflüge zu romantischen Burgruinen in der Schweiz. Ein Hallwag Führer. Hallwag, Bern 1976, ISBN 3-444-10174-0, S. 138–141.
- Hermann Meili (Hrsg.): Burgen, Schlösser und Burgherrengeschlechter der Ostschweiz. Verlag Fritz Meili, Trogen 1970, S. 38–39.
- Ernst Götzinger: Hie hebt an das Buechlin der Herren von Ramswage. Druck von Emil Zollikofer, St. Gallen 1872.
