= Appenzell Meistersrüte =

Village in Appenzell, Switzerland

Coordinates: 47.345°N 9.430°E

Appenzell Meistersrüte is a village in the district of Appenzell in the canton of Appenzell Innerrhoden, Switzerland. Its population is about 800.
