= Sammelplatz railway station =

Train station in Switzerland

Sammelplatz
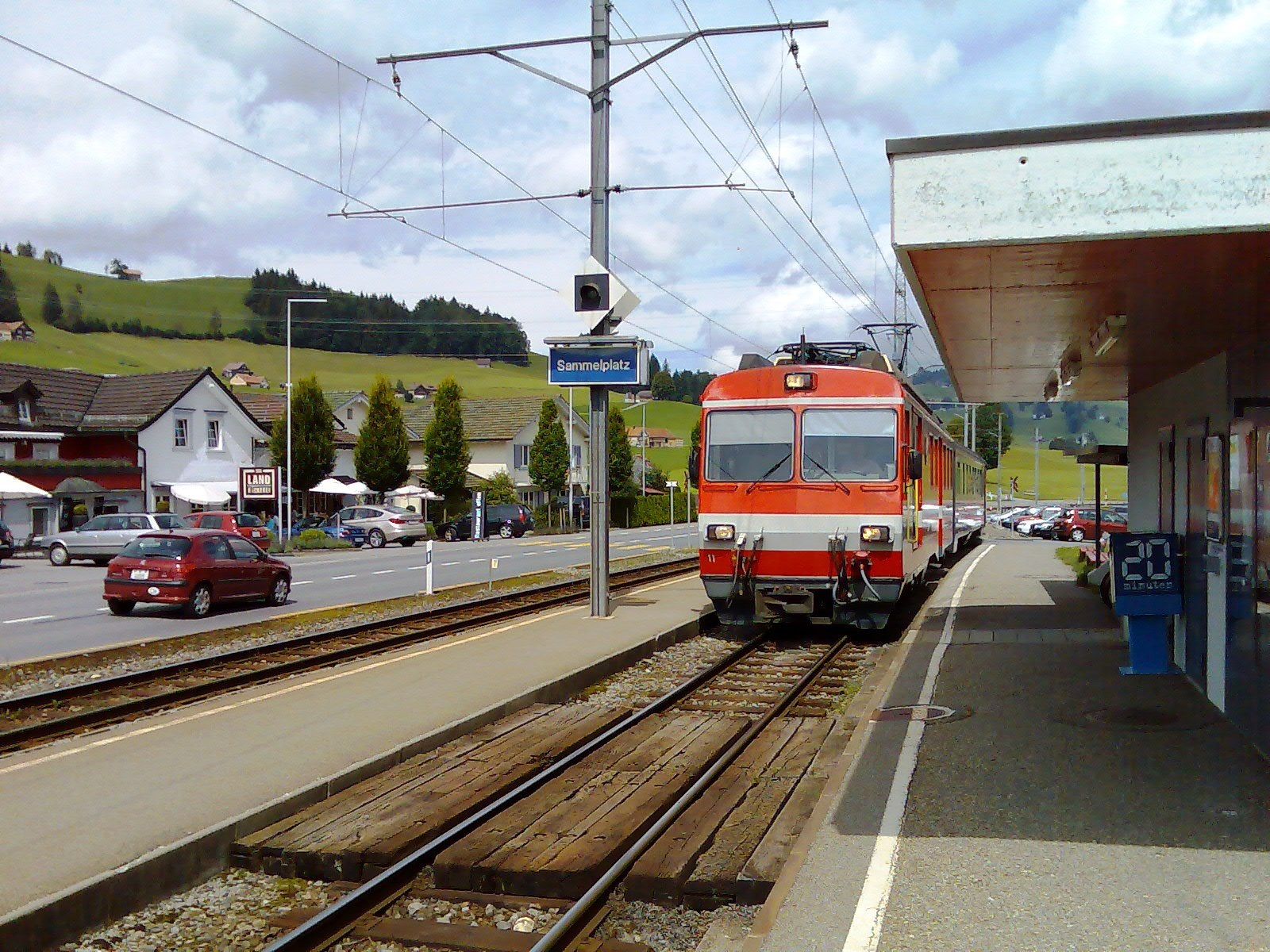
- A train arrives at the station in 2011

General information
- Location: Appenzell, Appenzell Innerrhoden; Switzerland
- Coordinates: 47°20′54″N 9°25′57″E
- Elevation: 928 m (3,045 ft)
- Owner: Appenzell Railways
- Line: Appenzell–St. Gallen–Trogen line
- Distance: 16.1 km (10.0 mi) from St. Gallen
- Platforms: 1 island platform; 1 side platform
- Tracks: 2
- Train operators: Appenzell Railways

Other information
- Fare zone: 245 and 247 (Tarifverbund Ostwind)

Services
Preceding station	St. Gallen S-Bahn	Following station
Hirschberg towards Appenzell	S20	Gais towards Trogen
Hirschberg towards Appenzell	S21	Gais towards Trogen
Location
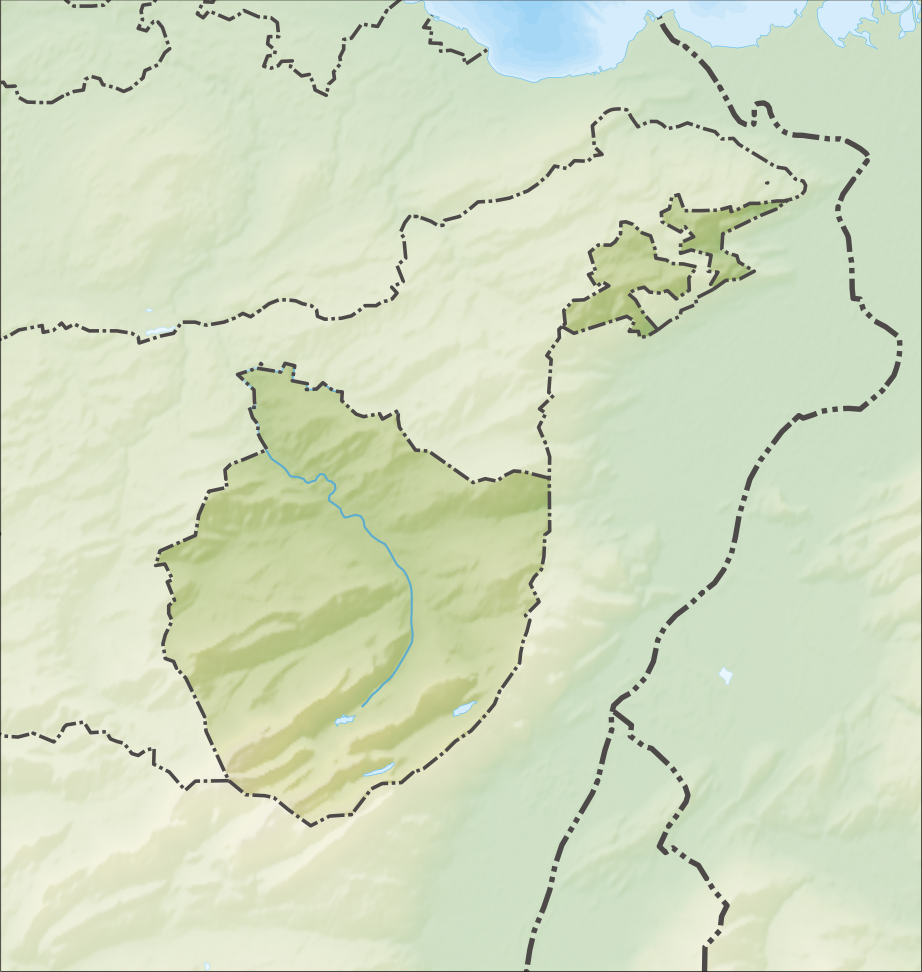
- Location within Switzerland Location within Canton of Appenzell Innerrhoden

Sammelplatz railway station (German: Bahnhof Sammelplatz) is a railway station in the district of Appenzell, in the Swiss canton of Appenzell Innerrhoden. It is located on the 1,000 mm (3 ft 3 3/8 in) metre gauge Appenzell–St. Gallen–Trogen line of Appenzell Railways.

== Services ==
As of the December 2020 timetable change, the following services stop at Sammelplatz:

- St. Gallen S-Bahn:
  - S20: rush-hour service between Appenzell and Trogen, via St. Gallen (only calls at Niederteufen, Teufen AR and Bühler between Gais and St. Gallen).
  - S21: half-hourly service between Appenzell and Trogen, via St. Gallen.
