= Hirschberg railway station =

Train station in Switzerland

Hirschberg
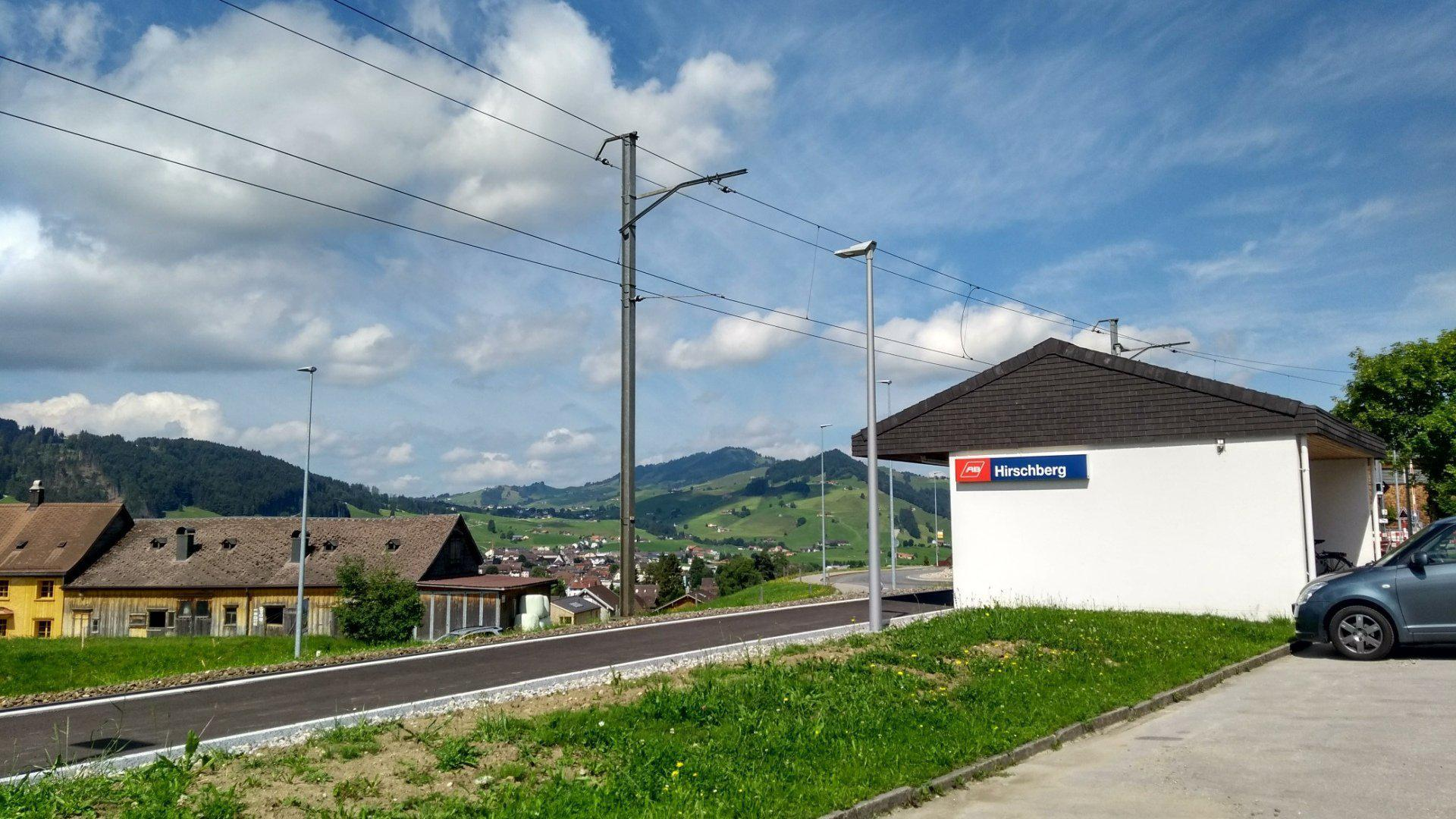
- The station platform in 2018

General information
- Location: Rüte, Appenzell Innerrhoden; Switzerland
- Coordinates: 47°19′53″N 9°25′22″E
- Elevation: 820 m (2,690 ft)
- Owner: Appenzell Railways
- Line: Appenzell–St. Gallen–Trogen line
- Distance: 18.4 km (11.4 mi) from St. Gallen
- Platforms: 1 side platform
- Tracks: 1
- Train operators: Appenzell Railways
- Connections
- Bus: PostAuto bus route 191

Other information
- Fare zone: 247 (Tarifverbund Ostwind)

Services
Preceding station	St. Gallen S-Bahn	Following station
Appenzell Terminus	S20	Sammelplatz towards Trogen
Appenzell Terminus	S21	Sammelplatz towards Trogen
Location
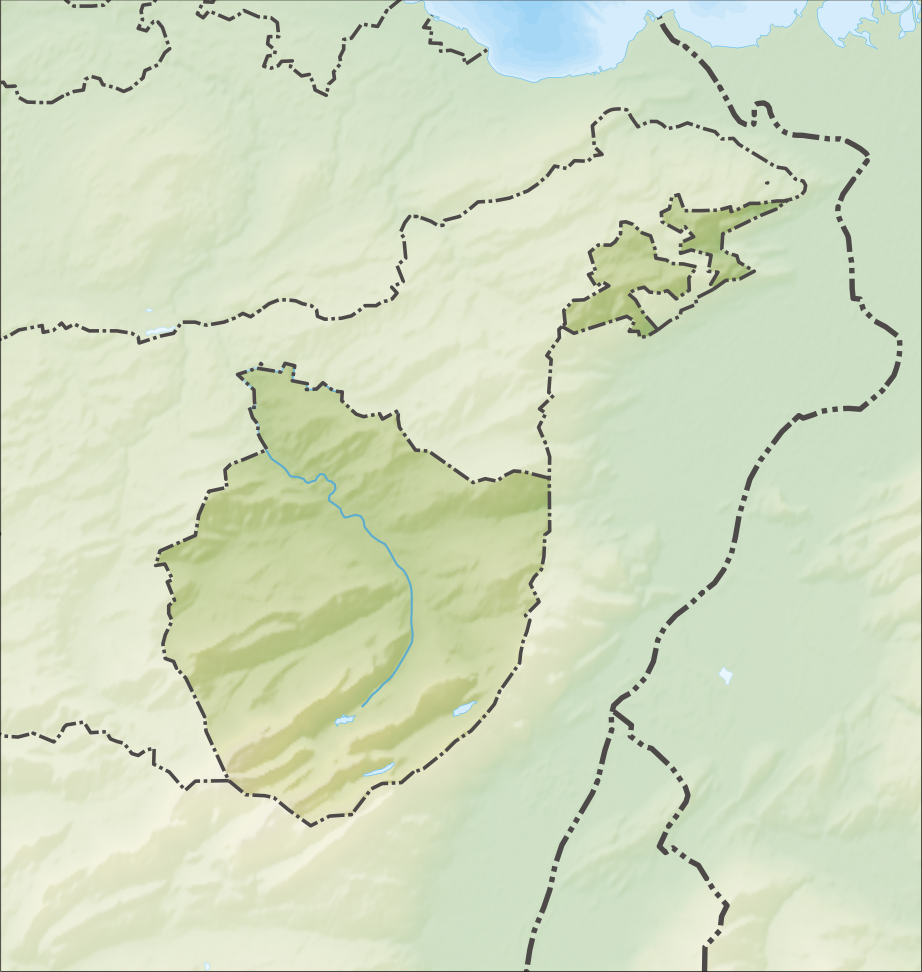
- Location within Switzerland Location within Canton of Appenzell Innerrhoden

Hirschberg railway station (German: Bahnhof Hirschberg) is a railway station in the district of Rüte, in the Swiss canton of Appenzell Innerrhoden. It is located on the 1,000 mm (3 ft 3 3/8 in) metre gauge Appenzell–St. Gallen–Trogen line of Appenzell Railways, and is served as a request stop by local trains only.

== Services ==
As of the December 2020 timetable change, the following services stop at Hirschberg:

- St. Gallen S-Bahn:
  - S20: rush-hour service between Appenzell and Trogen, via St. Gallen (only calls at Niederteufen, Teufen AR and Bühler between Gais and St. Gallen).
  - S21: half-hourly service between Appenzell and Trogen, via St. Gallen.
