= Sitter (river) =

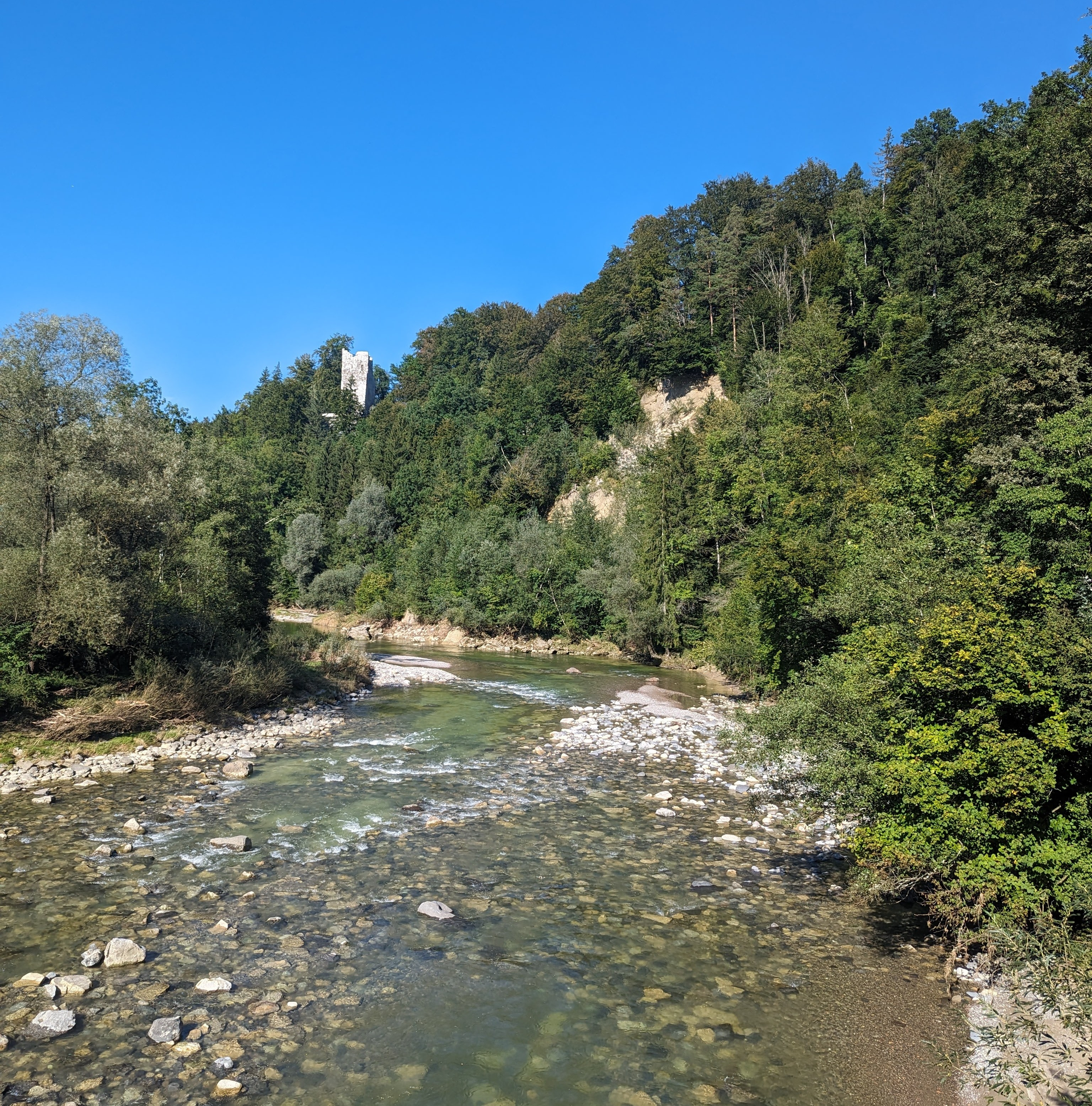
- The Sitter near the Ramschwag Ruins (visible in the background)

Location
- Country: Switzerland

Physical characteristics
- Source: Confluence of Wissbach, Schwendibach and Brühlbach in Weissbad
  - coordinates: 47°18′44″N 9°26′03″E
  - elevation: 810 m (2,660 ft)
- Mouth: Thur
  - location: Bischofszell
  - coordinates: 47°29′52″N 9°13′55″W
  - elevation: 460 m (1,510 ft)
- Length: 48.91 km (30.39 mi)
- Basin size: 340 km^{2} (130 sq mi)
- Discharge
  - average: 11.89 m^{3}/s (420 cu ft/s)

Basin features
- Progression: Thur→ Rhine→ North Sea

The Sitter is the largest tributary of the Thur river, and flows through the Swiss cantons of Appenzell Innerrhoden, Appenzell Ausserrhoden, St. Gallen and Thurgau. It starts on the north side of Alpstein massif in Appenzell Innerrhoden, and joins River Thur near the town of Bischofszell in Thurgau.

== Name ==
The name Sitter comes from Sidrona, and likely goes back to illyrian influences in the early settlement of the Appenzell area.

== Geography ==
=== Source Streams ===
The Sitter begins in the canton of Appenzell Innerrhoden, in Weissbad at a height of 810 metres (2,660 ft) above sea level, at the confluence of Weissbach and Schwendibach.

==== Schwendibach ====
The Schwendibach is the 6.1 kilometres (3.8 mi) long, southern and right tributary of the Sitter.

It has a catchment area of 34.94 square kilometres (13.49 mi^{2}) and an average discharge of 1.79 m^{3}/s (63 cu ft/s). Although it is shorter than the Weissbach, it has a larger catchment basin and a stronger average discharge (MQ), making it the hydrological main branch of the Sitter river system. It originates in the eastern part of the Alpstein mountain range.

==== Weissbach ====
The Weissbach, also known as Wissbach, is the 9.8 km long, southwest and left tributary of the Sitter.

It has a catchment area of 26.52 square kilometres (10.24 mi^{2}), an average discharge of 1.35 m^{3}/s (48 cu ft/s) and begins north of the Böhlhütte at a height of 1,004.7 metres (3,296 ft) above sea level, at the convergence of the Seckbach and Fallbach.

=== Subsequent Course ===
The Sitter has a length of 49 kilometres (30 mi) from its origin at the confluence of its tributaries to its confluence with the Thur in Bischofszell. Over its course, the Sitter changes from a small mountain stream to a river with an average flow rate of almost 12 m^{3}/s (420 cu ft/s).

=== Catchment Area ===
The 339.94 square kilometres (131.25 mi^{2}) large catchment area of the sitter stretches from the Appenzell Alps to the Swiss Plateau und is drained through it via the Thur and the Rhine to the North Sea.

The catchment area is made up of 29,7 % forested area, 55,8 % agricultural land, 9,3 % settled area, and 5,2 % unproductive land.

Catchment Area Distribution

The mean altitude of the catchment area is 941.7m above sea level, with a minimum altitude of 441m above sea level and a maximum altitude of 2,427m above sea level.

=== Tributaries ===
The main tributaries of the Sitter are the Rotbach and the Urnäsch.

Source streams and tributaries of the Sitter above 5 kilometres (3.1 mi) in length

== Hydrology ==
The mouth of the Sitter in the Thur has a modeled mean discharge rate of (MQ) 11.89 m^{3}/s (420 cu ft/s). Its flow regime type is nivo-pluvial préalpin and its flow variability is 20.

Modeled average monthly discharge (MQ) of the Sitter in m³/s

== Economy and Transport ==
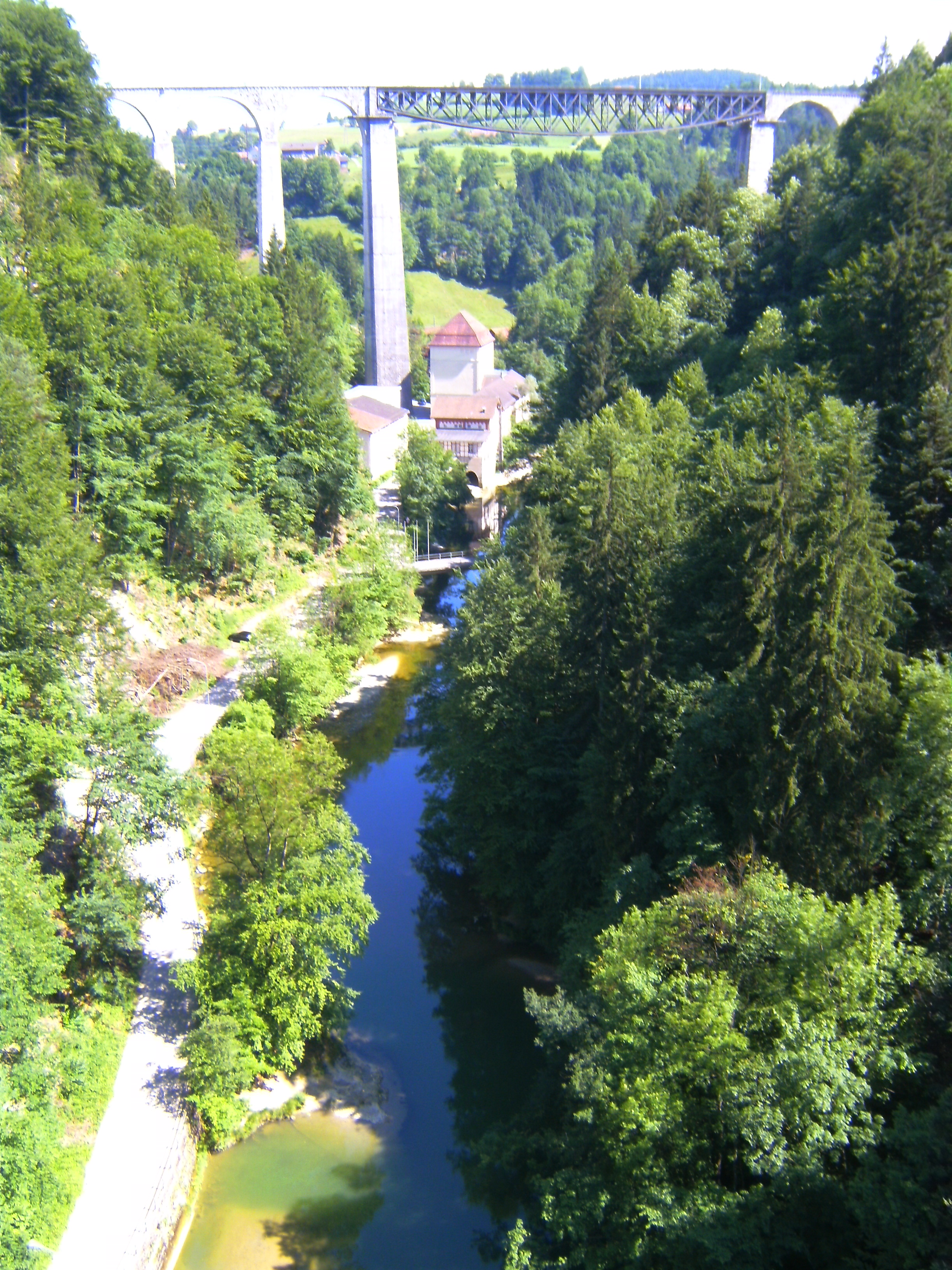
The Sitter in St. Gallen with Kraftwerk Kubel und the Südostbahn Viaduct

=== Use ===
Both the main river and its tributaries are used for a variety of purposes in certain parts, while other sections are almost untouched by humans.

The Sitter and its valley are used

- as an important local recreation area
- for hydropower
- for fishing
- for the extraction of drinking and utility water
- as effluent for wastewater treatment
- for gravel extraction
- as a natural habitat for many plants and animals

=== Hydropower ===
Energy was originally produced at 11 hydroelectric plants along the sitter. Only 7 remain in use to this day. The largest share of electricity production (87%) goes to the Kubelkraftwerk of St. Gallisch-Appenzellischen Kraftwerke AG (SAK). The Gübsensee on the outskirts of St. Gallen serves as a water reservoir in this setup.

=== Shipping and Ferries ===
Since 1975, the annual Mammoth Raft Race (usually on Mother's Day) has been held on a course on the Sitter and Thur rivers, featuring homemade rafts in front of thousands of spectators. Alongside speed, the originality of the rafts is also a key factor.

Die Gertau–Degenau Ferry, which crosses the Sitter, connects the municipalities of Hauptwil-Gottshaus and Zihlschlacht-Sitterdorf.

=== Bridges ===
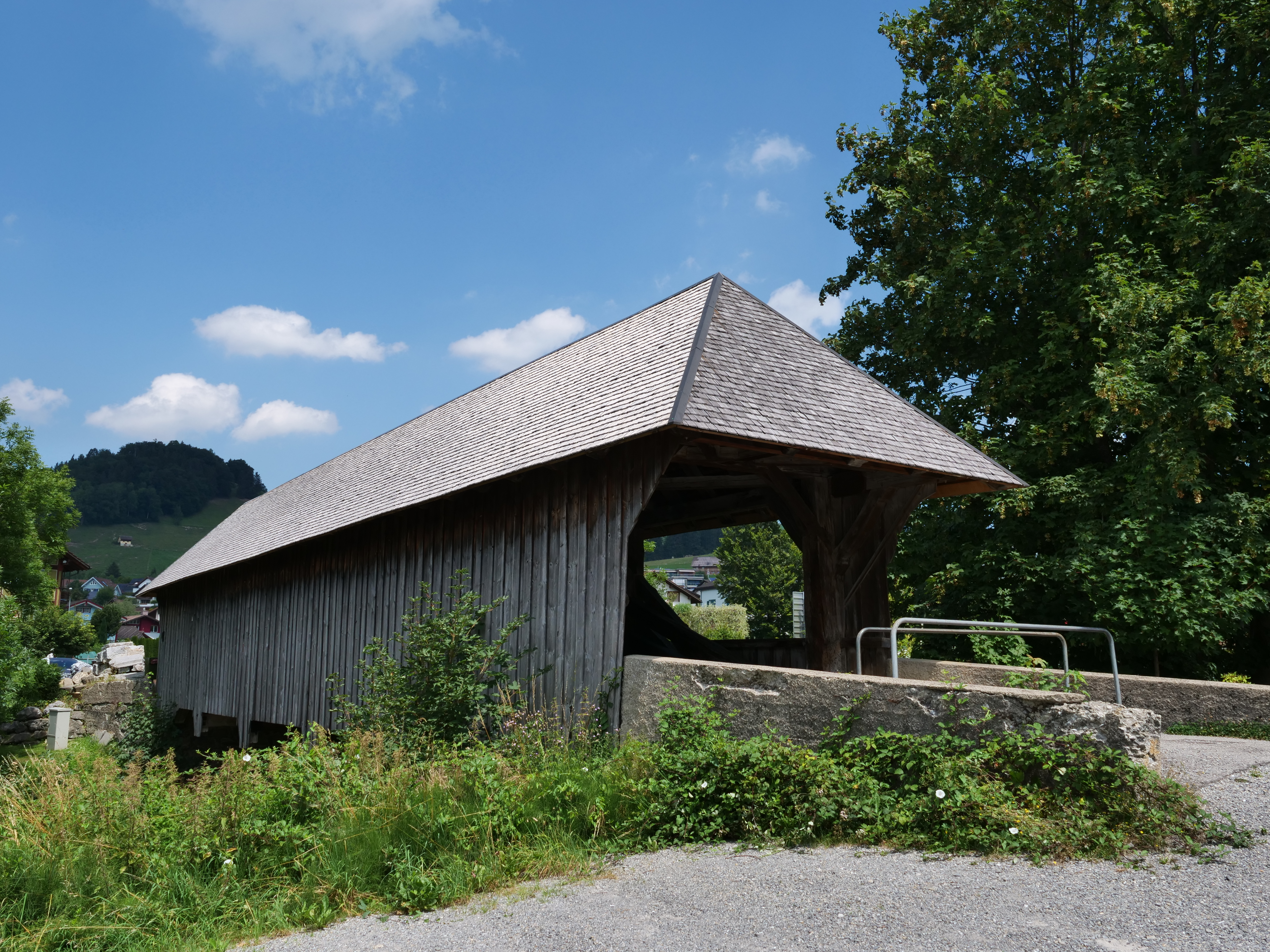
The Mettlenbrücke from 1751, a covered bridge over the Sitter.

Along its course, the Sitter is crossed by 50 bridges. Most bridges of the St. Gallen bridge path cross the Sitter.

In 1949, Swiss Post issued a five-cent postal stamp depicting the Sitter bridges near St. Gallen.

== See also ==
- List of rivers of Switzerland
