= Höchhand =

Mountain in Switzerland

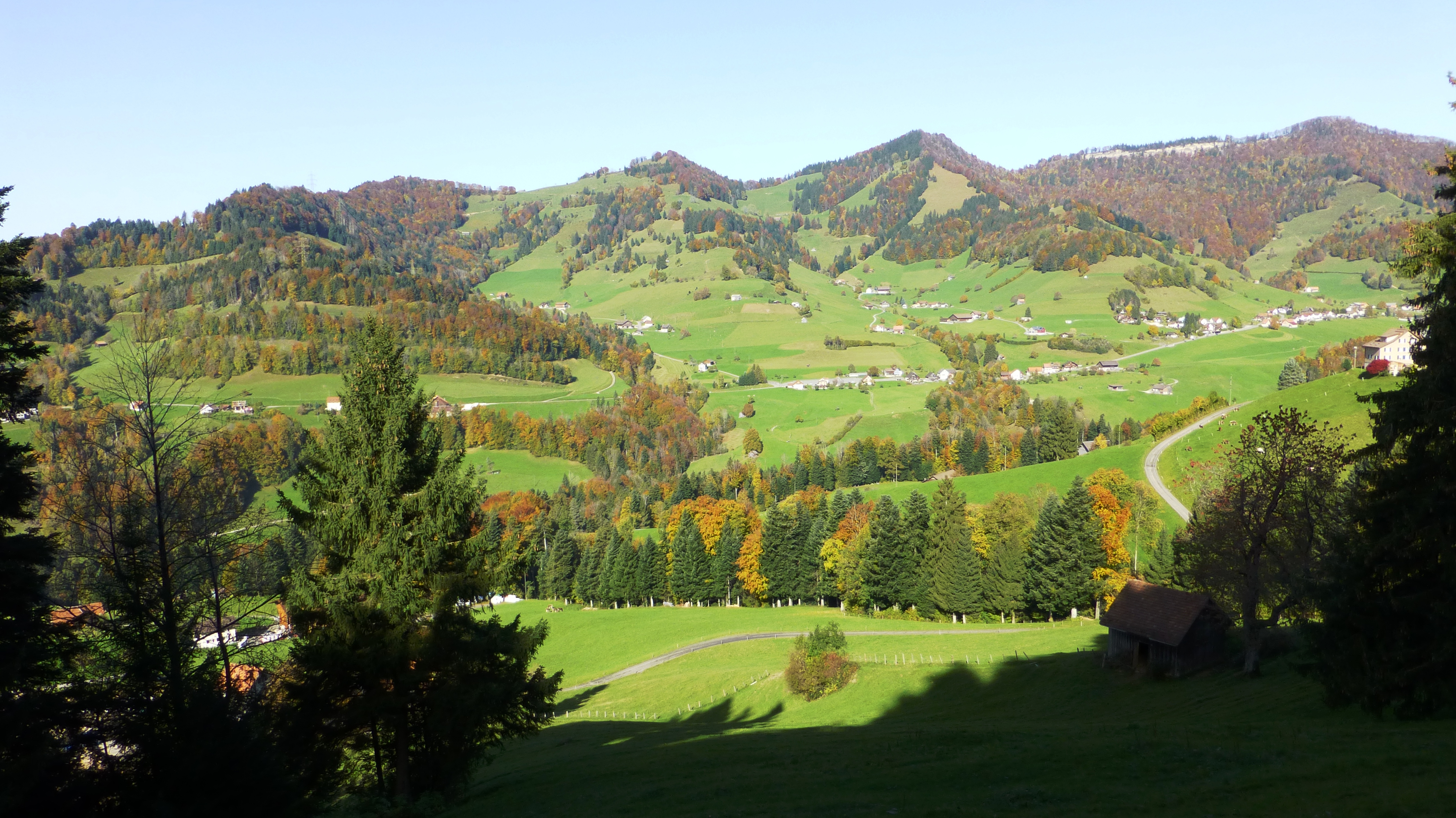
- Farner (1,158 m [3,799 ft]), Schwarzenberg (1,286 m [4,219 ft]) und Höchhand

Highest point
- Elevation: 1,314 m (4,311 ft)
- Prominence: 311 m (1,020 ft)
- Parent peak: Tweralpspitz
- Coordinates: 47°17′52″N 8°58′41″E

Geography
- Location within Switzerland Location within Canton of St. Gallen
- Location: St. Gallen, Switzerland
- Parent range: Appenzell Alps

The Höchhand (1,314 m [4,311 ft]) is a mountain of the Appenzell Alps, located north of Goldingen in the canton of St. Gallen.

== See also ==
- List of mountains of the canton of St. Gallen
