= Hörnli =

Mountain in Switzerland

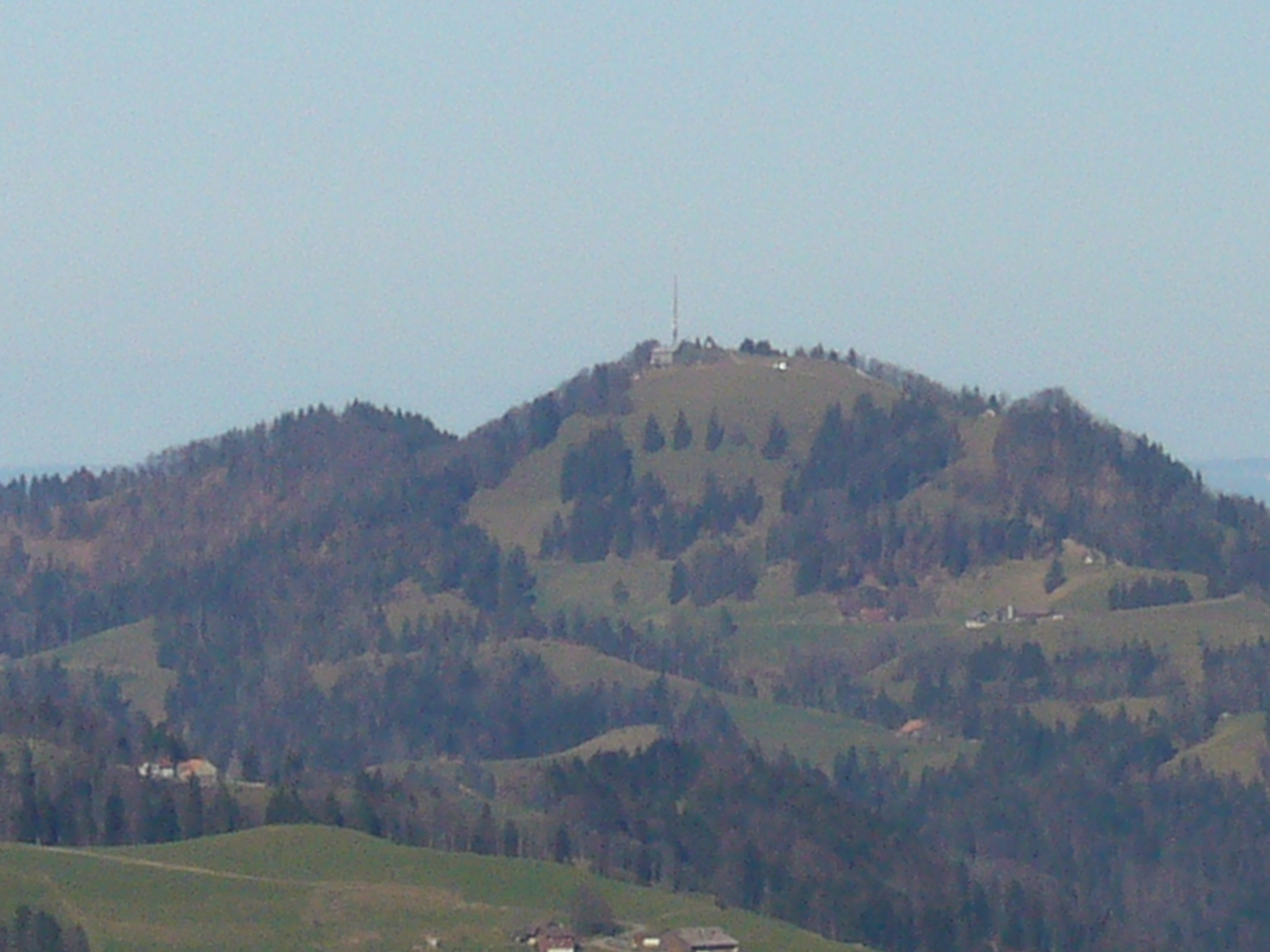
- Hörnli as seen from Bachtel (March 2007)

Highest point
- Elevation: 1,133 m (3,717 ft)
- Coordinates: 47°22′16″N 8°56′16″E

Geography
- Location within Switzerland Location within Canton of Zurich
- Location: Canton of Zurich
- Country: Switzerland
- Parent range: Swiss Prealps (Appenzell Alps)

Hörnli mountain is located on the territory of the community of Fischenthal, in the Zürcher Oberland, in the eastern part of canton of Zurich, in Switzerland. It is 1,133 meters (3,717 ft) high.

North of the Hörnli, at an altitude 992 meters (3,255 ft), the Dreiländerstein (lit. 'stone of the three lands') marks the meeting of the boundaries of the three cantons of Zurich, St.Gallen and Thurgau.

Already in the Middle Ages, the so-called Schwabenweg, led over the Hörnli, as a part of the Way of St. James. Since 2008, it is an integrated stretch of the Kreuzlingen branch on the Via Jacobi, registered on the official Swiss national trekking path nr. 4, signalled as leg Fischingen–Rapperswil on Wanderland Schweiz.

== Climate ==
Climate data for Hörnli, elevation 1,133 m (3,717 ft), (1991–2020)
Month	Jan	Feb	Mar	Apr	May	Jun	Jul	Aug	Sep	Oct	Nov	Dec	Year
Mean daily maximum °C (°F)	1.9 (35.4)	2.0 (35.6)	5.7 (42.3)	10.0 (50.0)	14.3 (57.7)	17.8 (64.0)	19.7 (67.5)	19.4 (66.9)	14.8 (58.6)	10.9 (51.6)	5.9 (42.6)	2.9 (37.2)	10.4 (50.7)
Daily mean °C (°F)	−0.6 (30.9)	−0.6 (30.9)	2.4 (36.3)	6.1 (43.0)	10.1 (50.2)	13.6 (56.5)	15.5 (59.9)	15.5 (59.9)	11.4 (52.5)	7.8 (46.0)	3.2 (37.8)	0.3 (32.5)	7.1 (44.8)
Mean daily minimum °C (°F)	−3.1 (26.4)	−3.1 (26.4)	−0.4 (31.3)	2.7 (36.9)	6.6 (43.9)	10.1 (50.2)	12.0 (53.6)	12.2 (54.0)	8.6 (47.5)	5.2 (41.4)	0.7 (33.3)	−2.2 (28.0)	4.1 (39.4)
Average relative humidity (%)	77	76	75	72	75	75	74	76	81	81	80	78	77
Mean monthly sunshine hours	82.8	91.8	131.1	158.2	169.9	188.1	210.4	200.0	153.2	116.7	79.2	69.7	1,651.1
Percentage possible sunshine	34	35	39	42	40	43	48	50	44	39	32	31	41
Source 1: NOAA
Source 2: MeteoSwiss

== See also ==
- Way of St. James (route descriptions)
- Way of St. James
- St. James
- Swiss Plateau
