= Bachtel =

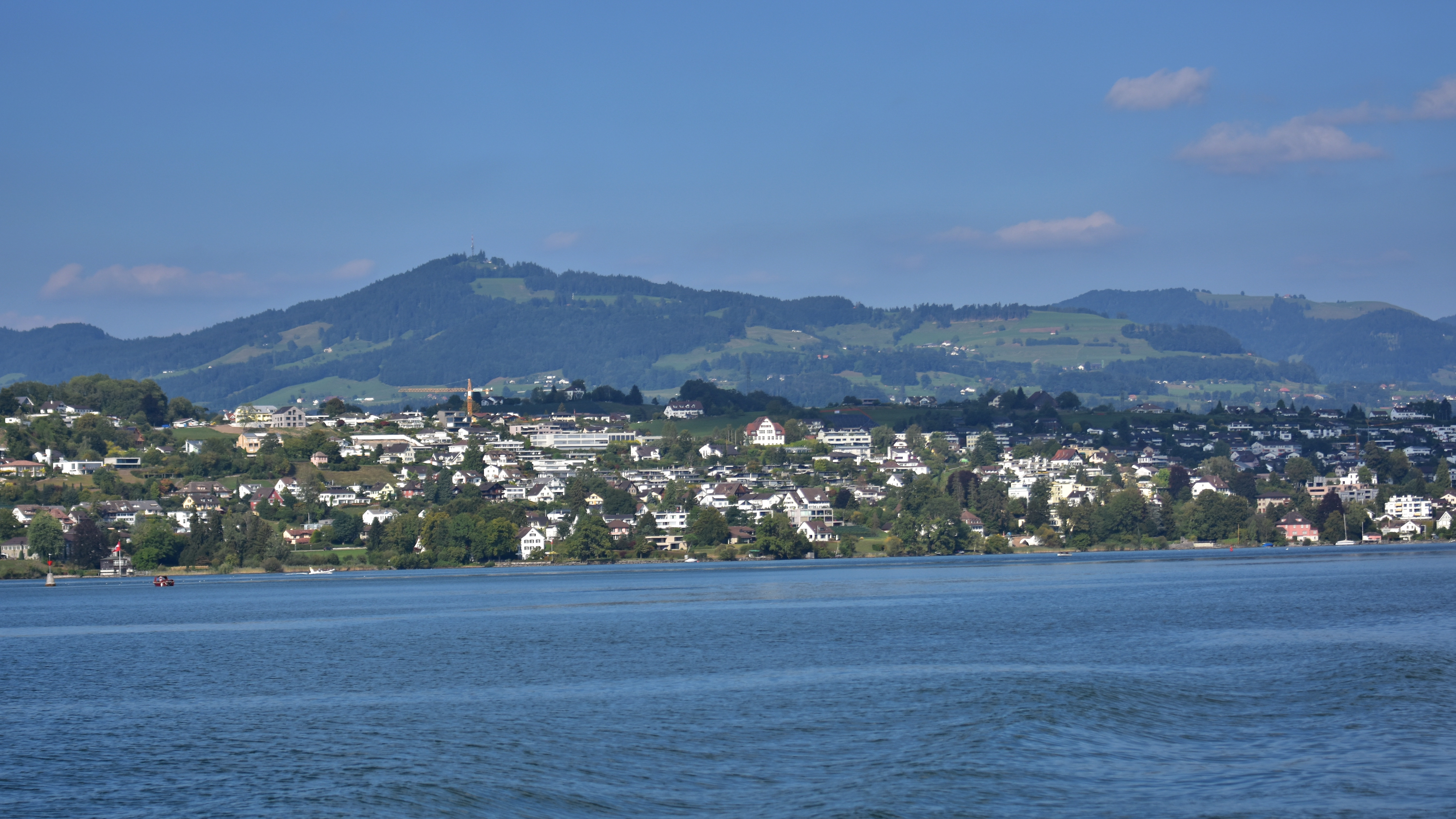
- Bachtel mountain (background) and Kempraten as seen from Zürichsee-Schifffahrtsgesellschaft (ZSG) ship MS Helvetia on Lake Zurich

Highest point
- Elevation: 1,115 m (3,658 ft)
- Prominence: 358 m (1,175 ft)
- Parent peak: Tweralpspitz
- Coordinates: 47°17′41″N 8°53′11″E

Geography
- Location within Switzerland Location within Canton of Zurich
- Location: Canton of Zurich
- Country: Switzerland
- Parent range: Appenzell Alps (Eastern Swiss Prealps)

Climbing
- Easiest route: Road

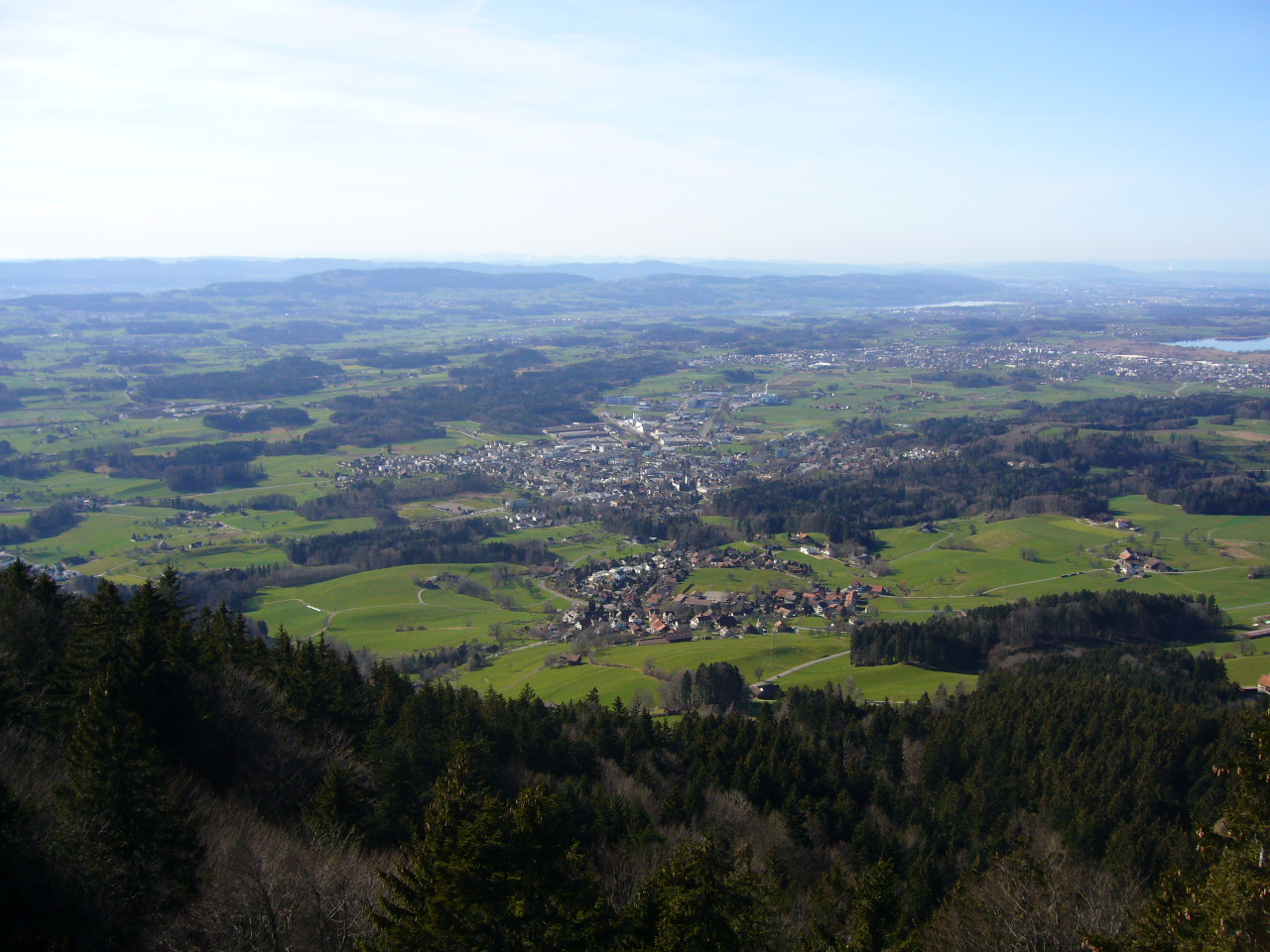
View from the summit

Bachtel is a mountain of the Zurich Oberland, located between Hinwil and Wald in the canton of Zurich, Switzerland. It lies approximately halfway between the Schnebelhorn (the highest point in the canton) and Lake Zurich.

On the summit is the Bachtel Tower, a 60 metres (200 ft) tall radio tower, a playground and a restaurant (Bachtel-Kulm Besen-Beiz).

The Bachtel range (also Allmann or Allmen, Bachtel-Allmen-Kette) separates the Töss and Glatt basins. Extending to the north of Bachtel proper, towards Bauma, it includes Auenberg (1,050 m [3,440 ft]), Allmen (1,079 m [3,540 ft]) and Stüssel (1,051 m [3,448 ft]).

== See also ==
- Prealps
- Swiss Alps
