= Appenzell Alps =

Swiss mountain range

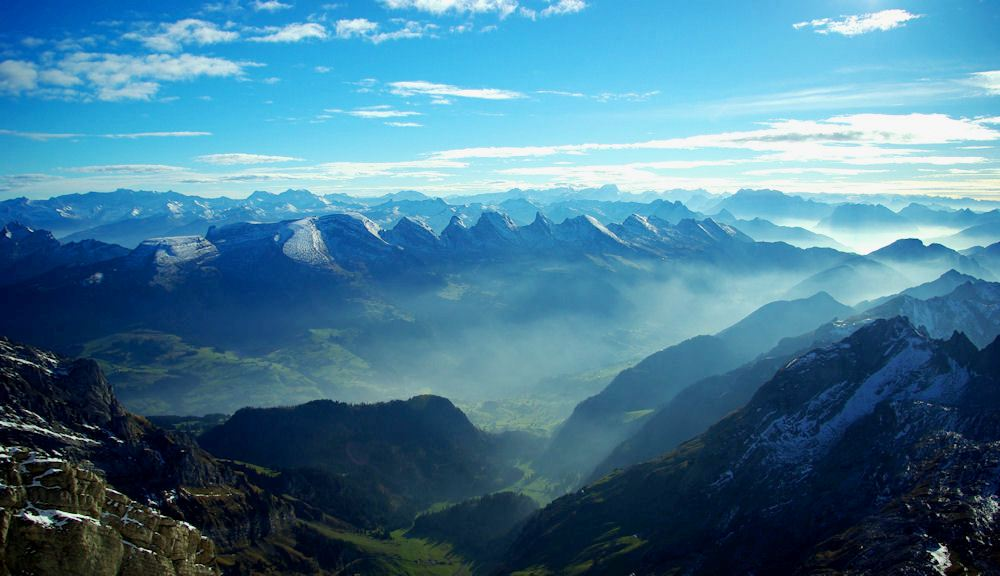
- Churfirsten group, with the Schibestoll, Zuestoll, Brisi, Frümsel, and Selun (left to right)

Highest point
- Peak: Säntis
- Elevation: 2,502 m (8,209 ft)
- Coordinates: 46°38′28″N 8°25′6″E

Naming
- Native name: Appenzeller Alpen (German)

Geography
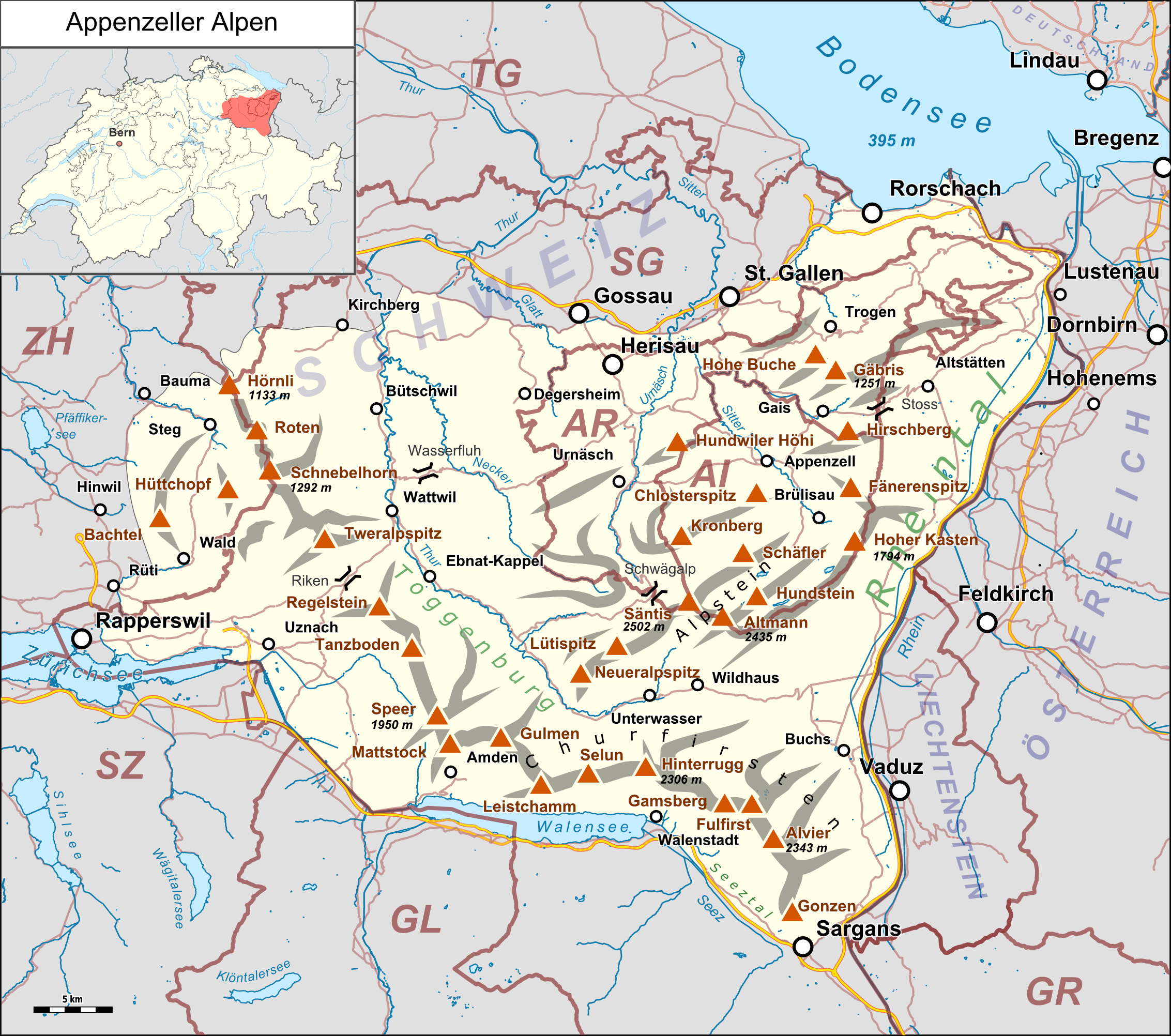
- Country: Switzerland
- Cantons: Appenzell Ausserrhoden, Appenzell Innerrhoden, St. Gallen and Zurich
- Parent range: Western Alps
- Borders on: Glarus Alps, Rätikon and Schwyz Alps
- Topo map: Swiss Federal Office of Topography swisstopo

The Appenzell Alps (German: Appenzeller Alpen) are a mountain range in Switzerland on the northern edge of the Alps. They extend into the cantons of Appenzell Ausserrhoden, Appenzell Innerrhoden and St. Gallen (with lower summits occurring also in the cantons of Thurgau and Zurich) (Note: In the northwest and north of the Appenzell Alps, there are several proposed border demarcations between them and the Appenzell and Toggenburg regions and the Swiss Prealps: The border drawn in the Swiss Alpine Club guidebook runs along a line from Uznach over the Ricken Pass to Wattwil. From there, it ascends the Toggenburg region to Nesslau and over the Chräzeren Pass near Schwägalp to Urnäsch. From there, the border runs directly east to Appenzell and further north past the Fähnern summit into the Alpine Rhine Valley. However, peaks still exist north of this border, reaching an altitude of 1,528 metres (5,013 ft) at the Hochalp. Depending on the perspective, one or more of these northern peaks may therefore still be considered part of the Appenzell Alps.) and are bordered by the Schwyz Alps to the southwest, the Glarus Alps to the south, and the Rätikon to the south-east, and cover an area of about 1,800 km^{2} (690 sq mi). The highest summit is the Säntis, with an elevation of 2,502 m (8,209 ft).

== Sub-ranges ==
The range is split up into six sub-ranges:

- Alpstein
  - Central group, highest summit: Altmann, 2,435 m / 7,989 ft
  - Northern group, highest summit: Säntis, 2,502 m / 8,209 ft
  - Southern group, highest summit: Roslen- or Saxerfirst, 2,151 m / 7,057 ft
- Alvier group, highest summit: Gamsberg, 2,385 m / 7,825 ft
- Churfirsten, highest summit: Hinterrugg, 2,306 m / 7,566 ft
- Speer - Mattstock, highest summit: Speer, 1,950 m / 6,400 ft

== Geography ==
=== Principal summits ===
The principal summits of the Appenzell Alps are:

- Säntis, 2,502 m / 8,209 ft
- Girenspitz, 2,448 m / 8,031 ft
- Altmann, 2,436 m / 7,992 ft
- Gamsberg, 2,385 m / 7,825 ft
- Fulfirst, 2,384 m / 7,822 ft
- Wildhuser Schafberg, 2,373 m / 7,785 ft
- Wisswand, 2,346 m / 7,697 ft
- Alvier, 2,343 m / 7,687 ft
- Gauschla, 2,310 m / 7,580 ft
- Hinterrugg, 2,306 m / 7,566 ft
- Brisi, 2,279 m / 7,477 ft
- Frümsel, 2,267 m / 7,438 ft
- Zuestoll, 2,235 m / 7,333 ft
- Margelchopf, 2,163 m / 7,096 ft
- Silberplatten, 2,158 m / 7,080 ft
- Hundstein, 2,157 m / 7,077 ft
- Schibestoll, 2,136 m / 7,008 ft
- Leistchamm, 2,101 m / 6,893 ft
- Gamser Rugg, 2,076 m / 6,811 ft
- Kreuzberge, 2,065 m / 6,775 ft
- Marwees, 2,056 m / 6,745 ft
- Lütispitz, 1,987 m / 6,519 ft
- Speer, 1,950 m / 6,400 ft
- Mattstock, 1,936 m / 6,352 ft
- Schäfler, 1,924 m / 6,312 ft
- Federispitz, 1,865 m / 6,119 ft
- Gonzen, 1,830 m / 6,000 ft
- Hoher Kasten, 1,795 m / 5,889 ft
- Gulmen, 1,789 m / 5,869 ft
- Stockberg, 1,781 m / 5,843 ft
- Kronberg, 1,663 m / 5,456 ft
- Ebenalp, 1,640 m / 5,380 ft
- Hochalp, 1,521 m / 4,990 ft

=== Other interesting summits ===
- Kamor, 1,751 m / 5,745 ft
- Tanzboden, 1,443 m / 4,734 ft
- Tweralpspitz, 1,332 m / 4,370 ft
- Chrüzegg, 1,314 m / 4,311 ft
- Höchhand, 1,314 m / 4,311 ft
- Hundwiler Höhi, 1,306 m / 4,285 ft
- Gäbris, 1,247 m / 4,091 ft
- Schnebelhorn, 1,291 m / 4,236 ft
- Hörnli, 1,133 m / 3,717 ft
- Köbelisberg, 1,131 m / 3,711 ft
- Bachtel, 1,115 m / 3,658 ft

== Gallery ==
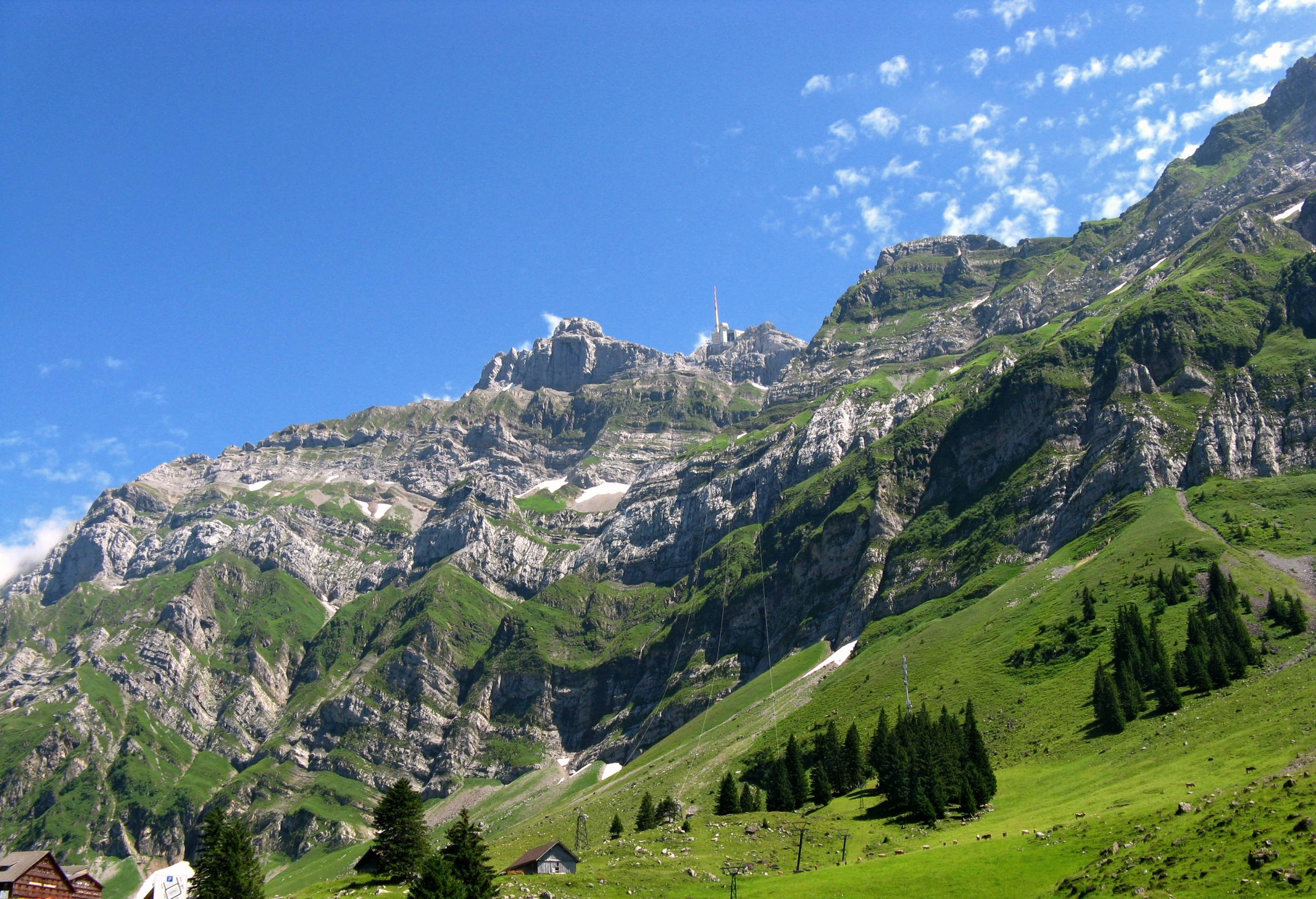
Säntis from Schwägalp

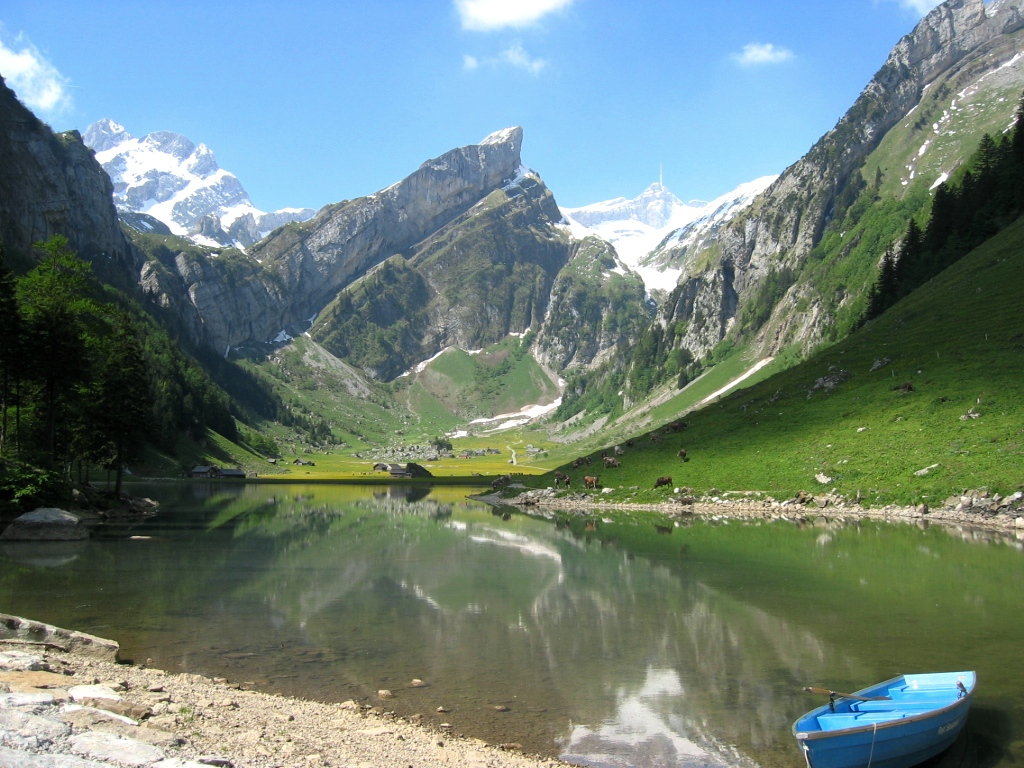
Seealpsee

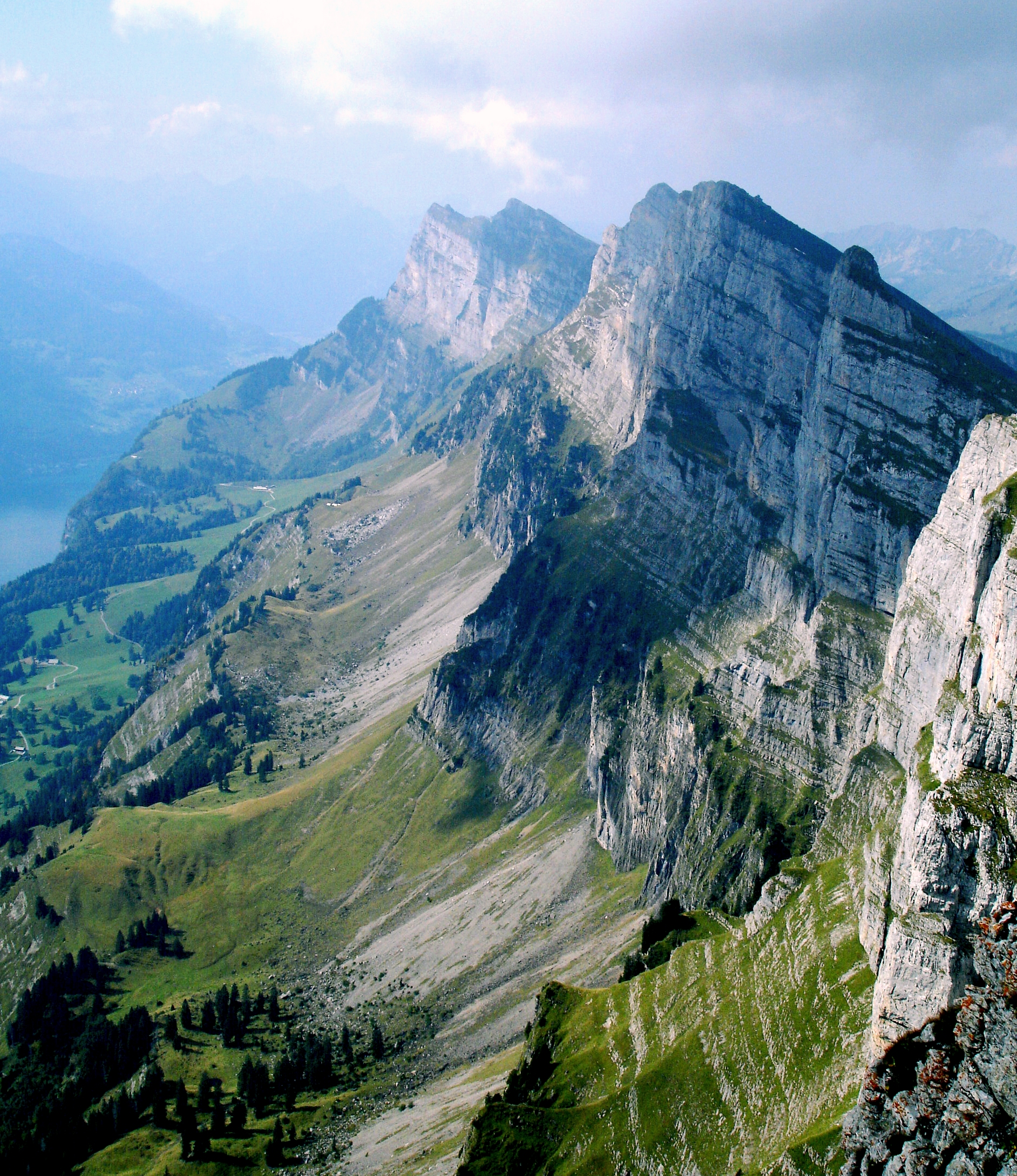
Summits of Churfirsten

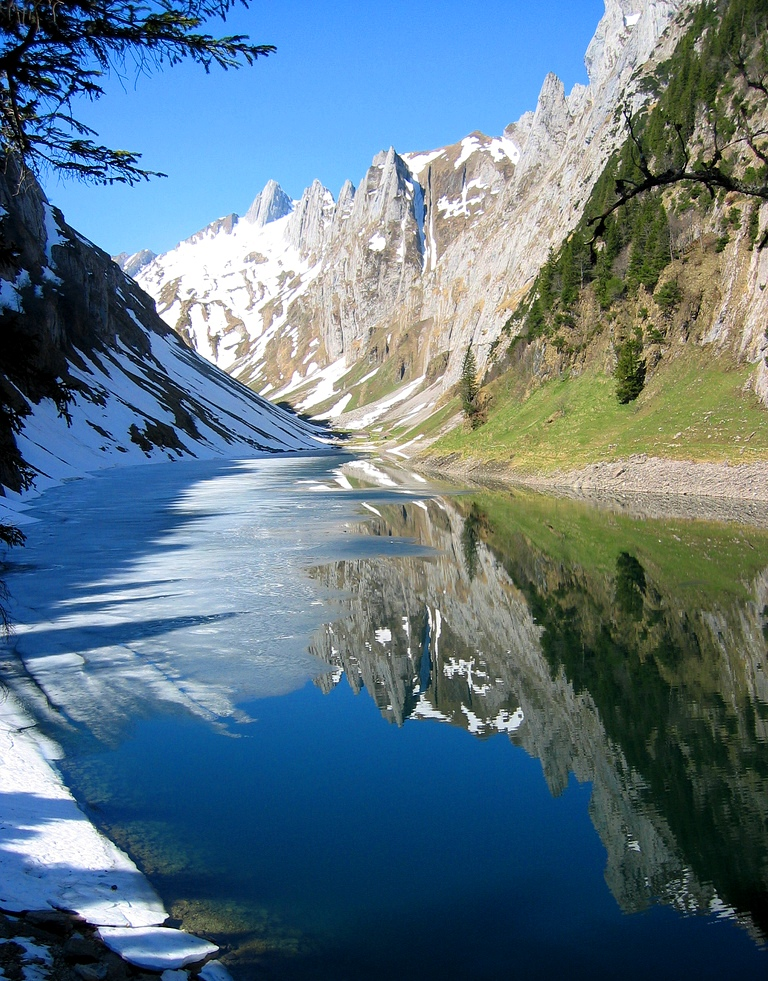
Falensee

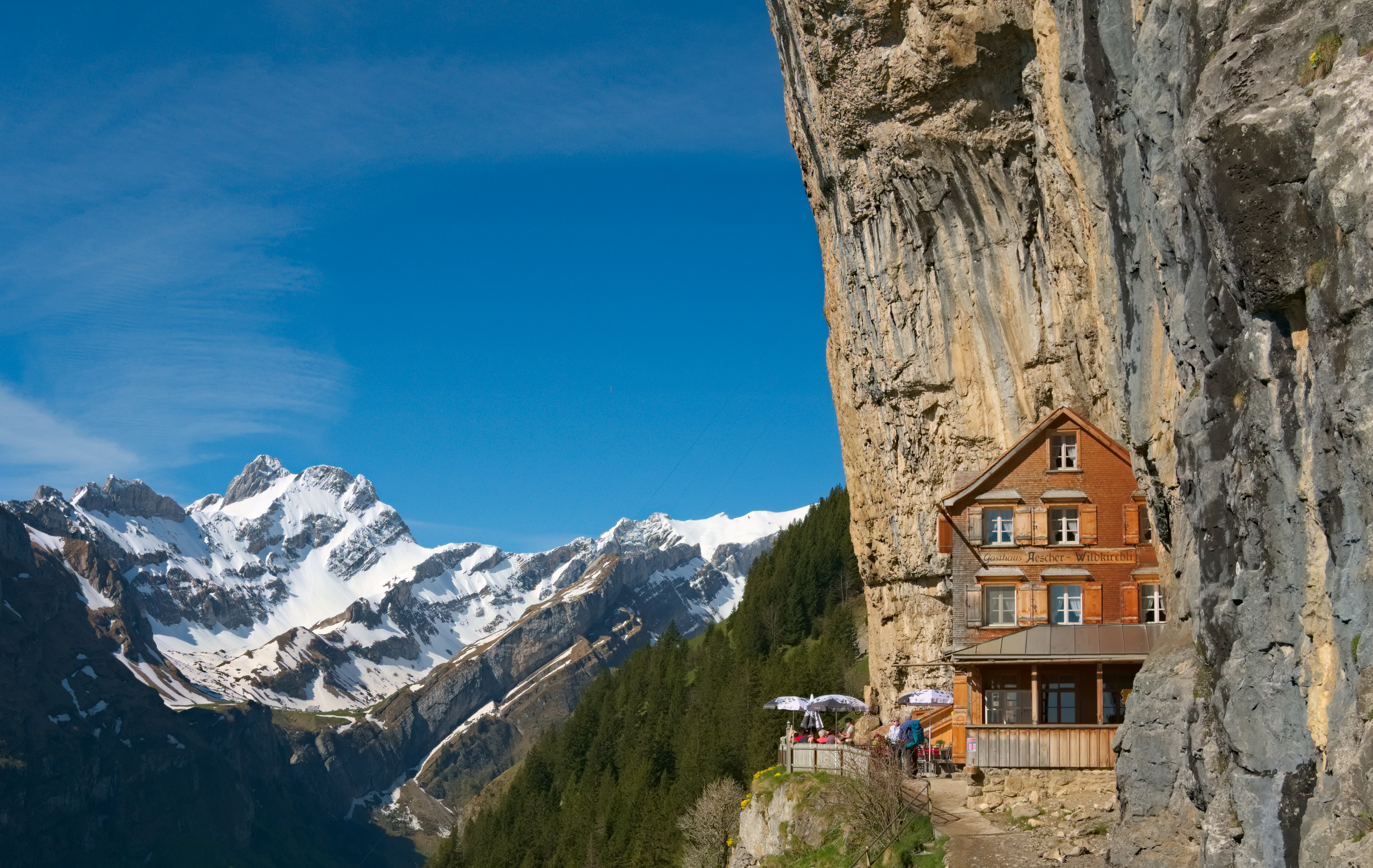
Restaurant Aescher-Wildkirchli near Ebenalp

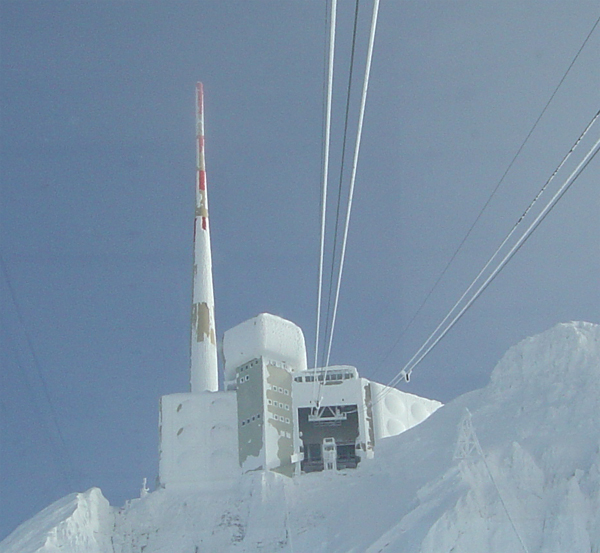
Summit of Säntis

== See also ==
- List of mountains of Appenzell Ausserrhoden
- List of mountains of Appenzell Innerrhoden
- List of mountains of the canton of St. Gallen
- Swiss Alps
