= Berchtold of Engelberg =

Swiss German Benedictine monk

Berchtold of Engelberg, German Berchtold von Engelberg (died 3 November 1197) was a Swiss German Benedictine monk, who was Abbot of Engelberg Abbey in Switzerland.

== Biography ==
Before becoming abbot he was a monk at Engelberg and a favorite disciple of the learned abbot, Frowin of Engelberg. When Frowin was on the point of dying he advised his monks to elect Berchtold as his successor. Accordingly, after Frowin's death, which occurred 27 March 1178, Berchtold was chosen abbot.

Following in Frowin's footsteps, he was intent on maintaining strict monastic discipline, the importance of which he inculcated by his own example. He also ordered his monks to reproduce many old writings, some of which are still extant in the library of Engelberg. The more learned monks were encouraged to write original works.

When Abbot Burchard (Note: Allegedly the second abbot of St. John's Abbey in the Thurtal, first mentioned in a document of Pope Eugene III dated 4 October 1152. "Burchard". Historisches Lexikon der Schweiz.) openly taught that the souls of the just had gone to heaven before the Resurrection of Christ, Berchtold himself wrote Apologia contra errorem Burchardi Abbatis S. Joannis in Thurthal seu Vallis Taurinae. The work cites the Bible and Church Fathers to argue against Burchard's position. Burchard became convinced of his error and retracted his previous position.

Berchtold procured for his monastery many financial privileges, among which was the right to levy tithes upon the churches of Stanz and Buochs, which were under his jurisdiction. The contemporaneous annals of Engelberg, which are published in "Mon. Germ. Hist., SS.", XVII, 280, relate that Berchtold foretold the death of Emperor Frederick Barbarossa. Later chronicles state that, through his blessing, the lake near Stanzstad was stocked with fish, and that shortly before his death he three times changed water into wine. He is generally represented in the act of blessing fish. His miracle of turning water into wine is also mentioned in an epigram beneath a representation of him which was kept in the choir of Engelberg up to the seventeenth century. At Engelberg his feast is celebrated on the anniversary of his death, and within the Roman Catholic Church he is now also known as "Blessed Berchtold".
