= Nesslau =

- Municipality
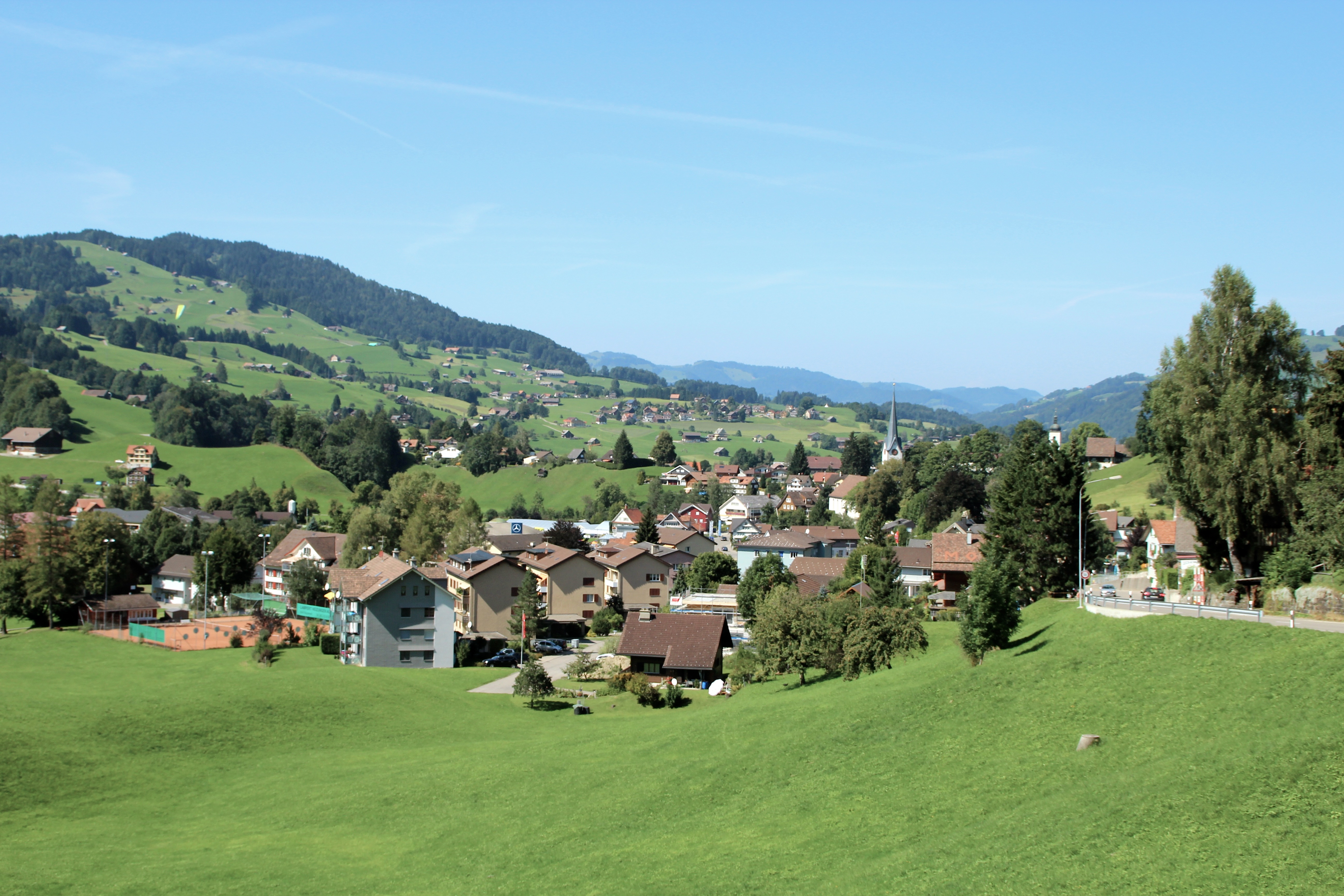
- Nesslau village

- Flag Coat of arms
- Location of Nesslau
- Location within Switzerland Location within Canton of St. Gallen
- Coordinates: 47°13′N 9°12′E
- Country: Switzerland
- Canton: St. Gallen
- District: Toggenburg

Government
  - Mayor: Rolf Huber

Area
  - Total: 92.72 km^{2} (35.80 sq mi)

Population (Dec 2011)
  - Total: 3,696
  - Density: 39.86/km^{2} (103.2/sq mi)
- Time zone: UTC+01:00 (CET)
  - Summer (DST): UTC+02:00 (CEST)
- Postal code: 9650 / 9651 / 9652 / 9643 / 9655
- SFOS number: 3360
- ISO 3166 code: CH-SG
- Surrounded by: Alt Sankt Johann, Amden, Ebnat-Kappel, Hemberg, Hundwil (AR), Schänis, Urnäsch (AR), Wildhaus
- Website: www.nesslau-krummenau.ch

Nesslau is a municipality in the Toggenburg district of the canton of St. Gallen, Switzerland. The current municipality was formed in 2013 and includes the villages of Nesslau, Krummenau and Stein.

== History ==
The area was incorporated into the domains of the counts of Toggenburg and the Abbey of St. Gall from the 12th century. Nesslau is first mentioned in 1178 as Mezellouo. In 1261 it was mentioned as Nesselove and ze dem Wassere. In 912 the hamlet of Lutenwil was mentioned as Lutherraheimara. Krummenau is first mentioned in 1266 as Crumbenowe. Sidwald developed into a regional cattle market from the 16th century. After a series of fires in the benedictine abbey of St. John's in the upper Toggenburg, the monastery was moved to Neu St. Johann near Sidwald in 1626. From 1831 to 2002, Nesslau was the administrative center of the constituency of Obertoggenburg. The railway connecting Ebnat-Kappel to Nesslau-Neu St. Johann was opened in 1912, resulting in development of tourism in the region. The former municipality of Nesslau was merged with Krummenau into Nesslau-Krummenau in 2005. A further merger with Stein in 2013 resulted in the current municipality of Nesslau.

The pre-2005 Nesslau had a different Community Identification Number (SFOS) (3355) and was smaller than the current municipality of Nesslau.

== Historic Population ==
The historical population is given in the following chart:

== Geography ==
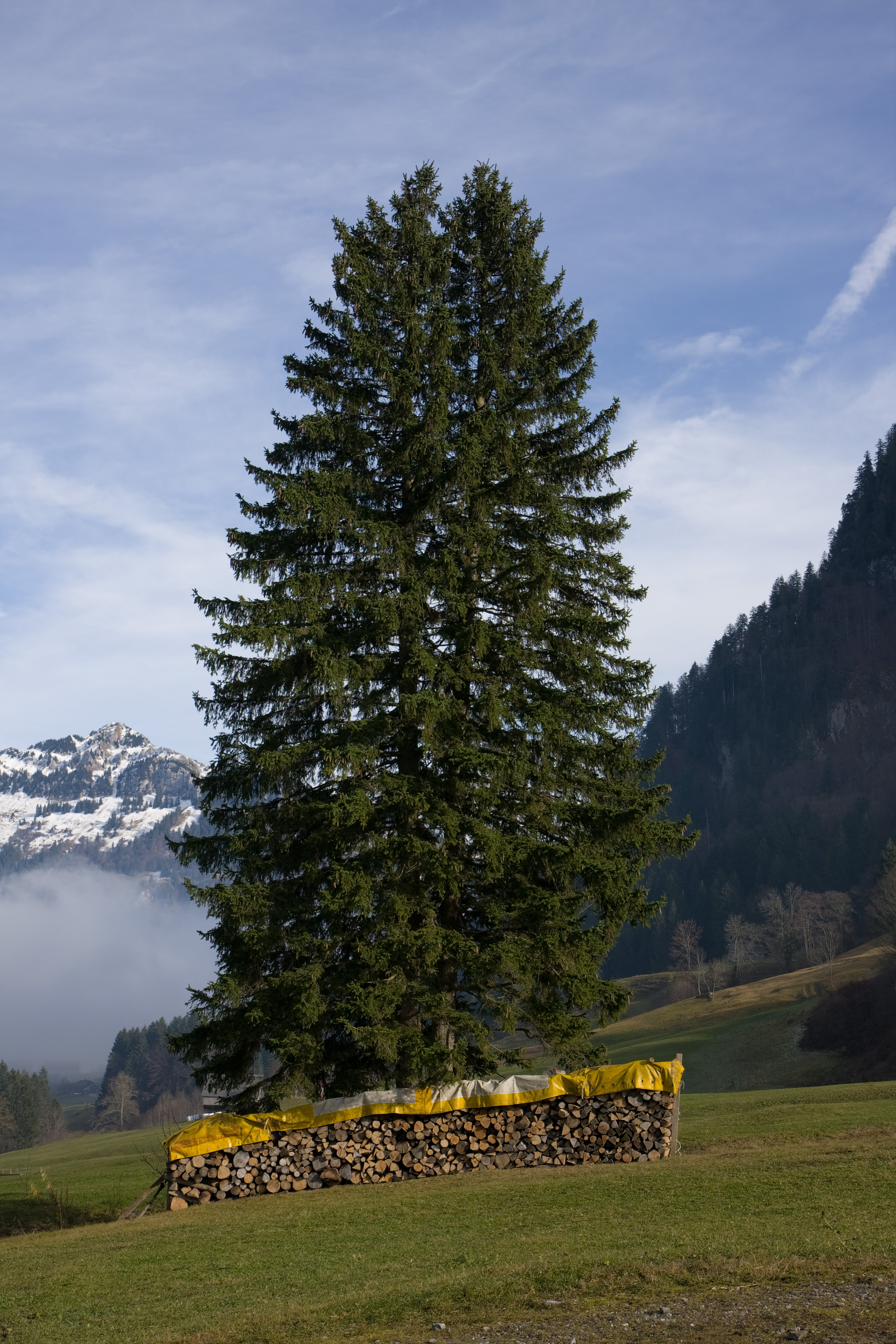
Fir tree and hillside near Stein

Aerial view (1949)

The new municipality of Nesslau has an area of 92.7 km^{2} (35.79 sq mi).

Nesslau-Krummenau had an area, as of 2006, of 80.4 km^{2} (31.0 sq mi). Of this area, 53.8% is used for agricultural purposes, while 36.5% is forested. Of the rest of the land, 3.2% is settled (buildings or roads) and the remainder (6.6%) is non-productive (rivers or lakes). The former municipality was located on both sides of the Thur river between the Speer and Stockberg and from the Silberplatten in the Säntis range over the Schwägalp Pass to Mistelegg. After the merger in 2005 it was, in terms of land area, the third largest municipality in the canton. It consists of the villages of Nesslau, Krummenau, Neu St. Johann, Dorf and Ennetbühl as well as the hamlets of Lutenwil, Krümmenschwil, Büel, Schneit, Laad, Schlatt (until the merger an exclave of Nesslau in Krummenau), Aemelsberg and Beiereggbis.

Stein had an area, as of 2006, of 12.3 km^{2} (4.7 sq mi). Of this area, 57.3% is used for agricultural purposes, while 37.3% is forested. Of the rest of the land, 2.2% is settled (buildings or roads) and the remainder (3.3%) is non-productive (rivers or lakes).

== Sights ==
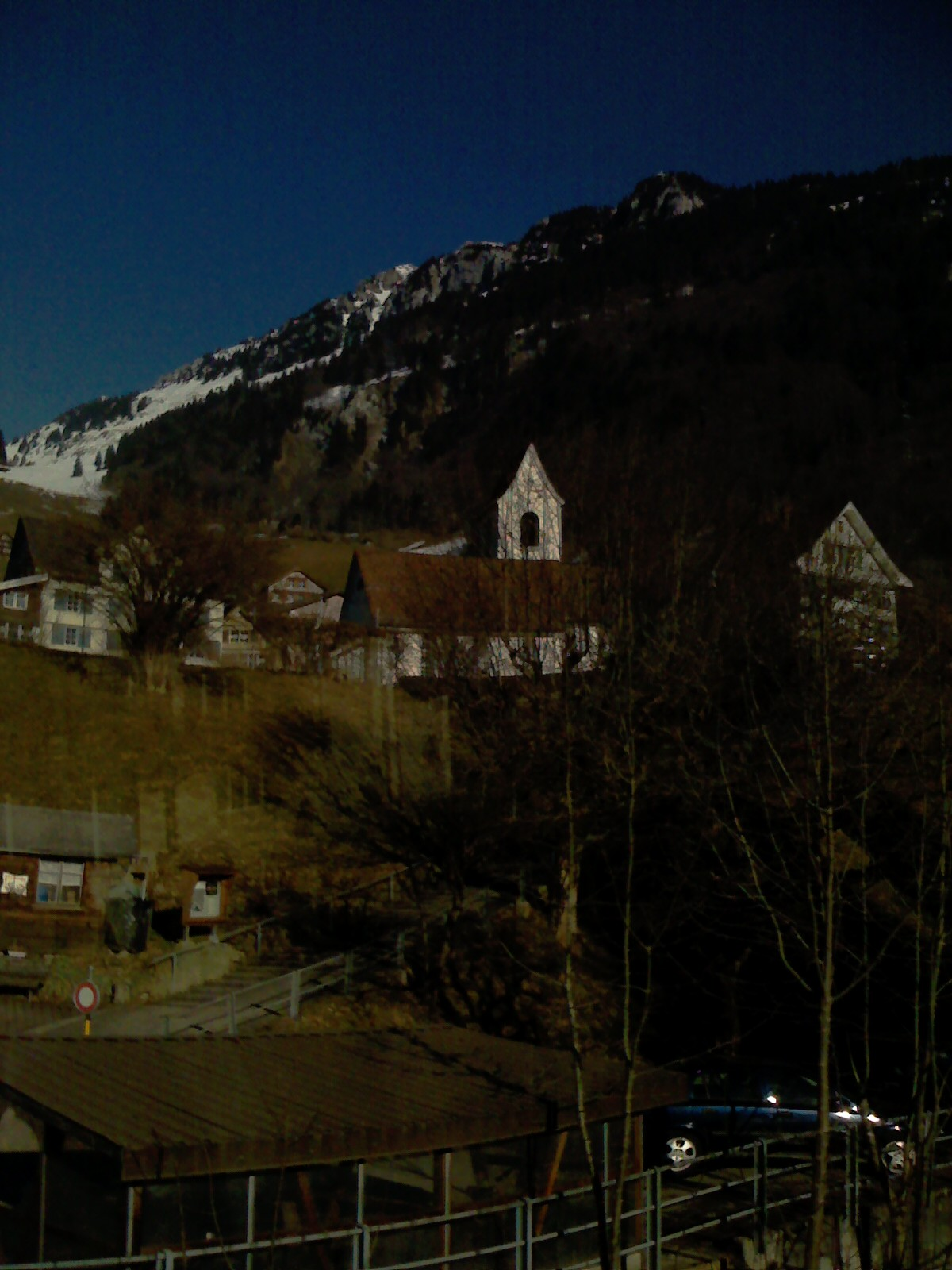
Reformed church

The village of Stein has a pair of notable churches. The Reformed church was built in 1497 and renovated in 1929. The north tower has a gabled roof. The Catholic church of St. Jacob was built in 1927-28, but the Rococo pulpit dates from 1770.

The Wolzenalp is a nearby hiking and skiing area.

== Heritage sites of national significance ==
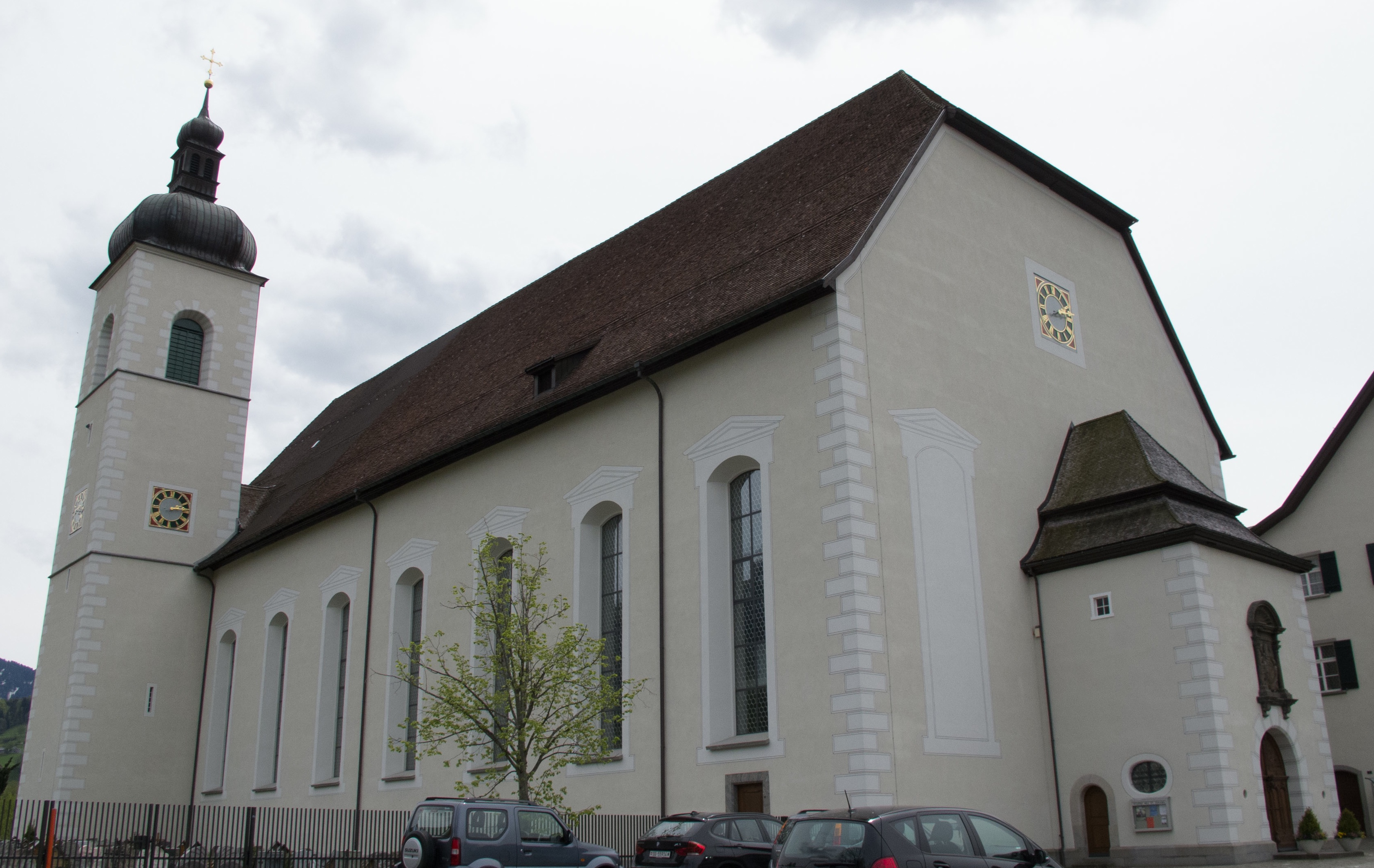
The former Benedictine Abbey of Neu St. Johann

The house at Sidwaldstrasse 6 and the former Benedictine Abbey of Neu St. Johann are listed as Swiss heritage sites of national significance. The village of Ennetbühl is designated as part of the Inventory of Swiss Heritage Sites.

== Transport ==
Nesslau-Neu St. Johann is the municipality's main railway station and the southern terminus of the Bodensee–Toggenburg railway line. Another railway station within the municipality is Krummenau railway station. Both are served hourly by the S2 service of the St. Gallen S-Bahn regional rail network.

In addition, Nesslau is also served by PostAuto bus routes to Schwägalp Pass, Wattwil railway station, and Wildhaus.
