= Gamsberg =

Mountain in the Appenzell Alps, Switzerland

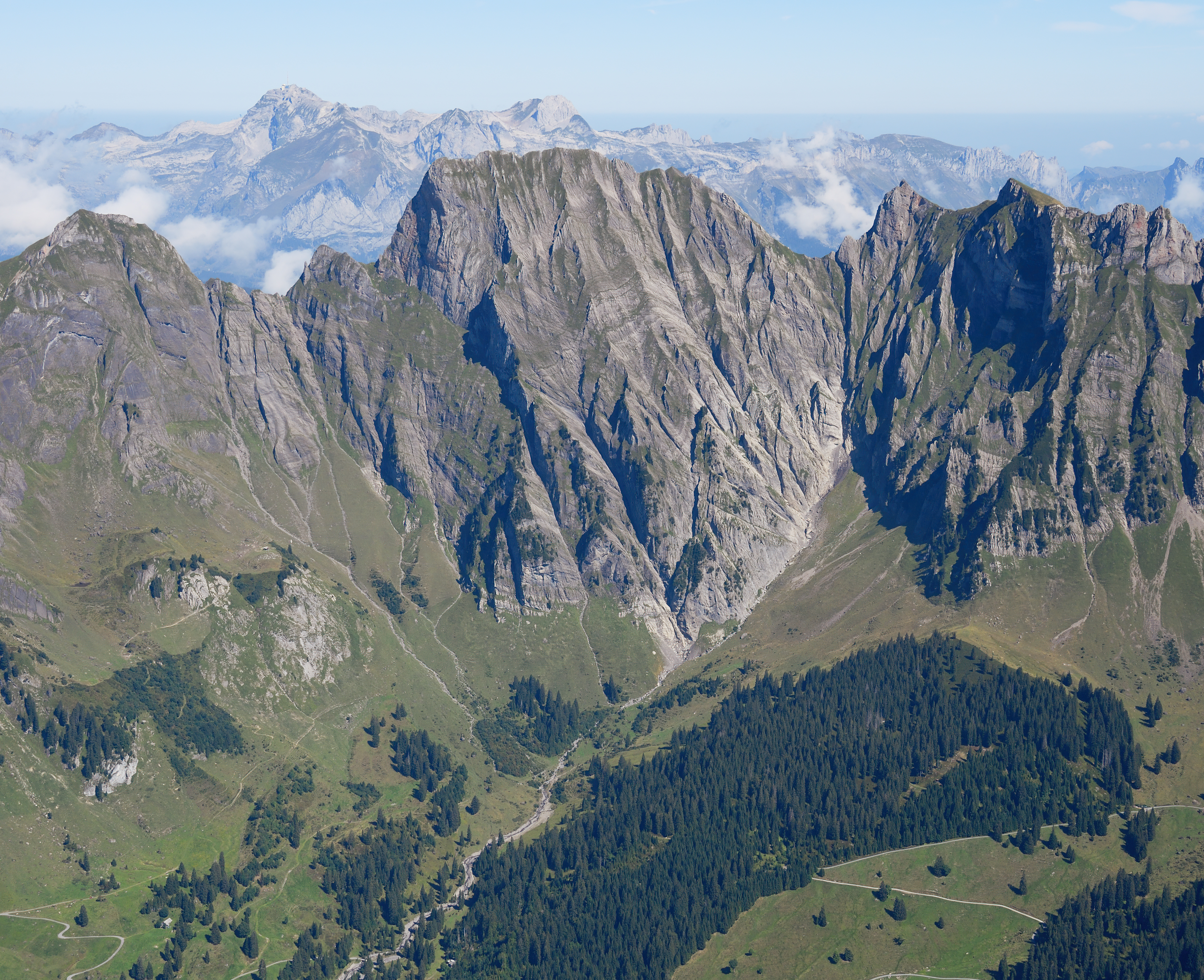
- Aerial view from the south

Highest point
- Elevation: 2,384 m (7,822 ft)
- Prominence: 1,357 m (4,452 ft)
- Parent peak: Säntis
- Isolation: 11.5 km (7.1 mi)
- Coordinates: 47°08′07″N 9°22′26″E

Geography
- Location within Switzerland Location within Canton of St. Gallen
- Location: Canton of St. Gallen
- Country: Switzerland
- Parent range: Appenzell Alps

The Gamsberg is a mountain in the Appenzell Alps, overlooking the region of Walenstadt in the canton of St. Gallen. Located in the Alvier group, it is the culminating point of the range lying between Lake Walenstadt and Toggenburg.

The summit is relatively difficult to access. There is no trail leading to the top.

The Gamsberg is part of the Alvier chain (Alvierkette or Alviergruppe), located southeast of the Churfirsten, together with the (from west to east): Fulfirst, Alvier, Gauschla and Gonzen, among others.

== See also ==
- List of mountains of the canton of St. Gallen
