= Gonzen =

Mountain in Switzerland

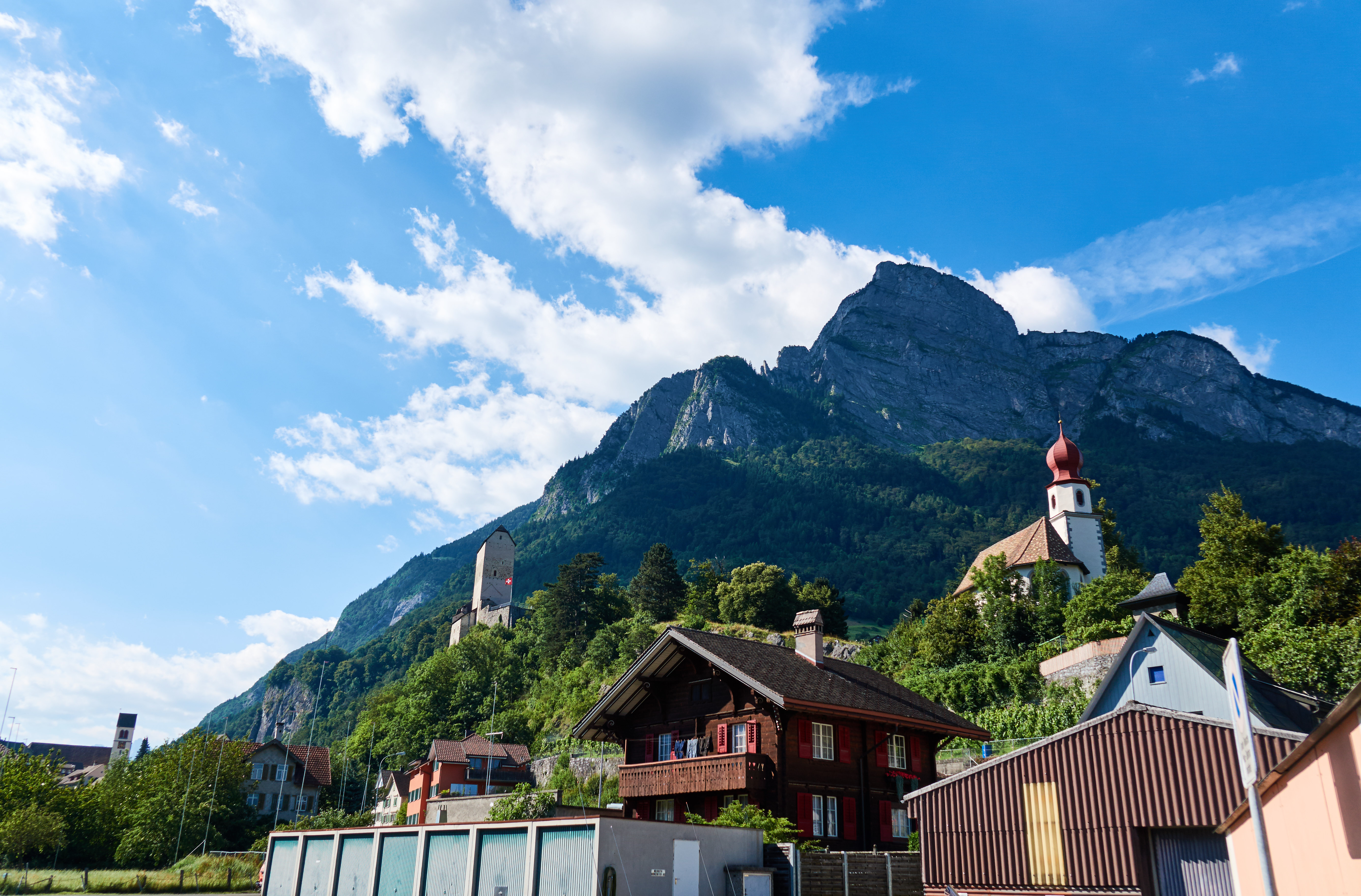
- The south face seen from Sargans

Highest point
- Elevation: 1,830 m (6,000 ft)
- Prominence: 162 m (531 ft)
- Parent peak: Gamsberg
- Coordinates: 47°4′3″N 9°26′2″E

Geography
- Location within Switzerland Location within Canton of St. Gallen
- Location: Canton of St. Gallen
- Country: Switzerland
- Parent range: Appenzell Alps

Climbing
- Easiest route: Trail

The Gonzen is a 1,830 metres (6,000 ft) high mountain of the Appenzell Alps, overlooking the Rhine Valley above Sargans, in the canton of St. Gallen, Switzerland. It lies at the southeastern end of the Alvier chain (Alvierkette or Alviergruppe), located southeast of the Churfirsten, together with the (from west to east): Gamsberg, Fulfirst, Alvier and Gauschla, among others.

The summit of the Gonzen can be reached via a trail on the northern side.

== See also ==
- List of mountains of the canton of St. Gallen
