= Hochalp =

Mountain in Switzerland

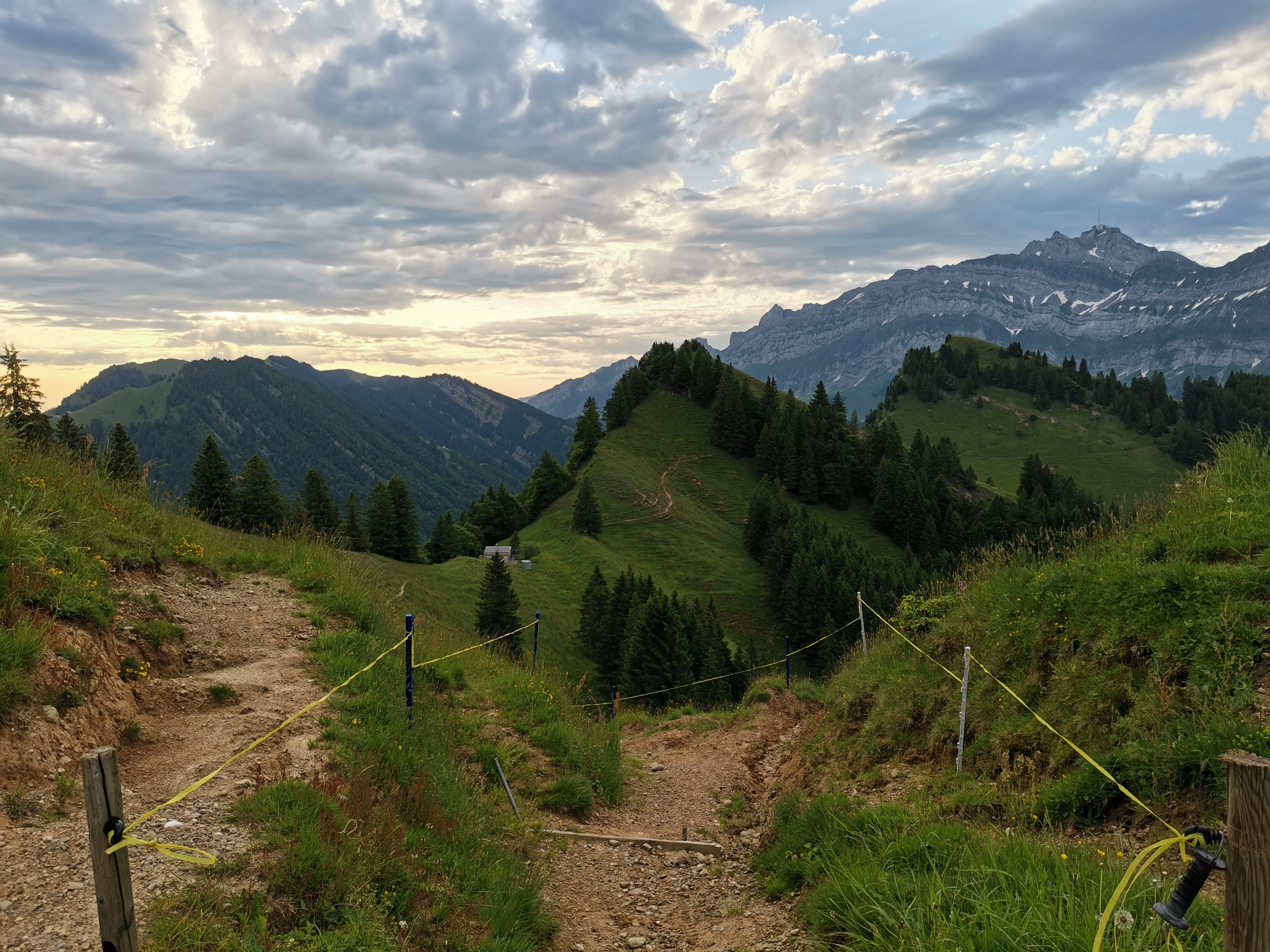
- View of Säntis from Hochalp

Highest point
- Elevation: 1,530 m (5,020 ft)
- Prominence: 260 m (850 ft)
- Parent peak: Hinterfallenchopf
- Coordinates: 47°16′31″N 9°15′14″E

Geography
- Location within Switzerland Location within Canton of Appenzell Ausserrhoden
- Location: Appenzell Ausserrhoden
- Country: Switzerland
- Parent range: Appenzell Alps

The Hochalp is a mountain of the Appenzell Alps, located south of Urnäsch in the canton of Appenzell Ausserrhoden, Switzerland.

== See also ==
- List of mountains of Appenzell Ausserrhoden
