= Stockberg =

Mountain in Switzerland

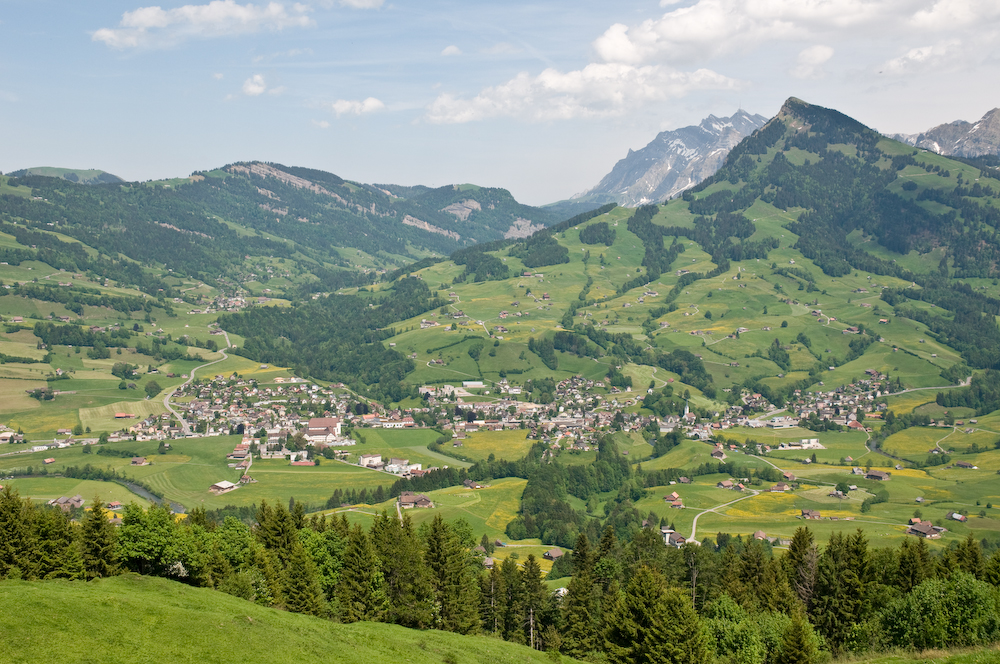
- The Stockberg (right summit) with the Säntis behind

Highest point
- Elevation: 1,782 m (5,846 ft)
- Prominence: 323 m (1,060 ft)
- Parent peak: Säntis
- Coordinates: 47°13′44″N 9°14′34″E

Geography
- Location within Switzerland Location within Canton of St. Gallen
- Location: Toggenburg, St. Gallen
- Country: Switzerland
- Parent range: Appenzell Alps

The Stockberg is a mountain of the Appenzell Alps, overlooking Nesslau in the Toggenburg region in the canton of St. Gallen, Switzerland. It lies on the range west of the Säntis (Alpstein).

== See also ==
- List of mountains of the canton of St. Gallen
