= Schnebelhorn =

Mountain in Switzerland

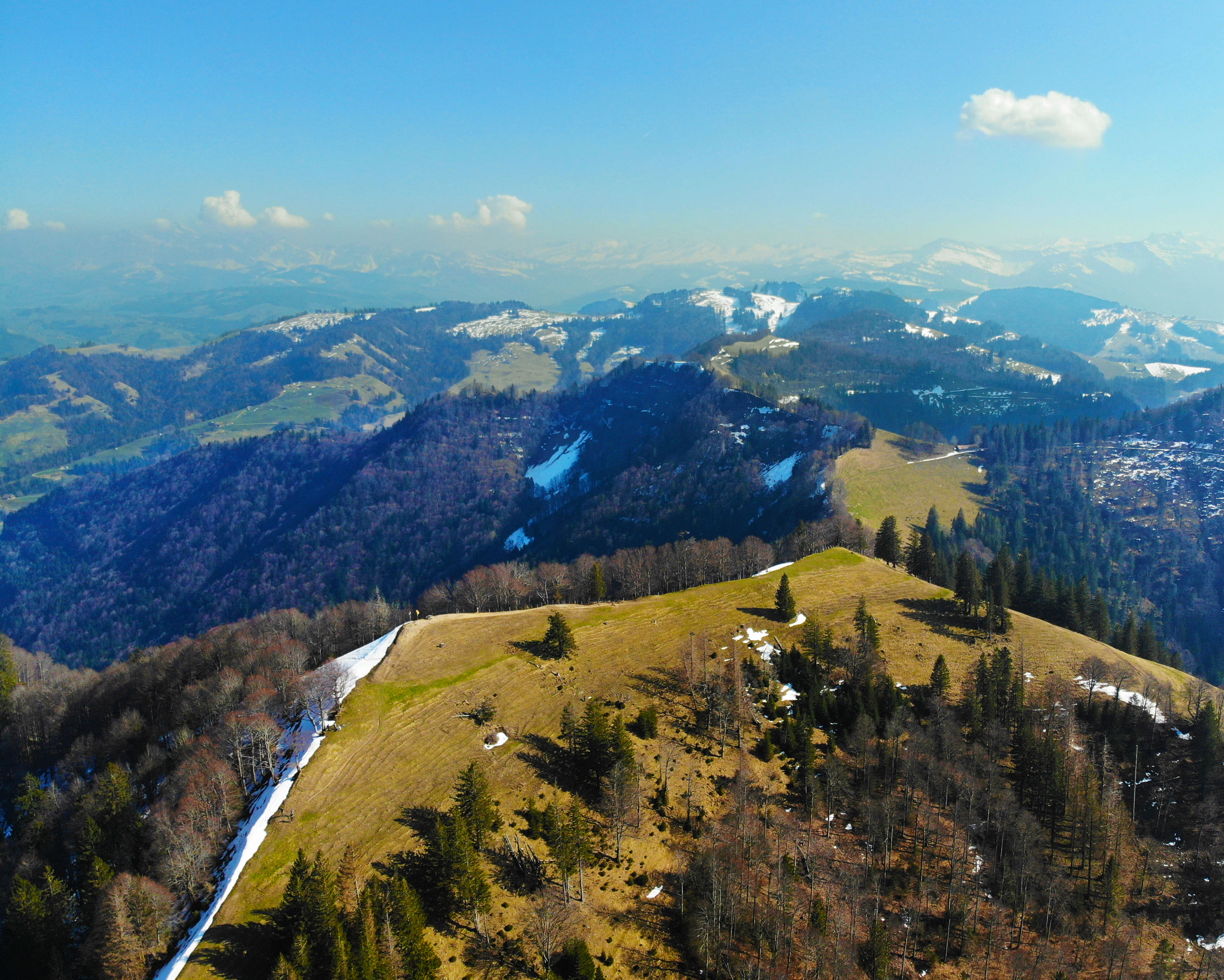
- Aerial view of the summit and surroundings

Highest point
- Elevation: 1,291.9 m (4,239 ft)
- Prominence: 112 m (367 ft)
- Parent peak: Tweralpspitz
- Isolation: 3.0 km (1.9 mi)
- Listing: Canton high point
- Coordinates: 47°19′32.2″N 8°58′46.7″E

Geography
- Location within Switzerland Location within Canton of St. Gallen Location within Canton of Zurich
- Location: Mosnang, St. Gallen; Fischenthal, Zurich
- Country: Switzerland
- Parent range: Appenzell Alps

The Schnebelhorn is a mountain located near Fischenthal in the Töss Valley, between the cantons of Zurich (Oberland region) and St. Gallen (Toggenburg). At 1,291 m (4,236 ft), it is the highest summit of the canton of Zurich.

Various trails lead to the summit from all sides. Most of the massif is covered by forests.

== Gallery ==
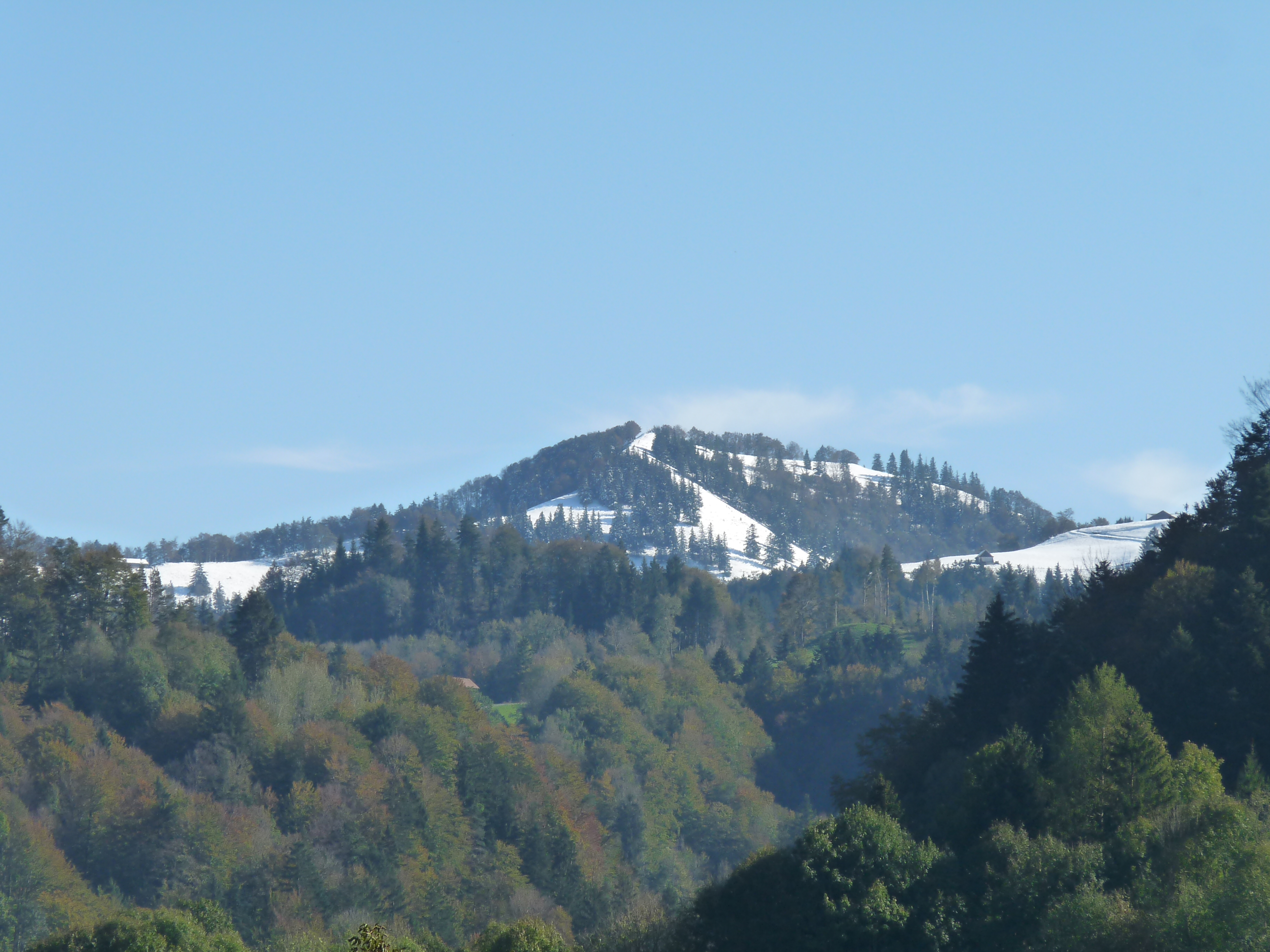
Schnebelhorn summit

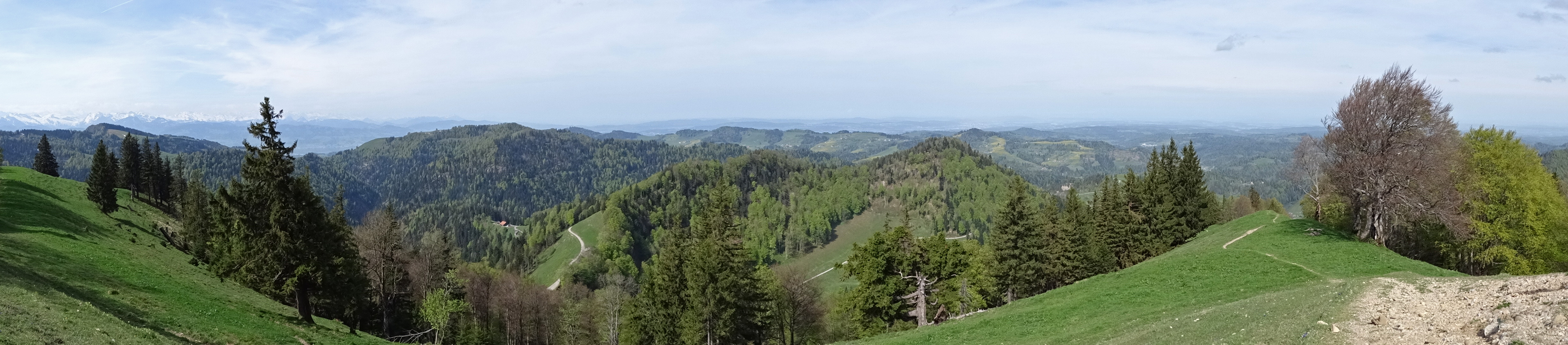
Panoramic view from summit

== See also ==
- List of mountains of the canton of St. Gallen
