= Gauschla =

Mountain in Switzerland

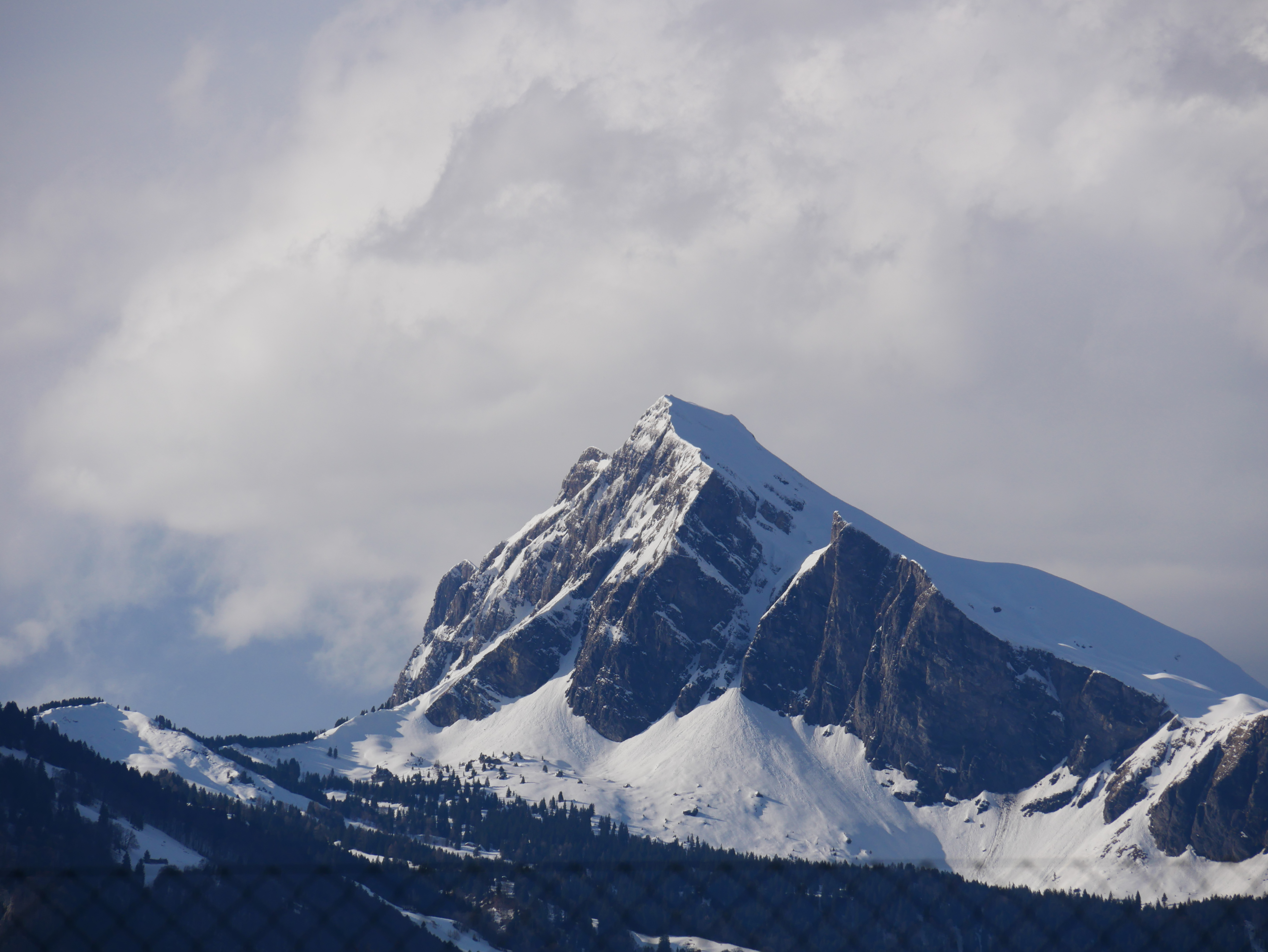
- The Gauschla, seen from Bad Ragaz

Highest point
- Peak: Gauschla
- Elevation: 2,310 m (7,580 ft)
- Prominence: 180 m (590 ft)
- Parent peak: Alvier
- Coordinates: 47°06′07″N 9°25′21″E

Naming
- Language of name: German

Geography
- Location within Switzerland Location within Canton of St. Gallen
- Country: Switzerland
- Canton: St. Gallen
- Parent range: Appenzell Alps
- Topo map: swisstopo

The Gauschla (2,310 m [7,580 ft]) is a mountain of the Appenzell Alps, located north of Sargans in the Canton of St. Gallen, Switzerland. It lies between the Walensee and the Alpine Rhine Valley, and 1 kilometre (0.62 mi) south-east of the Alvier (2,341 m [7,680 ft]). It is part of the Alvier chain (Alvierkette or Alviergruppe), located southeast of the Churfirsten, together with the (from west to east): Gamsberg, Fulfirst, Alvier and Gonzen, among others.

Just 600 metres (2,000 ft) southeast of the Gauschla, and clearly seen from the Alpine Rhine Valley, is the Girrenspitz (2,099 m [6,886 ft]).

The Seilbahn Palfries, an aerial tram, links the Seez Valley with the Palfries high plateau below the Gauschla. The valley station is located between Flums and Mels.

== See also ==
- List of mountains of the canton of St. Gallen
