= Bachtel Tower =

Coordinates: 47°17′45″N 8°53′15″E

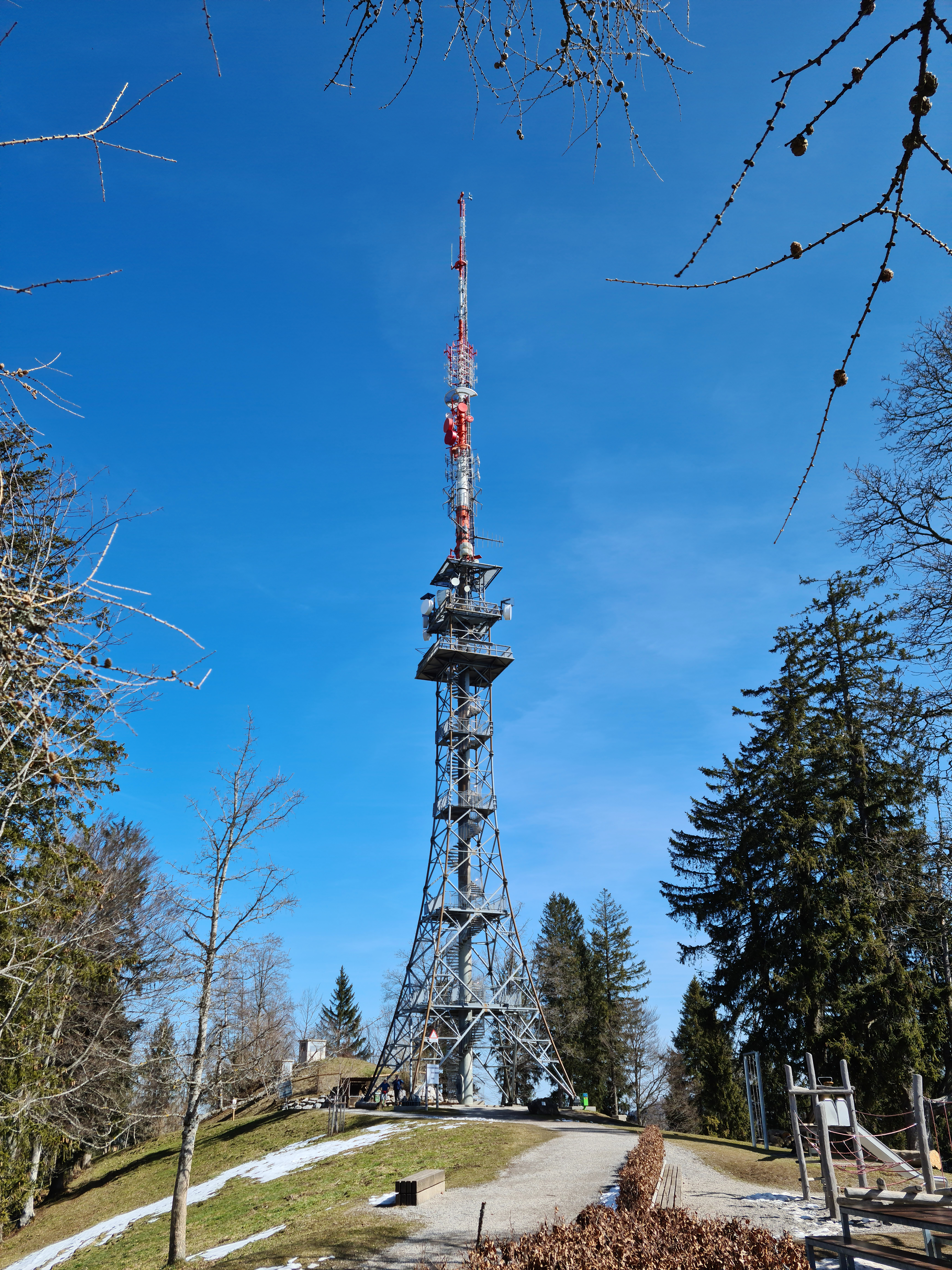
Bachtel Tower 2021

Bachtel Tower (German: Bachtelturm) is a 75-metre-high observation and transmitting tower located on the summit of the Bachtel mountain in the Zürcher Oberland region of Switzerland. Built in 1986, it has an observation platform 30 metres above ground level, offering views from Lake Zurich to the Black Forest in good weather. The structure replaced an earlier steel observation tower from 1893, which is now re-erected on the Pfannenstiel.

== History ==
In 1873, a wooden observation tower was built on the Bachtel. To increase its attractiveness, the landlord of the first guest house on the mountain added a viewing platform with coloured windows. In January 1890, a winter storm swept over the area, destroying the tower and leaving behind only timber and shards of coloured glass.

Members of the Swiss Alpine Club’s Section Bachtel collected funds to build a replacement steel tower with a viewing platform and a peak map showing the surrounding mountains. Erected in 1893, the steel lattice tower remained on the summit until 1985, when it was dismantled because it was no longer suitable as an antenna support. After renovation, it was re-erected seven years later on the Pfannenstiel, where it is still known as the old Bachtel tower.

== Tourism ==
The Bachtel, sometimes called the “Rigi” of the Zürcher Oberland, is known for wide views. Travel guides from the mid-19th century praised its panorama. In 1851, Gottfried von Escher described a broad view stretching from the upper part of Lake Zurich to the Sentis and the high peaks of the Bernese Oberland. The mountain also attracted members of the educated middle class, and in 1849 the panorama artist Heinrich Keller produced an 360 degree view from Bachtel Kulm.

== Gallery ==
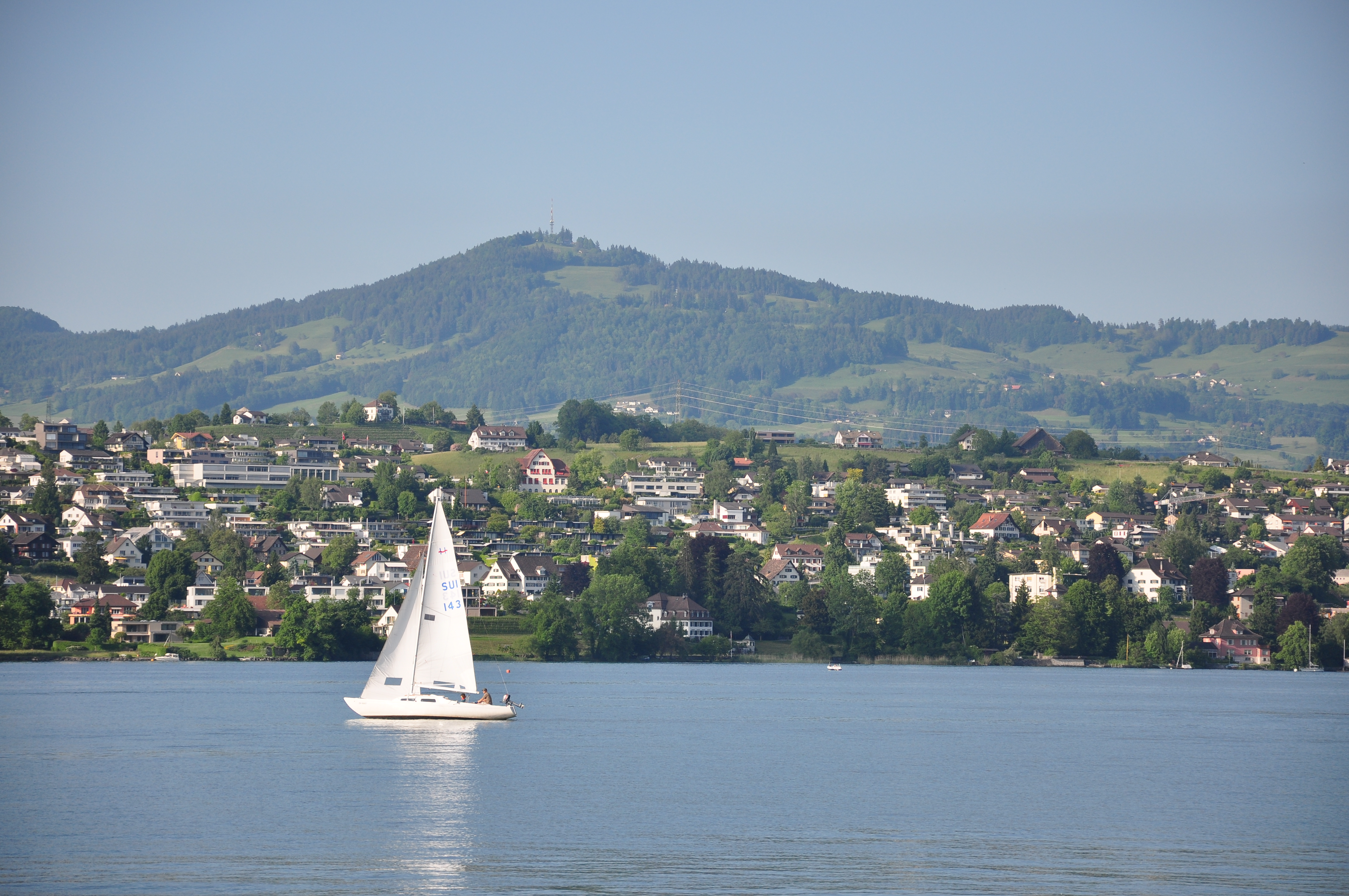
Bachtel mountain viewed from Lake Zürich at Kempraten, near Rapperswil

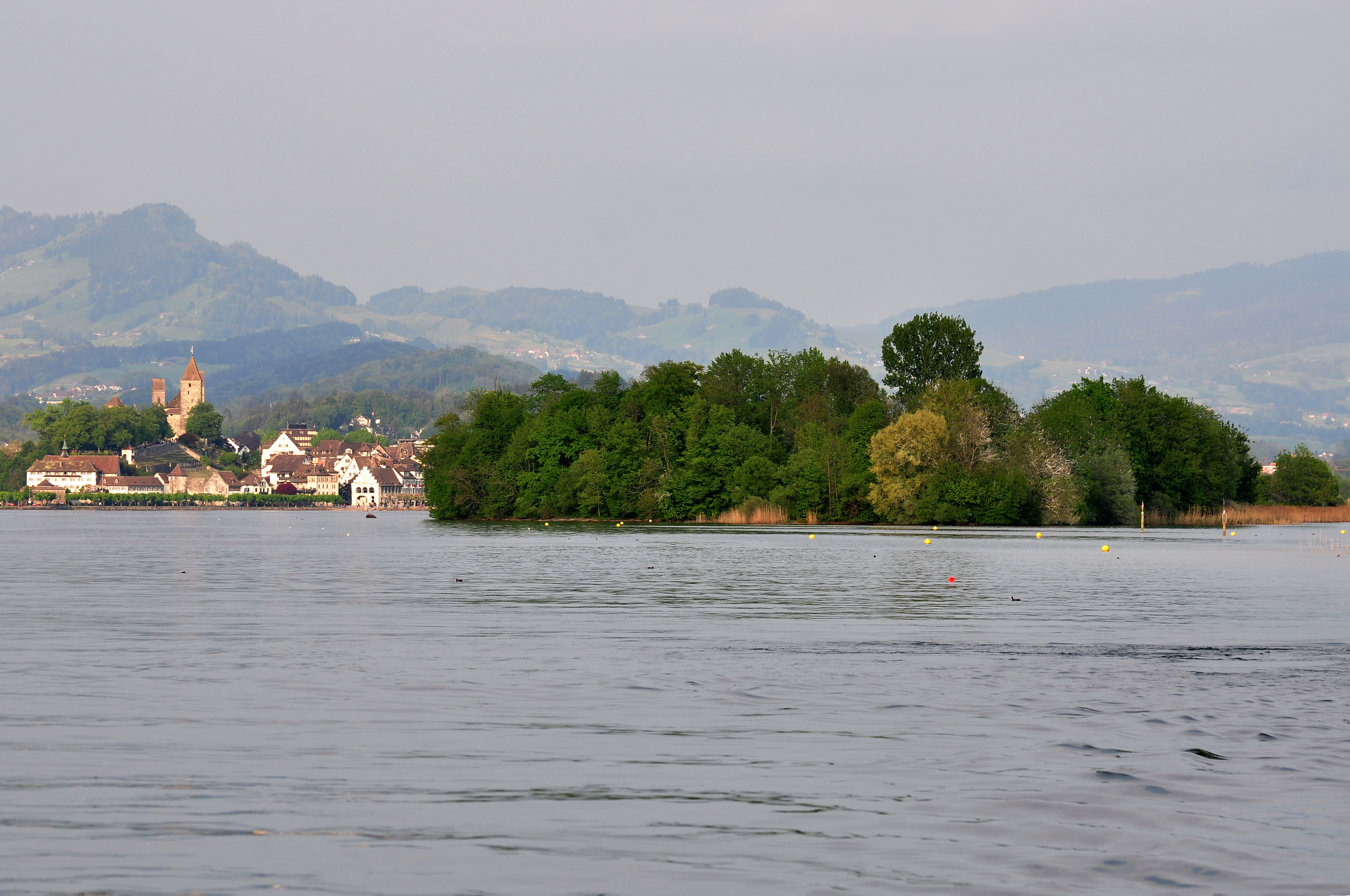
Bachtel mountain seen from Lake Zürich, with Ufenau and Lützelau islands in the foreground

== See also ==
- List of mountains of Switzerland
- List of tallest structures in Switzerland
- Tourism in Switzerland
