= Alvier (mountain) =

Mountain in the Appenzell Alps

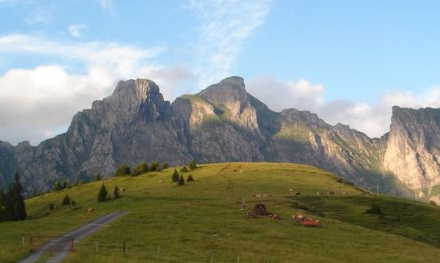

Highest point
- Elevation: 2,343 m (7,687 ft)
- Prominence: 243 m (797 ft)
- Parent peak: Gamsberg
- Coordinates: 47°06′35.1″N 09°24′53.4″E

Geography
- Location within Switzerland Location within Canton of St. Gallen
- Location: Canton of St. Gallen
- Country: Switzerland
- Parent range: Appenzell Alps

The Alvier (German pronunciation: [alˈfiːɐ̯]) is a mountain in the Appenzell Alps, located halfway between Lake Walen (Walensee) and the Alpine Rhine Valley in the canton of St. Gallen, Switzerland.

It is one of the main summits of the chain separating the valleys of the rivers Seez and Alpine Rhine. Although involving a long hike, the summit is easily accessible by trails from both sides.

The Alvier is part of the Alvier chain (Alvierkette or Alviergruppe), located southeast of the Churfirsten, together with the (from west to east): Gamsberg, Fulfirst, Gauschla and Gonzen, among others.

== See also ==
- List of mountains of the canton of St. Gallen
