= Fulfirst =

Mountain in Switzerland

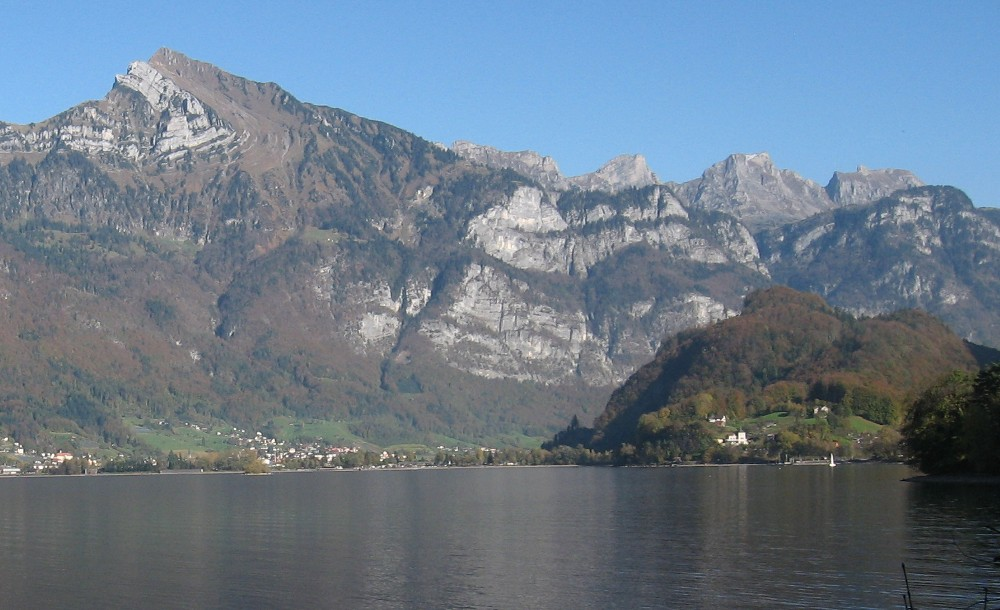
- Sichelkamm (left), and Fulfirst, Alvier and Gauschla in the background (seen from Lake Walen)

Highest point
- Elevation: 2,384 m (7,822 ft)
- Prominence: 219 m (719 ft)
- Parent peak: Gamsberg
- Coordinates: 47°7′47.5″N 9°23′48″E

Geography
- Location within Switzerland Location within Canton of St. Gallen
- Location: Canton of St. Gallen
- Country: Switzerland
- Parent range: Appenzell Alps

The Fulfirst is a mountain of the Appenzell Alps, located north of Flums in the canton of St. Gallen, Switzerland. It lies between the Lake Walen (Walensee) and the Alpine Rhine Valley. It has two summits: the Gross Fulfirst at 2,384 m (7,822 ft), and the Chli Fulfirst at 2,372 m (7,782 ft).

The Fulfirst is part of the Alvier chain (Alvierkette or Alviergruppe), located southeast of the Churfirsten, together with the (from west to east): Gamsberg, Alvier, Gauschla and Gonzen, among others.

== See also ==
- List of mountains of the canton of St. Gallen
