= St. John's Abbey in the Thurtal =

Coordinates: 47°11′40.27″N 9°17′8.44″E

St. John's Abbey in the Thurtal (German: Kloster St. Johann im Thurtal) was a Benedictine monastery originally established in Alt St. Johann in the Canton of St. Gallen, Switzerland, in the mid-12th century.

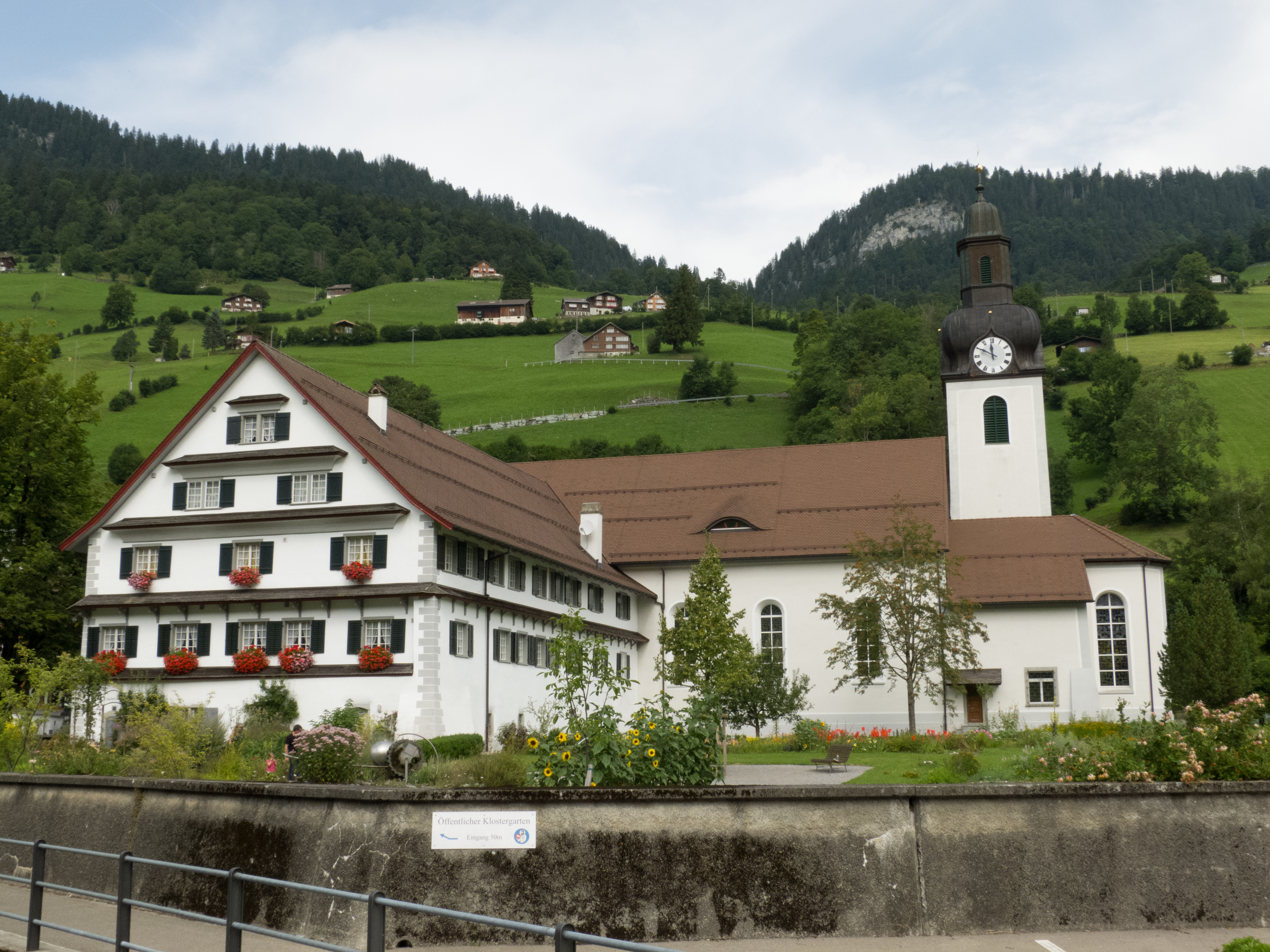
former priory and church Alt St. Johann

The oldest written record of it is dated 4 October 1152, when Pope Eugene III took the monastery into his protection. The pope confirmed the monastery's possessions and free election of its abbot and Vogt.

On 24 October 1178 Pope Alexander III confirmed the abbey's extended possessions.

In 1227/1228, the king became Vogt of the abbey. In December 1231, Emperor Frederick II issued a Golden Bull confirming his obligations as Vogt of the abbey.

The abbey owned numerous estates in Toggenburg and in the Rhine valley: St. Johann, Stein, Nesslau, Kappel, St. Peterzell and Mogelsberg; and in Vorarlberg in Austria, near Feldkirch, in Klaus, Götzis and Altach.

The abbey also frequently bought land in the territory which is now the principality of Liechtenstein, most notably the prominent Red House in Vaduz, which it purchased in 1525 from the heirs of the medieval owners, the Vaisli family.

The abbey's high point was during the 14th century. It survived the Reformation, but lost its independence in 1555, when it became a priory of St. Gall's Abbey.

In 1626 the buildings were severely damaged by fire, and the monks were afflicted by a mysterious illness and the community moved along the valley to a new location at Sidwald near Nesslau, since then known as Neu St. Johann. On the site of the old monastery a parish church was built, with a priest's house.

The new monastery buildings in Nesslau, which were completed by 1680, were in a magnificent Rococo style. Toggenburg was an area of mixed denominations, and the priory was an instrument of the Counter-Reformation under the leadership of the Prince-Abbots of St. Gallen.

The priory was dissolved in 1805. The former monastic church became the Roman Catholic parish church of the parish of Neu St. Johann. The remaining buildings now accommodate a remedial educational centre known as the Johanneum.

== Sources ==
- Helvetia Sacra online (in German and French)
- Hans Büchler: Krummenau in German, French and Italian in the online Historical Dictionary of Switzerland, 29 October 2005.
- Alt St. Johann website: history (in German)
