= Stein, St. Gallen =

Stein
- Former municipality
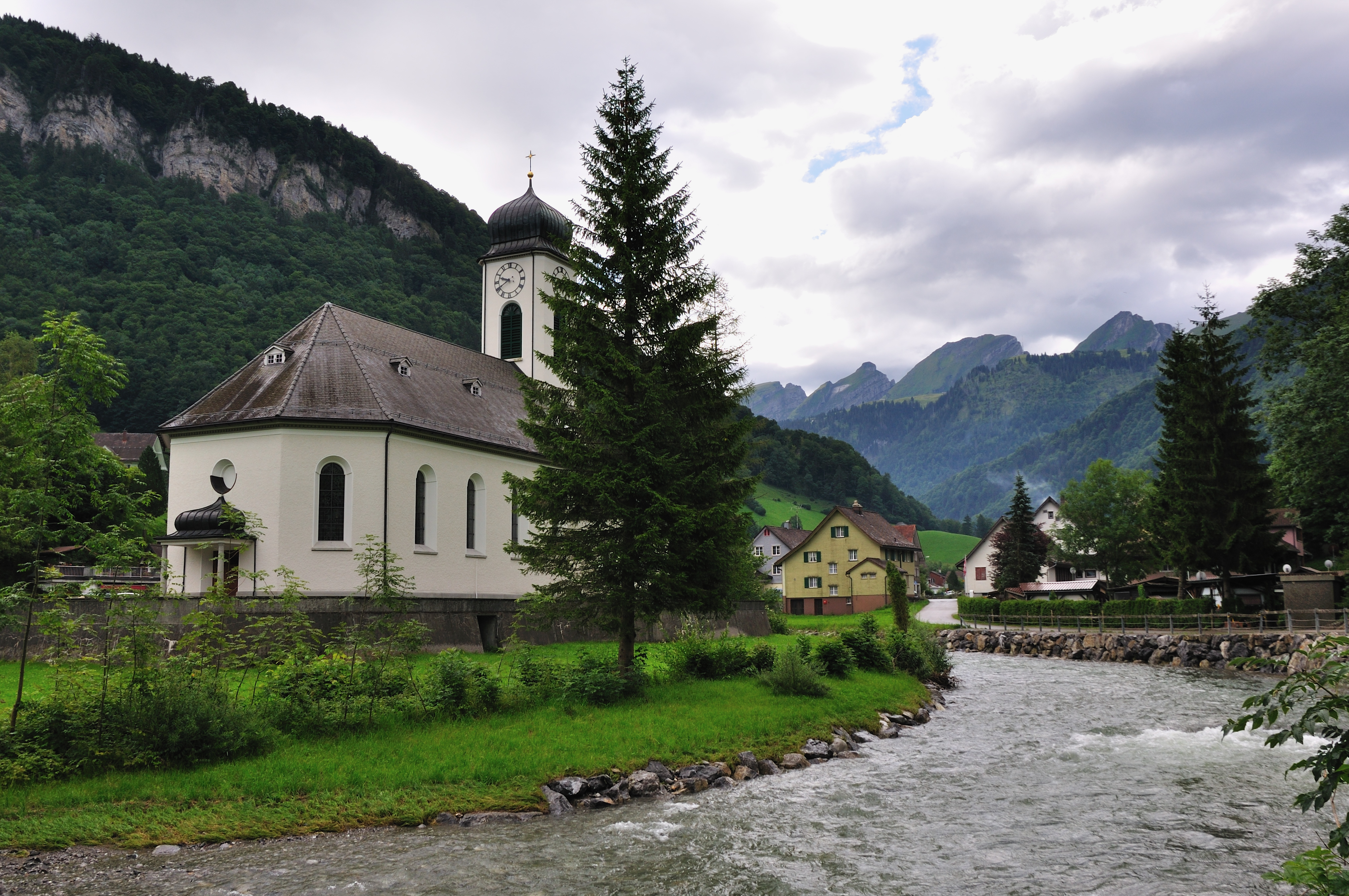

- Coat of arms
- Location of Stein
- Location within Switzerland Location within Canton of St. Gallen
- Coordinates: 47°12′N 9°14′E
- Country: Switzerland
- Canton: St. Gallen
- District: Toggenburg

Government
  - Mayor: Ueli Schärer

Area
  - Total: 12.24 km^{2} (4.73 sq mi)
- Elevation: 838 m (2,749 ft)

Population (Dec 2011)
  - Total: 374
  - Density: 30.6/km^{2} (79.1/sq mi)
- Time zone: UTC+01:00 (CET)
  - Summer (DST): UTC+02:00 (CEST)
- Postal code: 9655
- SFOS number: 3356
- ISO 3166 code: CH-SG
- Surrounded by: Alt Sankt Johann, Amden, Nesslau-Krummenau
- Website: www.stein-sg.ch

Stein (German pronunciation: [ʃtaɪn]) is a former municipality in the Wahlkreis (constituency) of Toggenburg in the canton of St. Gallen in Switzerland. The municipalities of Nesslau-Krummenau and Stein merged on 1 January 2013 into the new municipality of Nesslau.

== Geography ==
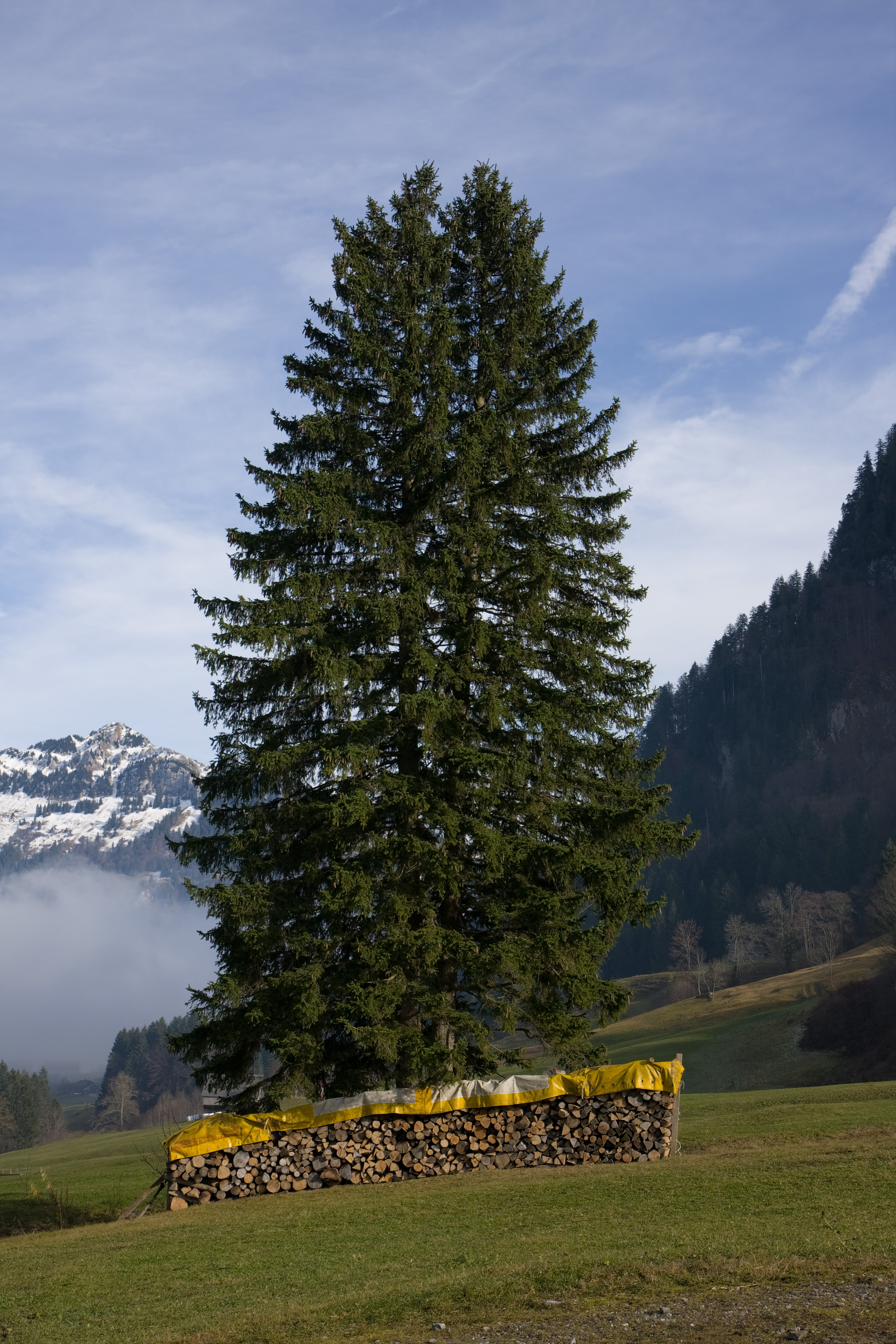
Fir tree and hillside near Stein

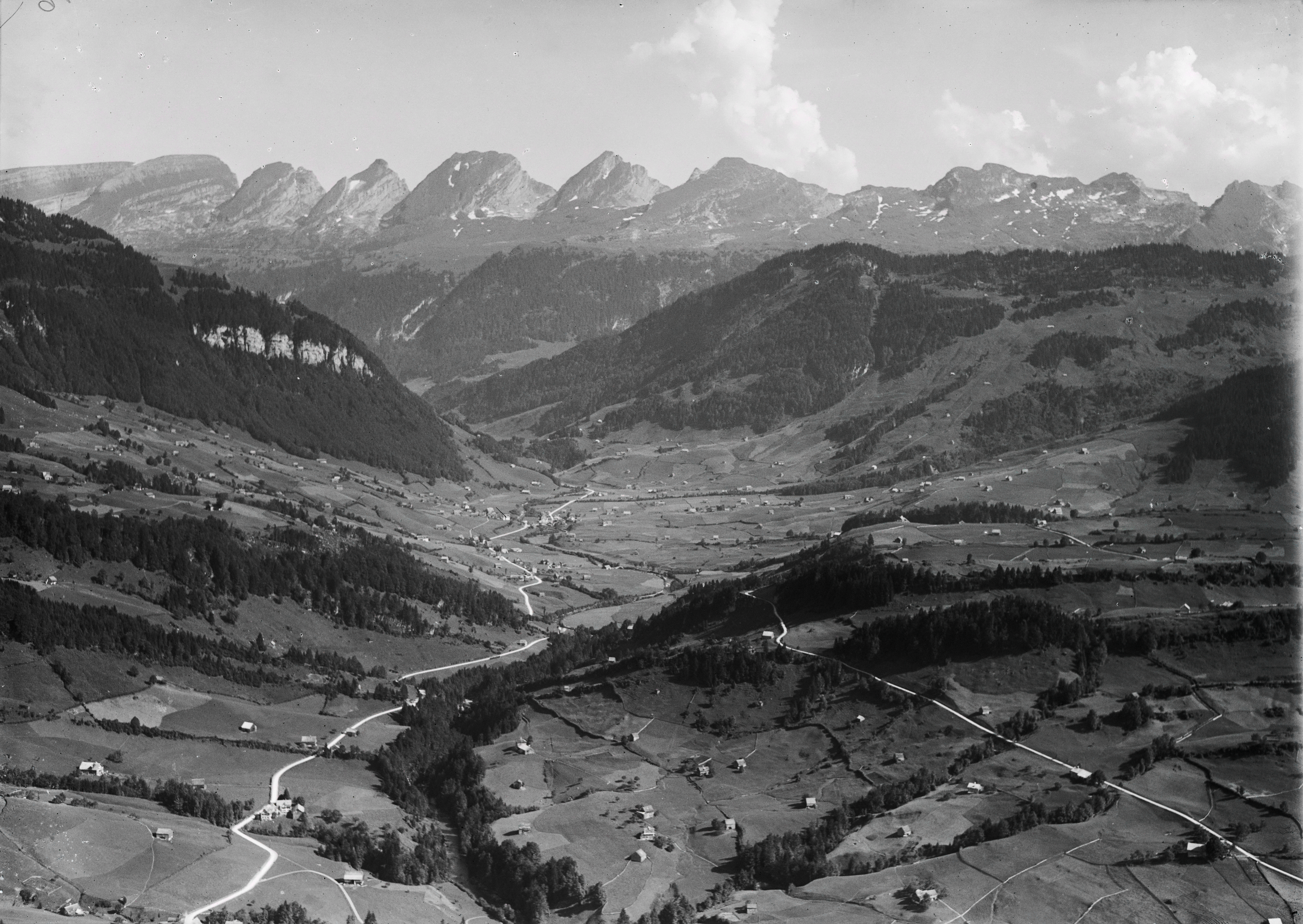
Aerial view by Walter Mittelholzer (1919)

Stein had an area, as of 2006, of 12.3 km^{2} (4.7 sq mi). Of this area, 57.3% is used for agricultural purposes, while 37.3% is forested. Of the rest of the land, 2.2% is settled (buildings or roads) and the remainder (3.3%) is non-productive (rivers or lakes).

== Coat of arms ==
The blazon of the municipal coat of arms is Or on a mount of the same a Stone Cliff vert. This is a simple example of canting as German: Stein means stone. The stone on the coat of arms is the Goggeienberg, a small, local crag.

== Demographics ==
Stein had a population (as of Dec 2011) of 374. As of 2007, about 3.7% of the population was made up of foreign nationals. Of the foreign population, (as of 2000), 5 are from Germany, 1 person is from Italy,2 are from ex-Yugoslavia, and 2 are from another country. Over the last 10 years the population has decreased at a rate of -7.4%. Most of the population (as of 2000) speaks German (98.2%), with Finnish being second most common ( 0.8%) and Italian being third ( 0.3%). Of the Swiss national languages (as of 2000), 391 speak German, 1 person speaks, Italian,

The age distribution, as of 2000, in Stein is; 61 children or 15.3% of the population are between 0 and 9 years old and 56 teenagers or 14.1% are between 10 and 19. Of the adult population, 38 people or 9.5% of the population are between 20 and 29 years old. 52 people or 13.1% are between 30 and 39, 48 people or 12.1% are between 40 and 49, and 62 people or 15.6% are between 50 and 59. The senior population distribution is 38 people or 9.5% of the population are between 60 and 69 years old, 21 people or 5.3% are between 70 and 79, there are 19 people or 4.8% who are between 80 and 89, and there are 3 people or 0.8% who are between 90 and 99.

In 2000 there were 42 persons (or 10.6% of the population) who were living alone in a private dwelling. There were 80 (or 20.1%) persons who were part of a couple (married or otherwise committed) without children, and 243 (or 61.1%) who were part of a couple with children. There were 14 (or 3.5%) people who lived in single parent home, while there are 6 persons who were adult children living with one or both parents, and 13 who are either institutionalized or live in another type of collective housing.

In the 2007 federal election the most popular party was the SVP which received 36.8% of the vote. The next three most popular parties were the CVP (23.7%), the FDP (15.1%) and the SP (7.8%).

In Stein about 67.2% of the population (between age 25-64) have completed either non-mandatory upper secondary education or additional higher education (either university or a Fachhochschule). Out of the total population in Stein, as of 2000, the highest education level completed by 129 people (32.4% of the population) was Primary, while 136 (34.2%) have completed their secondary education, 27 (6.8%) have attended a Tertiary school, and 5 (1.3%) are not in school. The remainder did not answer this question.

== Sights ==
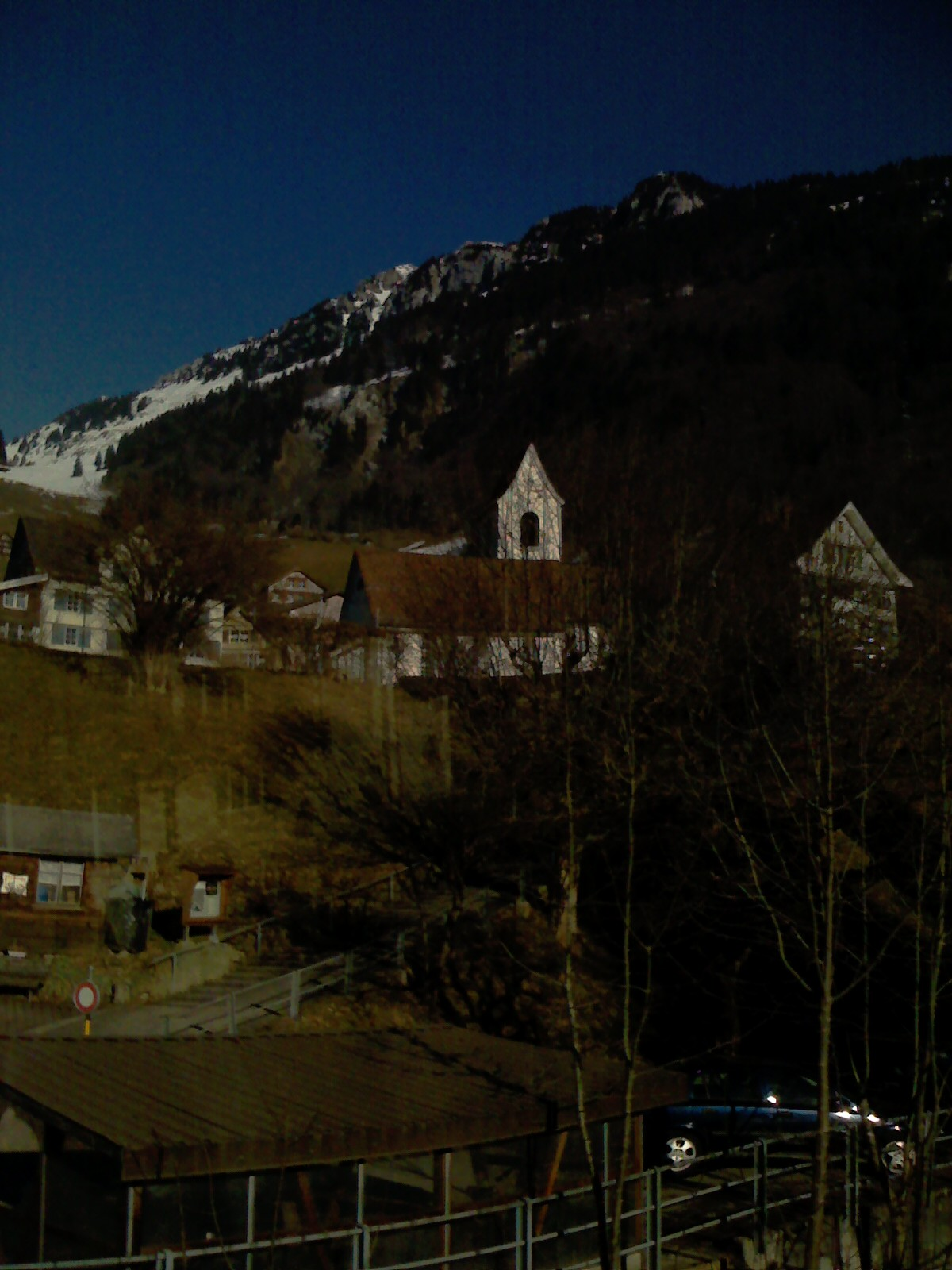
Reformed church

The village of Stein has a pair of notable churches. The Reformed church was built in 1497 and renovated in 1929. The north tower has a gabled roof. The Catholic church of St. Jacob was built in 1927-28, but the Rococo pulpit dates from 1770.

== Economy ==
As of 2007, Stein had an unemployment rate of 0.79%. As of 2005, there were 80 people employed in the primary economic sector and about 32 businesses involved in this sector. 20 people are employed in the secondary sector and there are 6 businesses in this sector. 52 people are employed in the tertiary sector, with 11 businesses in this sector.

As of October 2009 the average unemployment rate was 0.5%. There were 46 businesses in the municipality of which 4 were involved in the secondary sector of the economy while 11 were involved in the third.

As of 2000 there were 111 residents who worked in the municipality, while 75 residents worked outside Stein and 33 people commuted into the municipality for work.

== Religion ==
From the 2000 census, 173 or 43.5% are Roman Catholic, while 187 or 47.0% belonged to the Swiss Reformed Church. Of the rest of the population, there is 1 individual who belongs to the Orthodox Church, and there are 25 individuals (or about 6.28% of the population) who belong to another Christian church. There are 2 (or about 0.50% of the population) who are Islamic. 9 (or about 2.26% of the population) belong to no church, are agnostic or atheist, and 1 individuals (or about 0.25% of the population) did not answer the question.
