= Silberplatten =

Mountain in Switzerland

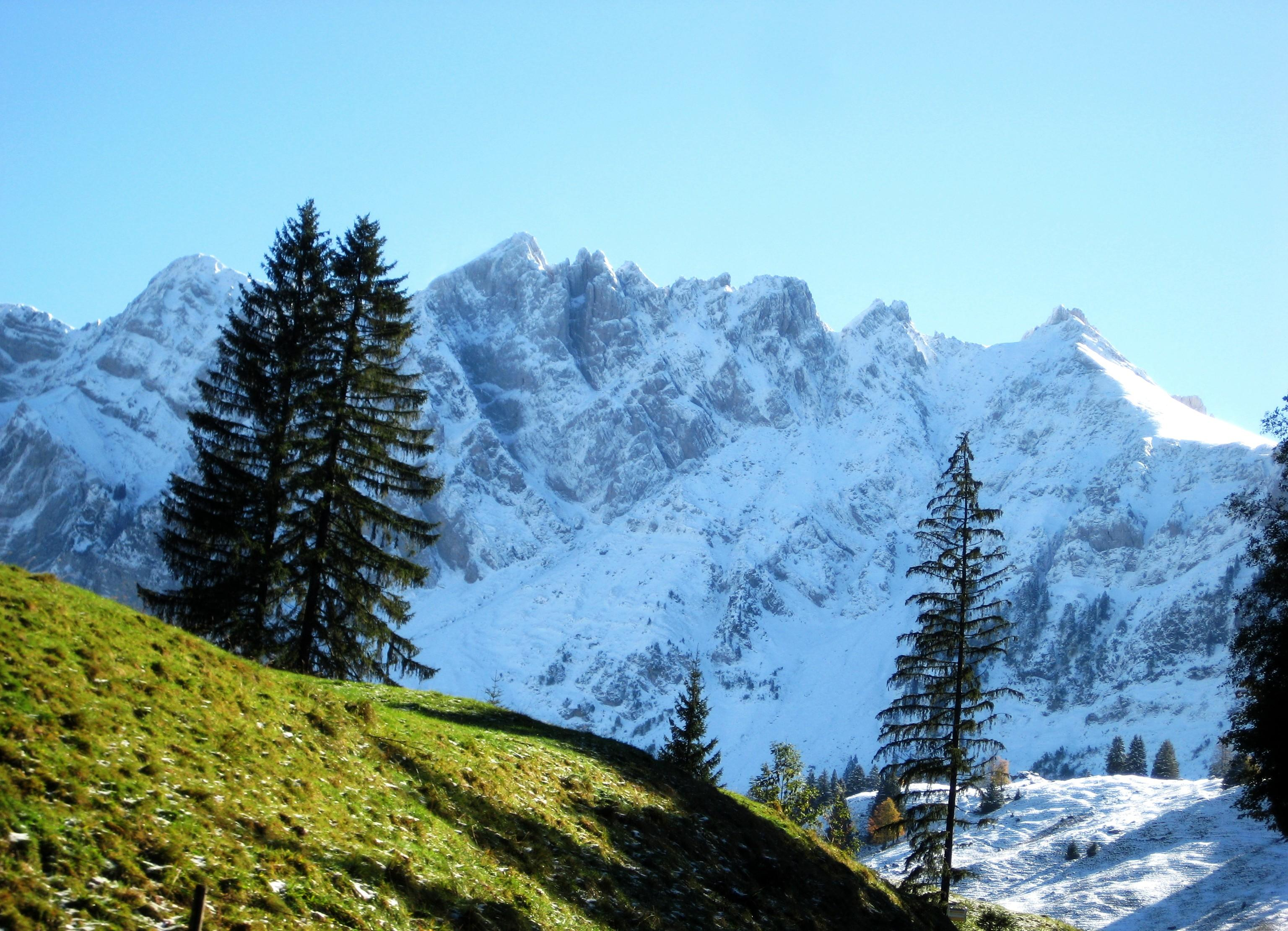
- The north-west side

Highest point
- Elevation: 2,158 m (7,080 ft)
- Prominence: 91 m (299 ft)
- Parent peak: Säntis
- Coordinates: 47°14′25″N 9°18′59.5″E

Geography
- Location within Switzerland Location within Canton of St. Gallen
- Location: St. Gallen, Switzerland
- Parent range: Appenzell Alps

The Silberplatten is a mountain of the Appenzell Alps (Alpstein massif), overlooking the Schwägalp Pass in the canton of St. Gallen. Its 2,158-metre-high (7,080 ft) summit is located southwest of the Grenzchopf, which marks the border with the canton of Appenzell Ausserrhoden.

== See also ==
- List of mountains of the canton of St. Gallen
