= Tweralpspitz =

Mountain in the Swiss Alps

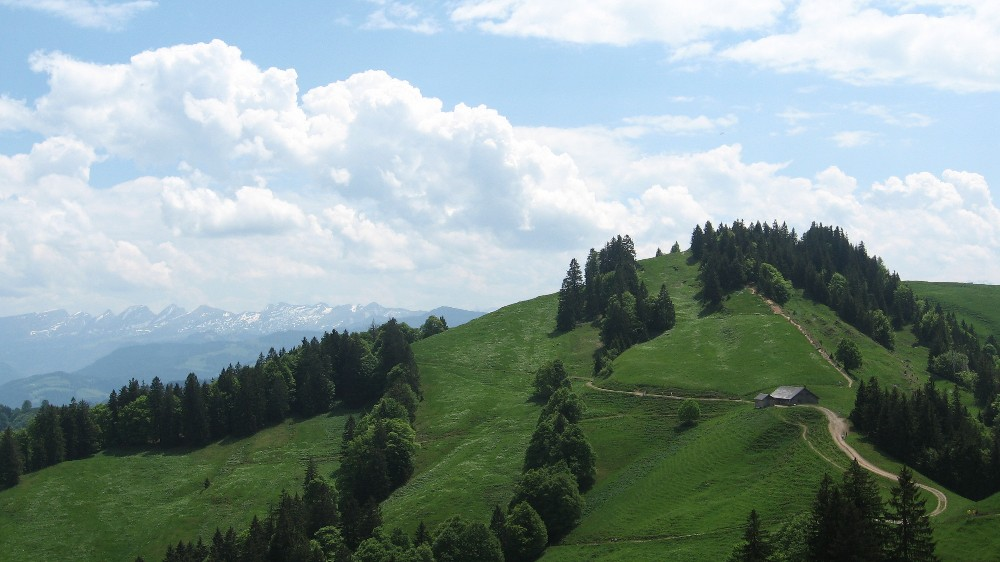
- View from the north with the Churfirsten in background

Highest point
- Elevation: 1,332 m (4,370 ft)
- Prominence: 542 m (1,778 ft)
- Parent peak: Säntis
- Coordinates: 47°17′27″N 9°01′34″E

Geography
- Location within Alps Location within Switzerland Location within Canton of St. Gallen
- Location: Canton of St. Gallen
- Country: Switzerland
- Parent range: Appenzell Alps

The Tweralpspitz is a mountain in the Appenzell Alps, located near Wattwil in the canton of St. Gallen. With an elevation of 1,332 metres (4,370 ft), it is the highest point of the chain situated north of Ricken Pass.

== See also ==
- List of mountains of the canton of St. Gallen
- Toggenburg
