= Marwees =

Mountain in Switzerland

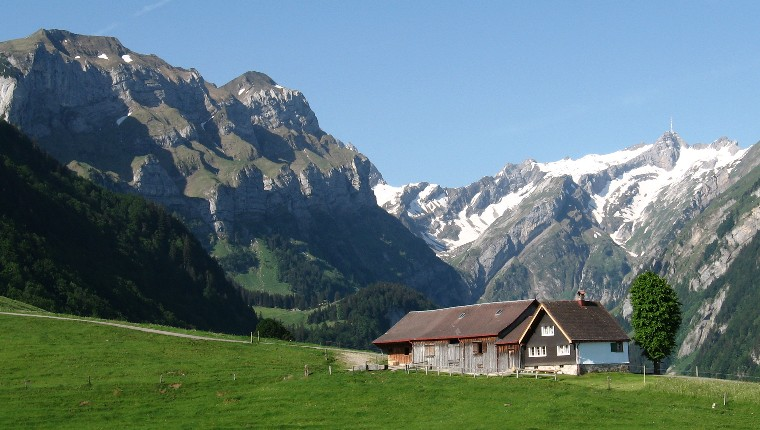
- Marwees (left) and Säntis (right)

Highest point
- Elevation: 2,056 m (6,745 ft)
- Prominence: 200 m (660 ft)
- Parent peak: Säntis
- Coordinates: 47°15′40.7″N 9°24′14.3″E

Geography
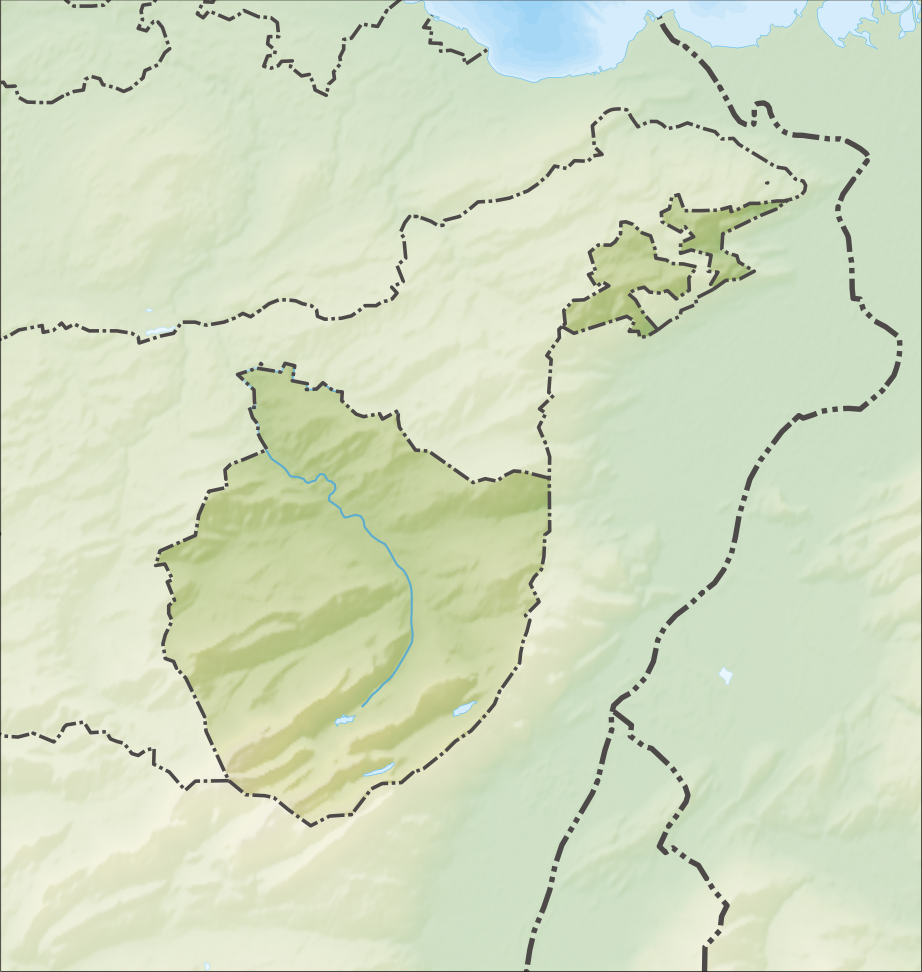
- Location within Switzerland Location within Canton of Appenzell Innerrhoden
- Location: Appenzell Innerrhoden
- Country: Switzerland
- Parent range: Appenzell Alps

The Marwees is a mountain in the Alpstein massif of the Appenzell Alps, located south of Schwende in the canton of Appenzell Innerrhoden. It lies on the range east of the Altmann, between the valleys of the Seealpsee and the Sämtisersee.

== See also ==
- List of mountains of Appenzell Innerrhoden
