= Furgglenfirst =

Mountain in Switzerland

- Hintere Hüser
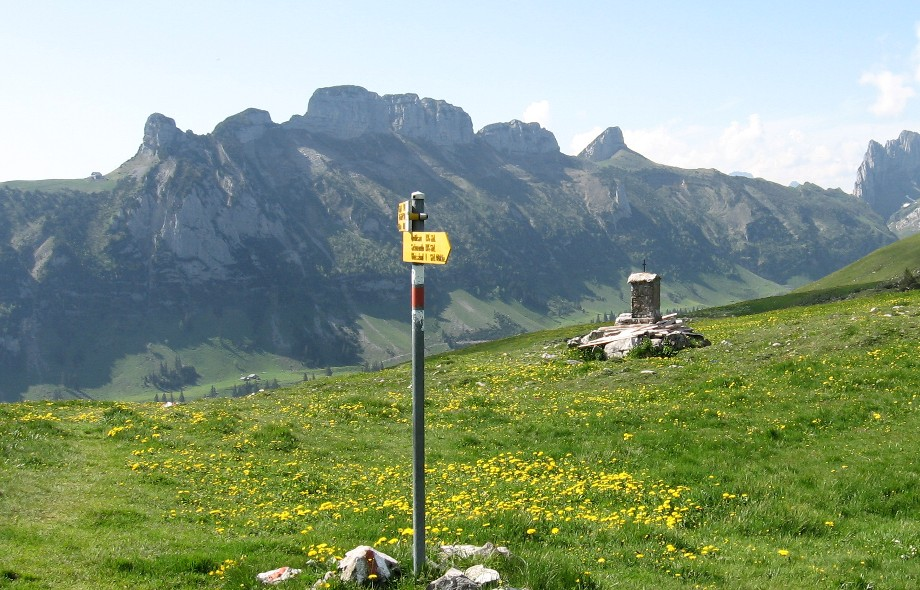
- View from the north side

Highest point
- Elevation: 1,951 m (6,401 ft)
- Prominence: 302 m (991 ft)
- Parent peak: Säntis
- Coordinates: 47°15′24″N 9°26′52″E

Geography
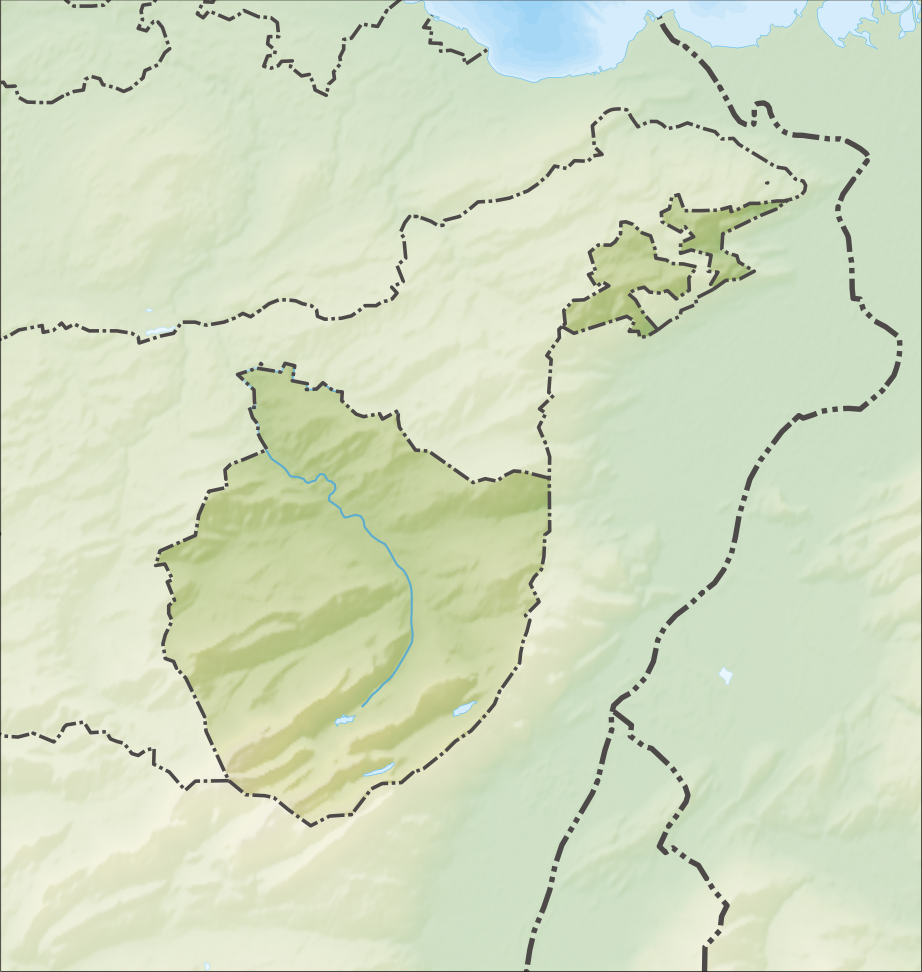
- Location within Switzerland Location within Canton of Appenzell Innerrhoden Location within Canton of St. Gallen
- Location: Appenzell Innerrhoden/St. Gallen
- Country: Switzerland
- Parent range: Appenzell Alps

The Furgglenfirst is a multi-summited mountain of the Alpstein massif of the Appenzell Alps located on the border between the Swiss cantons of Appenzell Innerrhoden and St. Gallen.

The main summit, named Hintere Hüser, has a height of 1,951 metres above sea level.

== See also ==
- List of mountains of Appenzell Innerrhoden
- List of mountains of the canton of St. Gallen
