= Maria Antonia Rass =

American businesswoman (1893–1980)

- Born: Maria Antonia Räss; June 19, 1893; Appenzell-Innerrhoden, Switzerland
- Died: 1980 (aged 86–87); Appenzell-Innerrhoden, Switzerland
- Citizenship: Swiss; American (since 1930)
- Occupations: Businesswoman, embroidery manufacturer, socialite
- Years active: 1921–1980

Maria Antonia Rass abbreviated as MAR (June 19, 1893 – 1980) was a Swiss-born American businesswoman, embroidery manufacturer and socialite who was primarily active in New York City. She was a muse of Walt Disney and an acquaintance of Coco Chanel and Eleanor Roosevelt.
