= Kamor =

Mountain in Switzerland

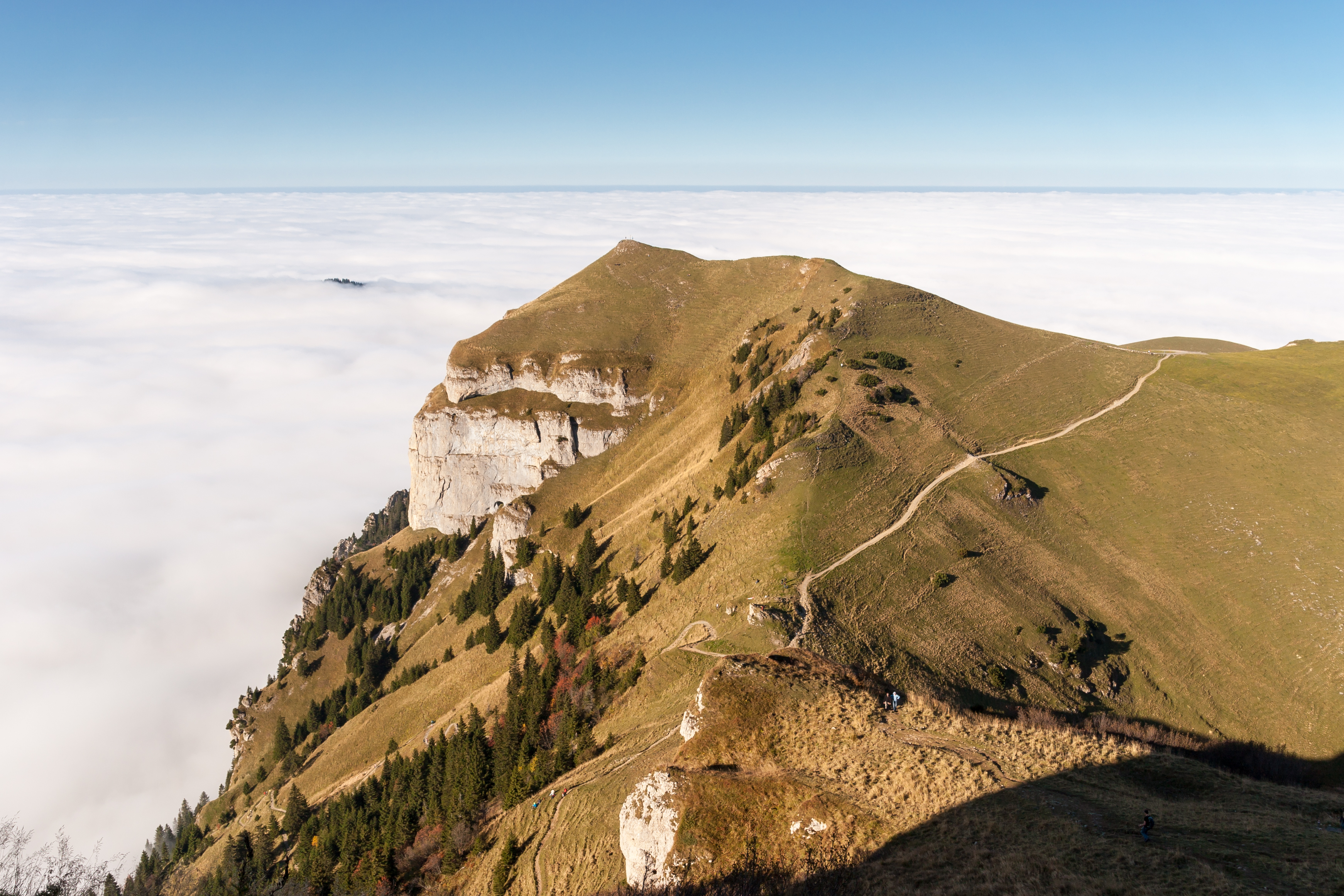
- Kamor seen from Hoher Kasten

Highest point
- Elevation: 1,751 m (5,745 ft)
- Prominence: 73 m (240 ft)
- Parent peak: Hoher Kasten
- Isolation: 0.6 km (0.37 mi)
- Coordinates: 47°17′23″N 9°29′12″E

Naming
- Pronunciation: Swiss German: [kxaˈmoːr]

Geography
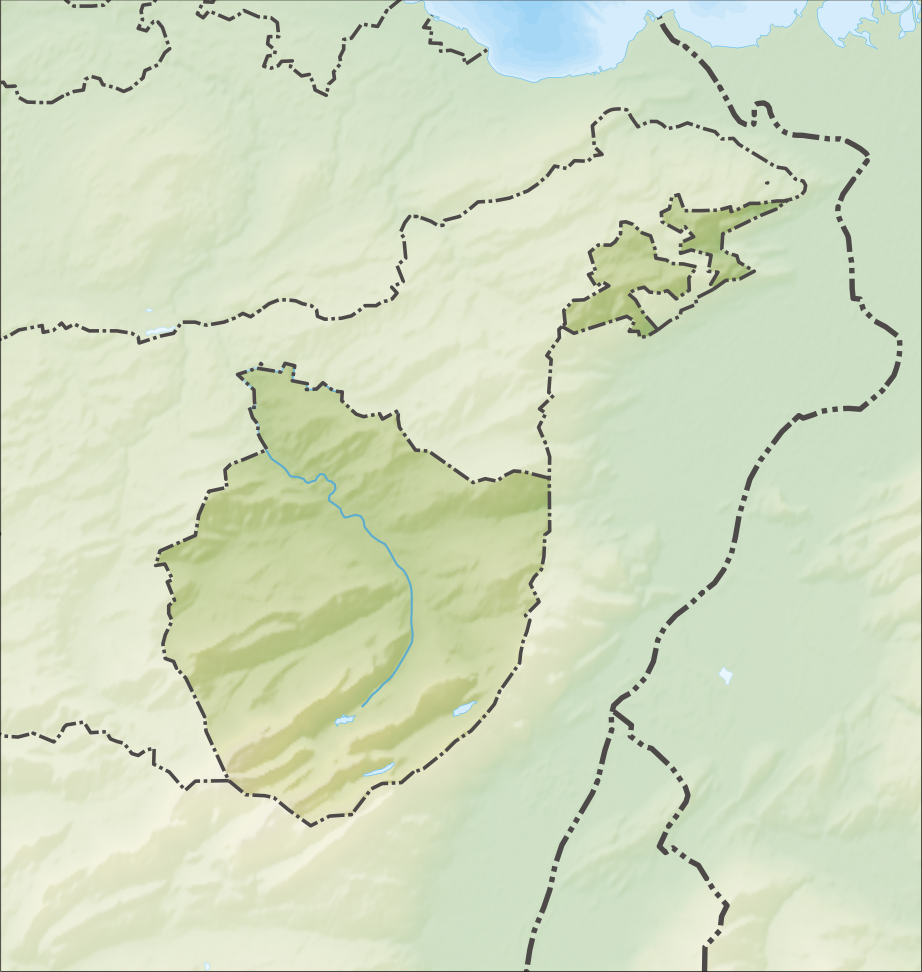
- Location within Switzerland Location within Canton of Appenzell Innerrhoden Location within Canton of St. Gallen Location within Alps
- Location: Appenzell Innerrhoden; St. Gallen
- Country: Switzerland
- Parent range: Appenzell Alps

The Kamor is a mountain in the Appenzell Alps and has an elevation of 1,751 m above the sea. It is part of a mountain belt of the Alpstein massif which forms the western boundary of the Alpine Rhine Valley and is located on the border of the Swiss cantons Appenzell Innerrhoden and Canton of St. Gallen.

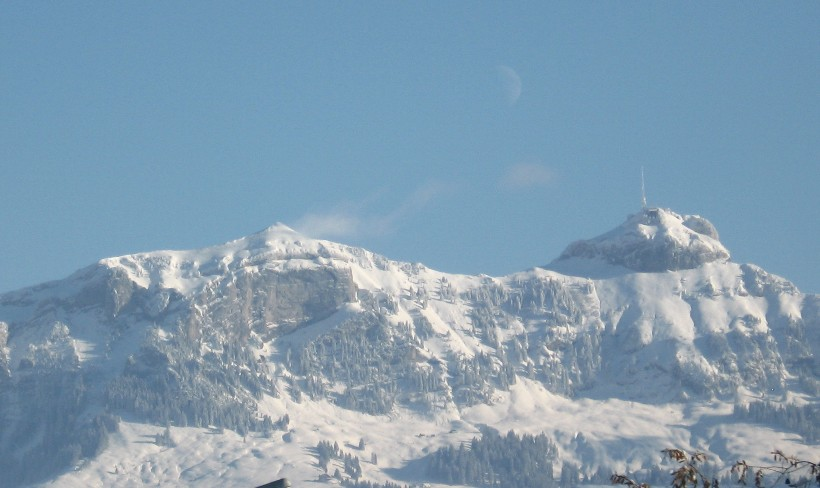
Kamor (left) and Hoher Kasten as seen from Appenzell

Less than one kilometre to the south is the Hoher Kasten, a 1,794 metres (5,886 ft) high mountain accessible via an aerial tramway from Brülisau. Both mountains are separated by the Kamorsattel, a 1,678 m (5,505 ft) high saddle, but connected by a hiking path.

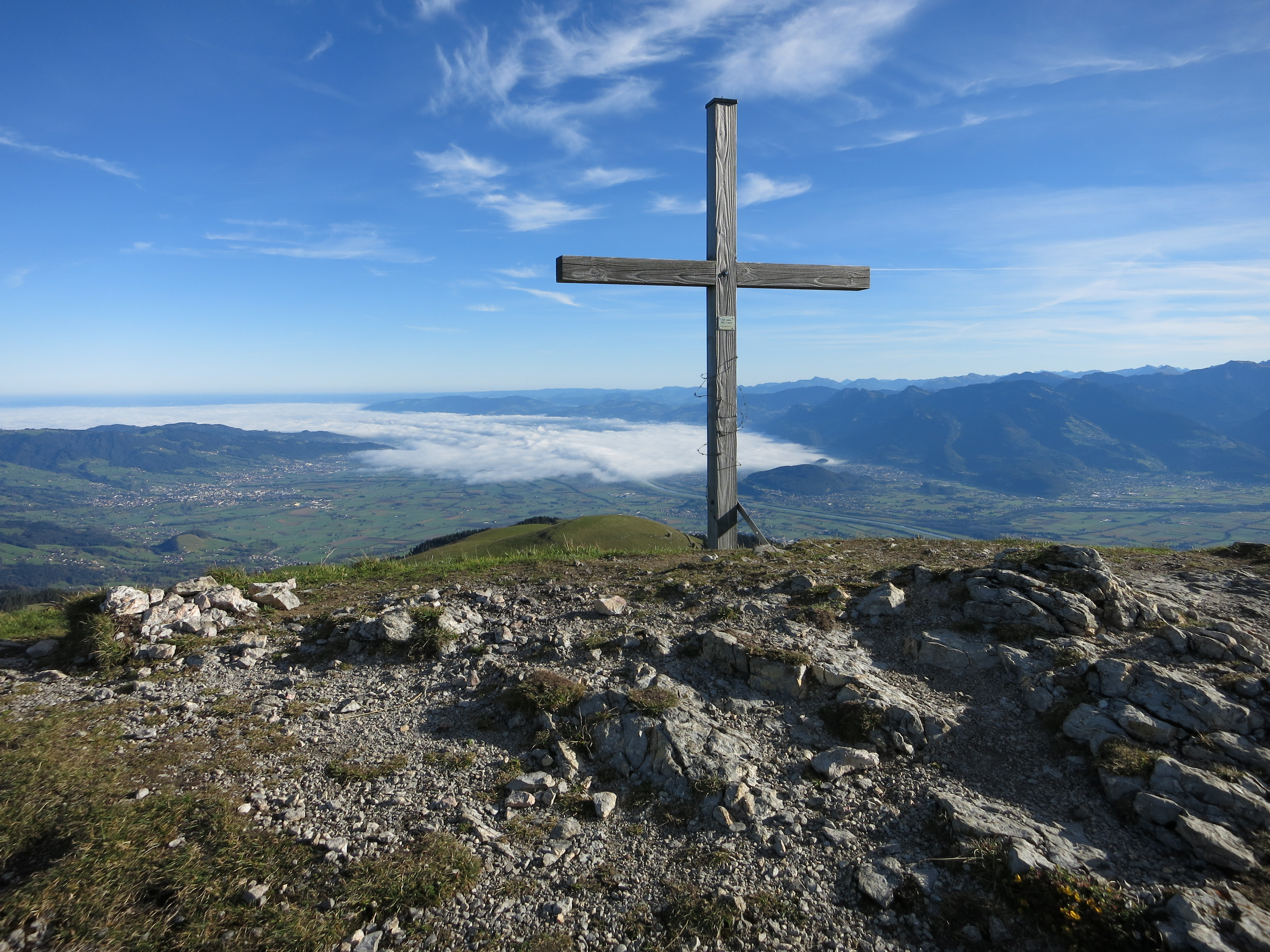
Summit cross and view direction Alpine Rhine and Lake Constance

On top of the Kamor is a wooden summit cross erected by the section Kamor of the Swiss Alpine Club.

Ascents to Kamor and Hoher Kasten were already described in the early 19th century.

== See also ==
- List of mountains of Appenzell Innerrhoden
- List of mountains of the canton of St. Gallen
