= List of mountains of Appenzell Innerrhoden =

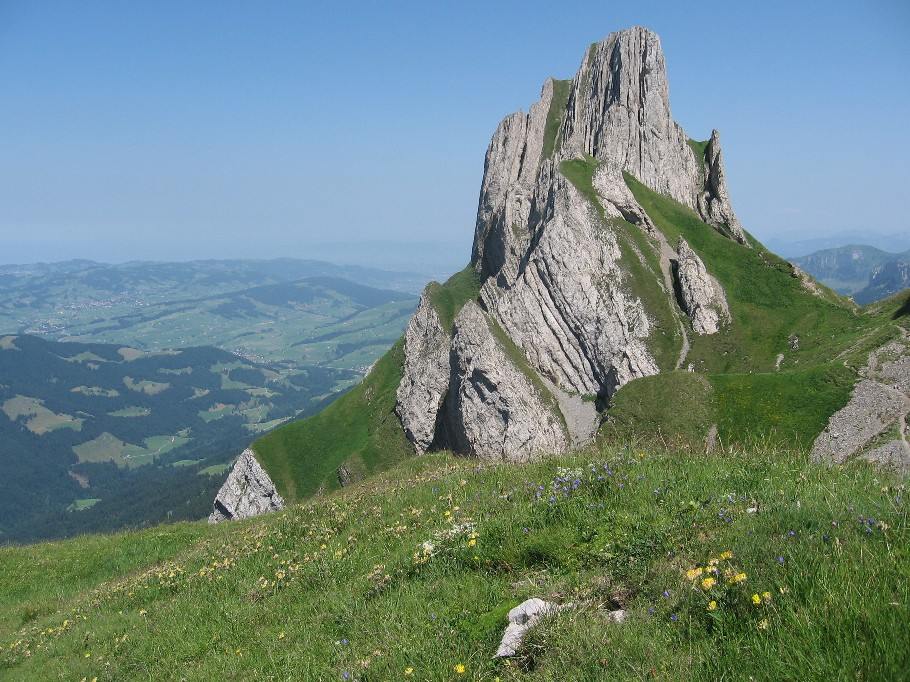
The Altenalp Türm, the northernmost summit above 2,000 metres (6,600 ft) in Switzerland

This is a list of mountains of the canton of Appenzell Innerrhoden in Eastern Switzerland. The canton is located in the Appenzell Alps. The Säntis, which marks the tripoint with the cantons of Appenzell Ausserrhoden, and St. Gallen, is the most elevated and most prominent mountain of Appenzell Innerrhoden. The canton's highest summits are all located in the Alpstein massif.

All mountain heights and prominences on the list are from the largest-scale maps available.

== Topographic prominence of 150 metres or more ==
This list only includes significant summits with a topographic prominence of at least 150 metres (492 ft).

Mountain	Height (m)	Drop (m)	Coordinates	Municipality/Municipalities	First ascent	Notes
Säntis	2502	2015	47°14′58″N 09°20′36″E	Schwende-Rüte	1680	Highest peak of the Alpstein. Summit is the tripoint of the borders with the cantons of Appenzell Ausserrhoden and St. Gallen (Toggenburg)
Altmann	2435	282	47°14′22″N 09°22′18″E	Schwende-Rüte		Peak of the Alpstein. Summit located on the border with the canton of St. Gallen (Toggenburg)
Hundstein	2157	162	47°15′10″N 09°24′07″E	Schwende-Rüte		Peak of the Alpstein
Marwees	2056	200	47°15′40.7″N 9°24′14.3″E	Schwende-Rüte		Peak of the Alpstein
Furgglenfirst	1951	302	47°15′24″N 09°26′25″E	Schwende-Rüte		Peak of the Alpstein. Summit located on the border with the canton of St. Gallen (Werdenberg)
Hoher Kasten	1791	251	47°17′0.8″N 09°29′7.4″E	Schwende-Rüte		Peak of the Alpstein. Summit located on the border with the canton of St. Gallen (Rheintal)
Kronberg	1663	351	47°17′29″N 09°19′46″E	Gonten/Schwende-Rüte		
Hundwiler Höhi	1306	406	47°20′27″N 09°20′00″E	Gonten		Summit located on the border with the canton of Appenzell Ausserrhoden (Hundwil)

== Topographic prominence of less than 150 metres ==
Mountain	Height (m)	Drop (m)	Coordinates	Municipality/Municipalities	First ascent	Notes
Altenalp Türm	2033	133	47°16′15″N 09°22′43″E	Schwende-Rüte		Peak of the Alpstein
Kamor	1751	73	47°17′23″N 09°29′12″E	Schwende-Rüte		Peak of the Alpstein. Summit located on the border with the canton of St. Gallen (Rheintal)
Ebenalp	1640	41	47°17′03″N 09°24′39″E	Schwende-Rüte		Peak of the Alpstein. Contains the Wildkirchli caves

== See also ==
- List of mountains of Switzerland
- Swiss Alps
