= Hoher Kasten =

Mountain in Switzerland

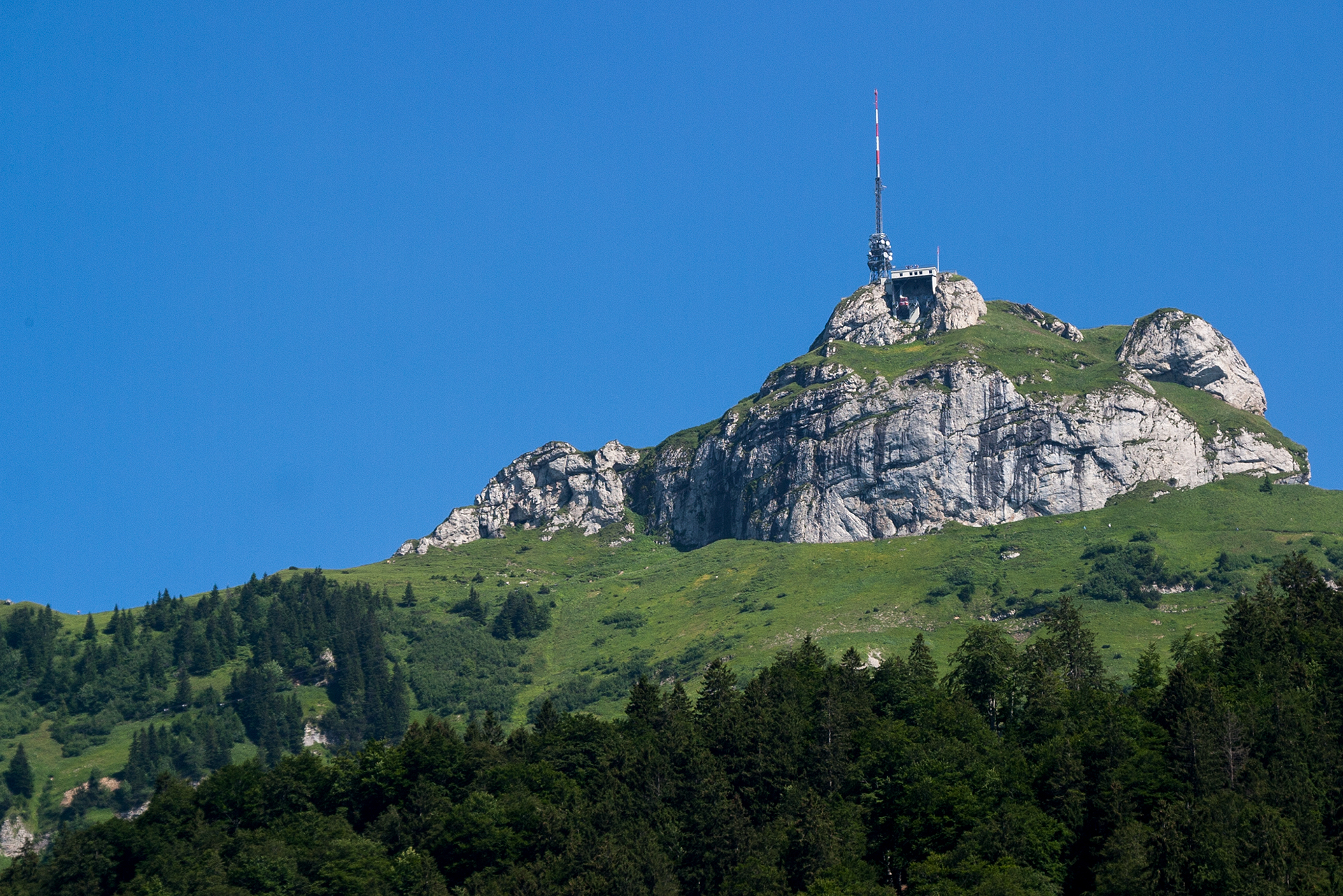
- View from Brüllisau

Highest point
- Elevation: 1,791 m (5,876 ft)
- Prominence: 251 m (823 ft)
- Parent peak: Säntis
- Coordinates: 47°17′0.8″N 9°29′7.4″E

Geography
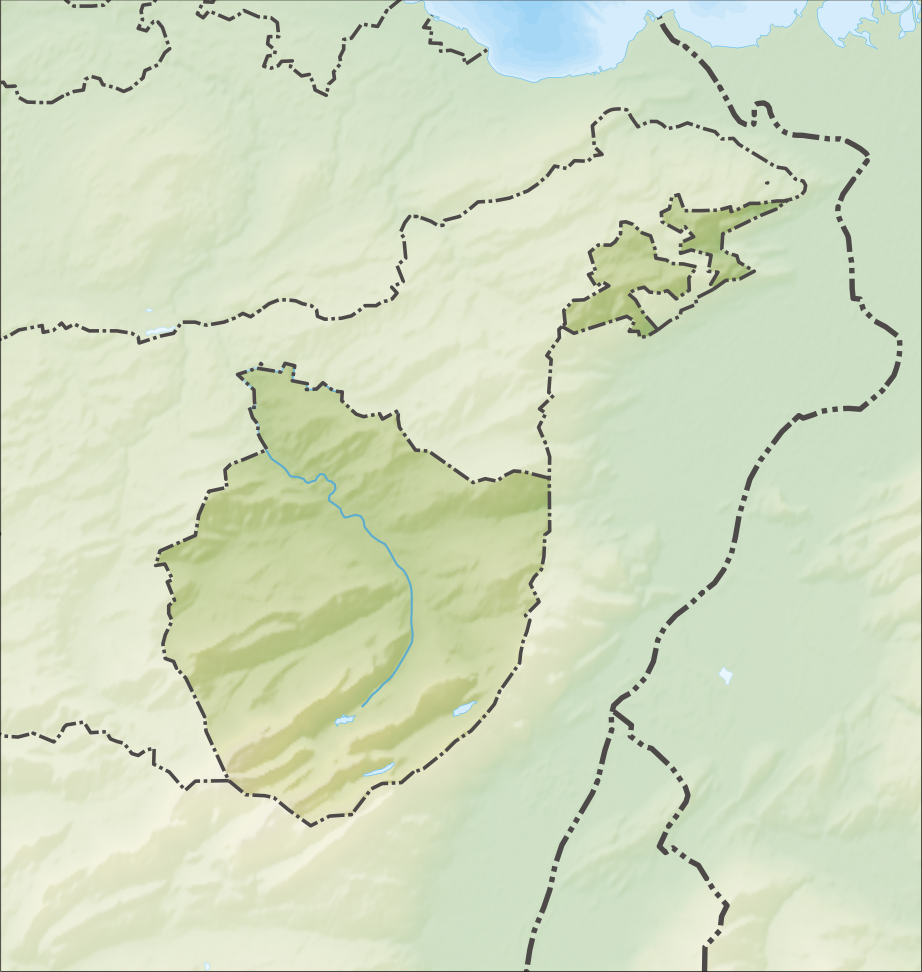
- Location within Alps Location within Switzerland Location within Canton of Appenzell Innerrhoden Location within Canton of St. Gallen
- Location: Cantons of Appenzell Innerrhoden and St. Gallen; Switzerland
- Parent range: Appenzell Alps

Climbing
- Easiest route: Aerial tramway

The Hoher Kasten is a mountain in the Appenzell Alps in Eastern Switzerland, overlooking the Alpine Rhine Valley, which forms the Austria–Switzerland and Liechtenstein–Switzerland borders. It is located on the border between the cantons of Appenzell Innerrhoden and St. Gallen. A revolving restaurant, offering panoramic views, has been built on the top.

Ascents to Hoher Kasten and the neighbouring summit Kamor were already described in the early 19th century.

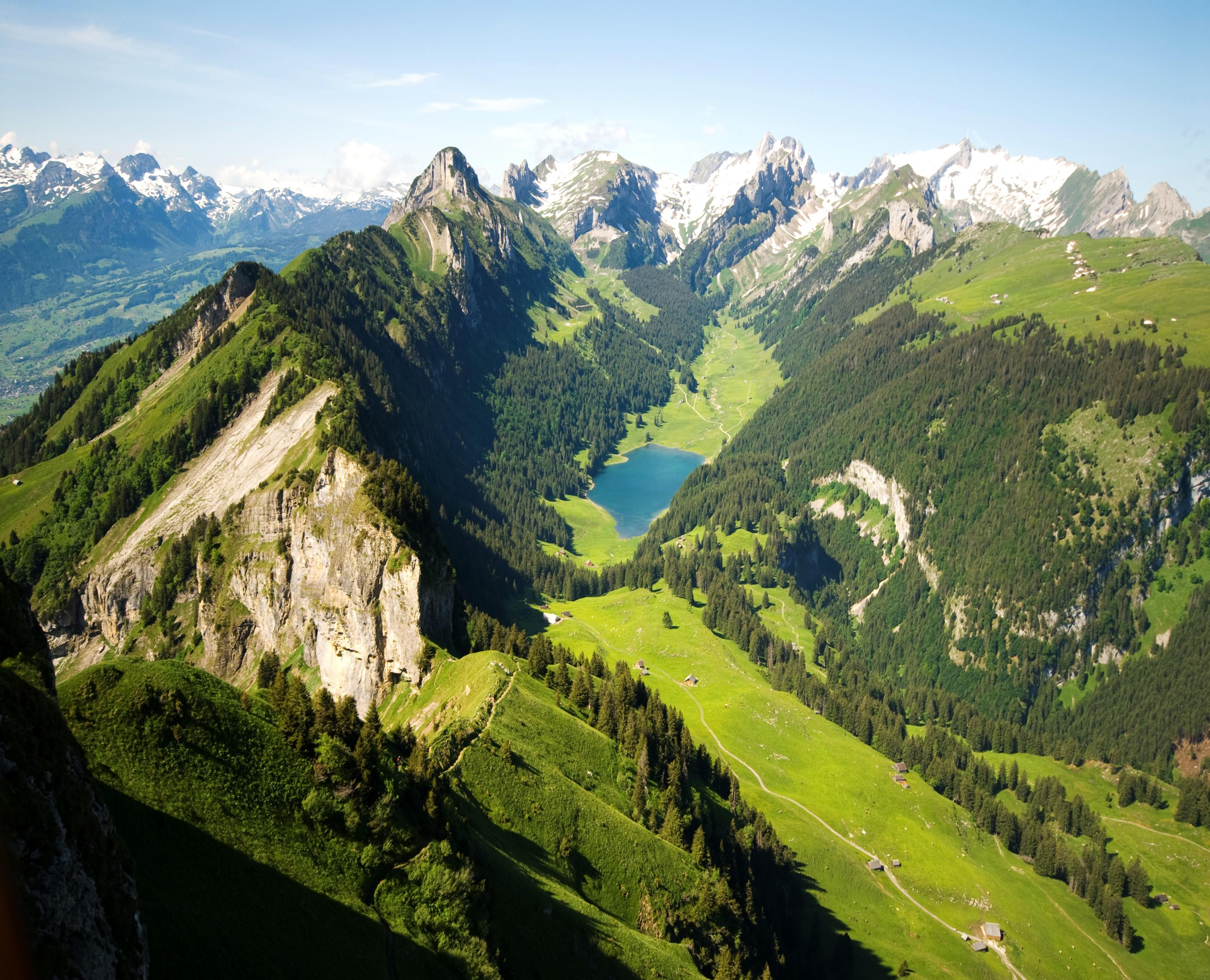
View of Alpstein and Sämtisersee from the Hoher Kasten

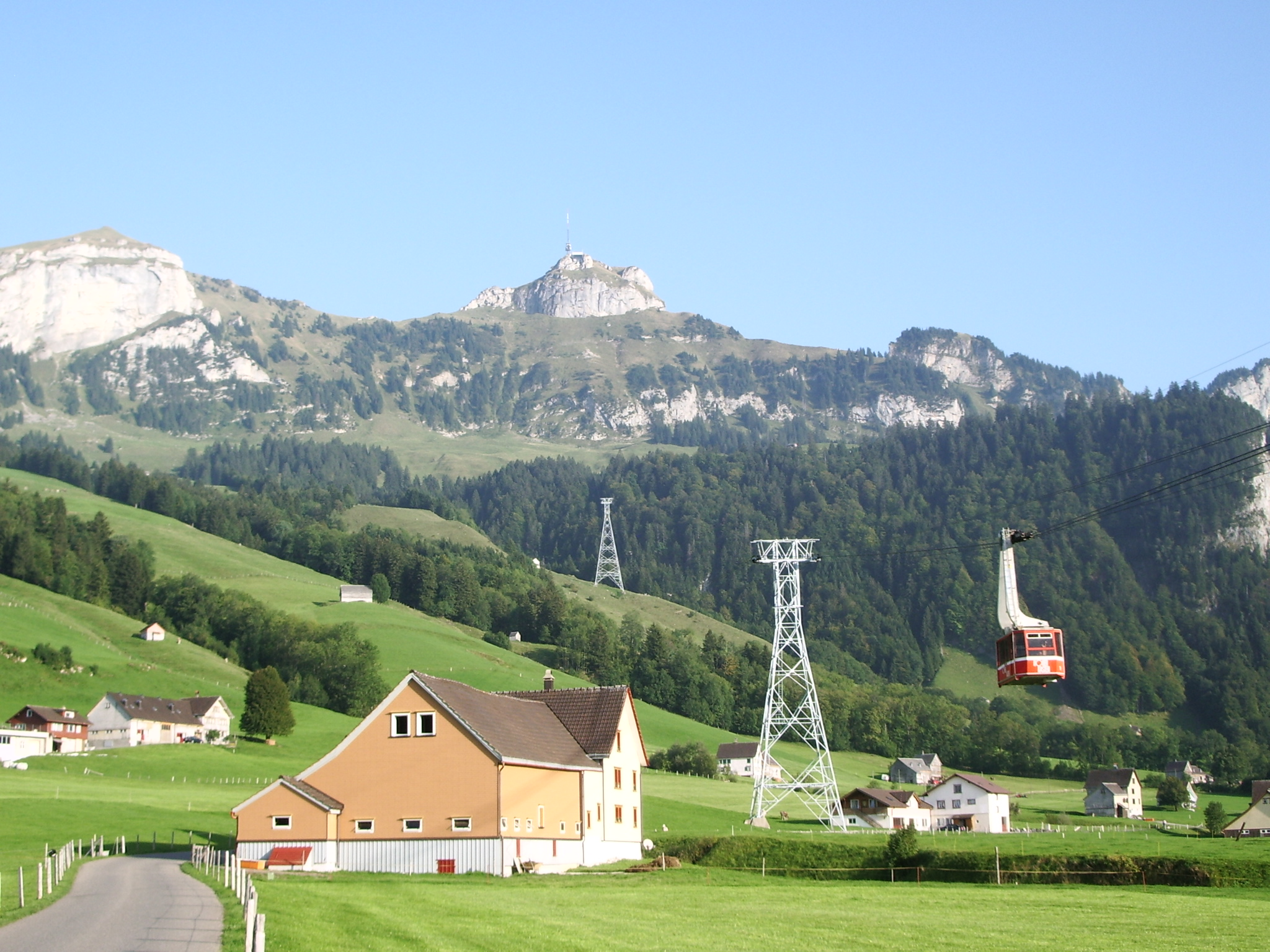
Aerial tram Brüllisau–HoherKasten

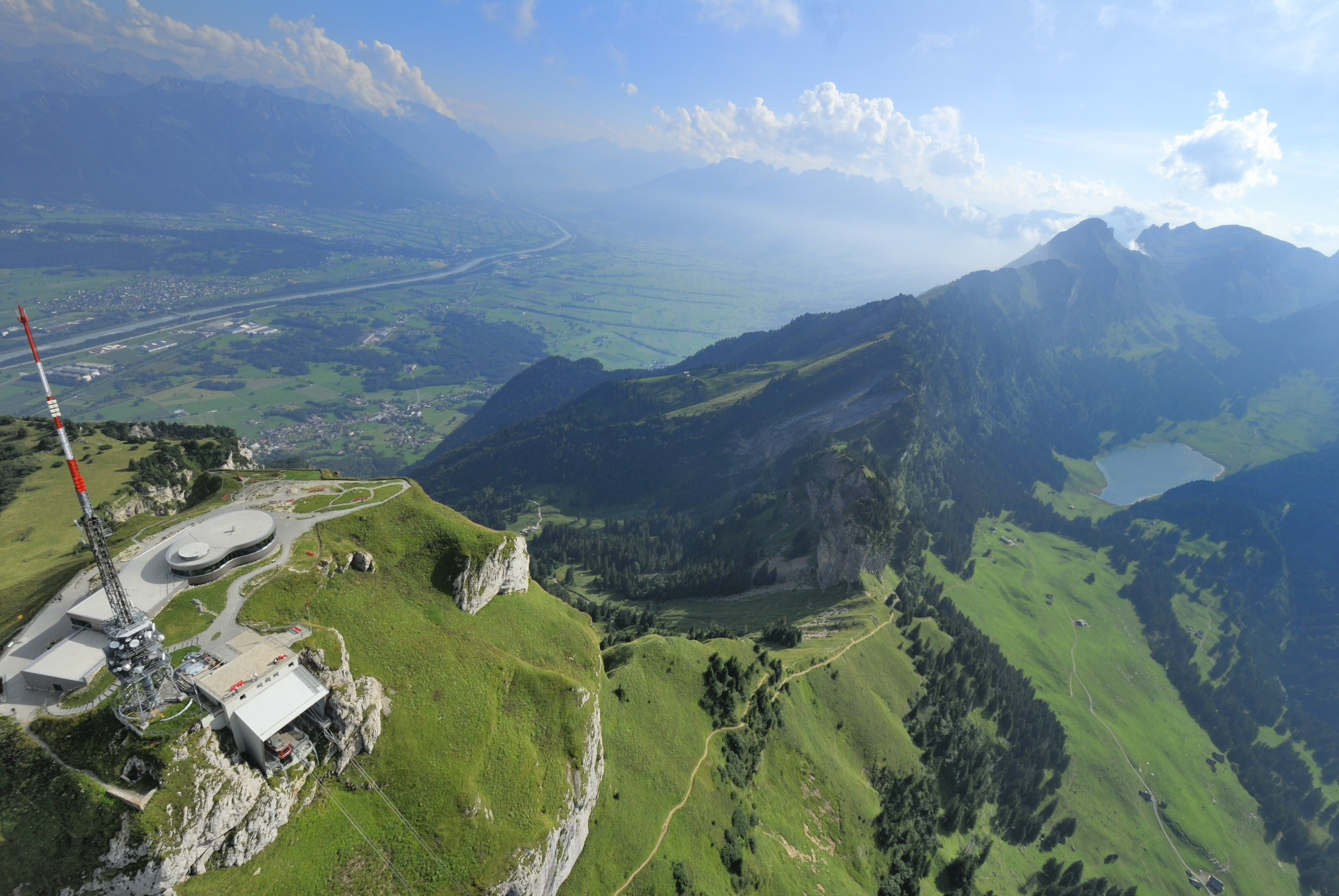
View of Alpine Rhine from Hoher Kasten

== Transport ==
The summit is easily accessible with a cable car (Kastenbahn) starting at Brülisau, south of the village of Appenzell. The valley station is connected by a Postauto bus line to Weissbad railway station, which is served by the S23 service of St. Gallen S-Bahn to Gossau SG via Herisau, which are both served by long-distance trains.

== See also ==
- List of mountains of Switzerland accessible by public transport
- List of mountains of Appenzell Innerrhoden
- List of mountains of the canton of St. Gallen
