= Alpstein =

Mountain range in Switzerland

Coordinates: 47°15′N 9°20′E

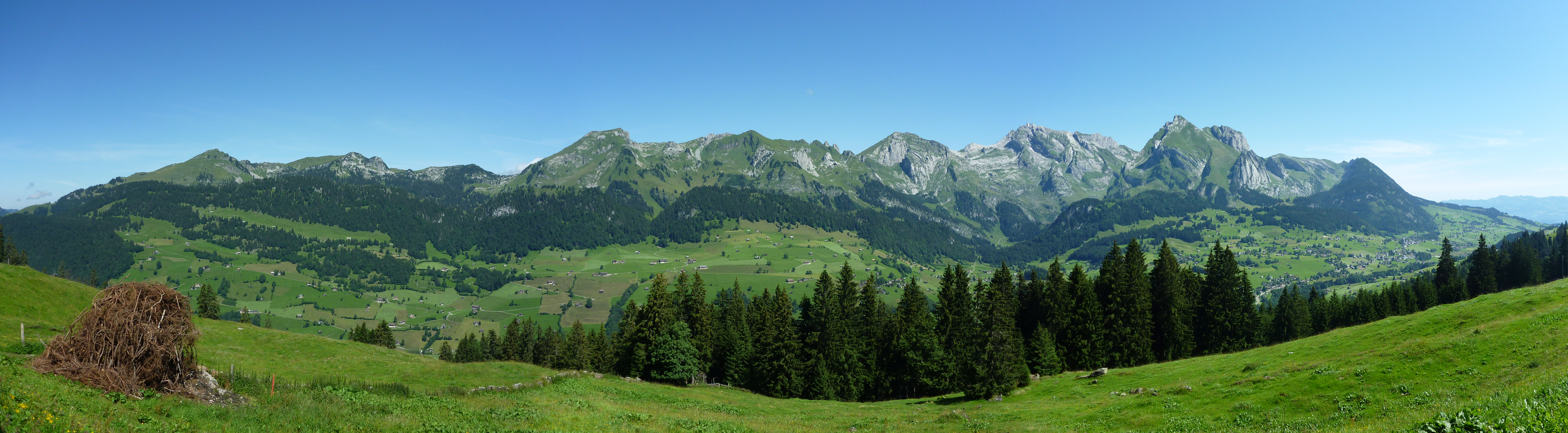
- A view of the Alpstein from the south (Toggenburg)

Highest point
- Peak: Säntis (2,501.9 m (8,208 ft))

Geography
- Location within Alps Location within Switzerland
- Country: Switzerland
- Regions: Appenzell Ausserrhoden; Appenzell Innerrhoden; St. Gallen
- Parent range: Appenzell Alps

Geology
- Orogeny: Tertiary
- Rock age: Mesozoic
- Rock type: Sedimentary

The Alpstein are a subgroup of the Appenzell Alps in Eastern Switzerland. The Alpstein massif is located south of the village of Appenzell and extends across the cantons of Appenzell Innerrhoden, Appenzell Ausserrhoden and St. Gallen. It is a popular tourist site.

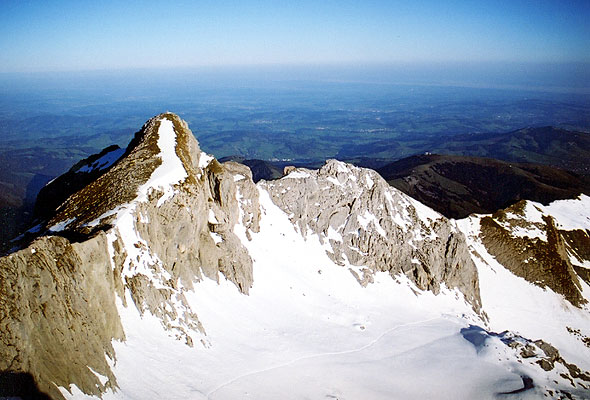
View from Säntis to Girenspitz (2,448 m [8,031 ft]) and Lake Constance (Bodensee)

Despite it being rather low when compared to other Alpine peaks – the highest mountain is the Säntis at 2,501.9 metres (8,208 ft) – the Alpstein, due to their northern "outpost" position only a short distance from Lake Constance (nearly 30 km (19 mi) away) are relatively tall when compared to the surrounding area. The range also includes the Altenalp Türm as the northernmost summit above 2,000 metres (6,600 ft) in Switzerland.

== Description ==
Geologically, the Alpstein massif is different from the predominantly granitic central Alps. The Alpstein are predominantly a limestone massif and thus represent a kind of western continuation of the eastern ranges, running between the Bavarian Alps (Germany) and the Austrian Alps.

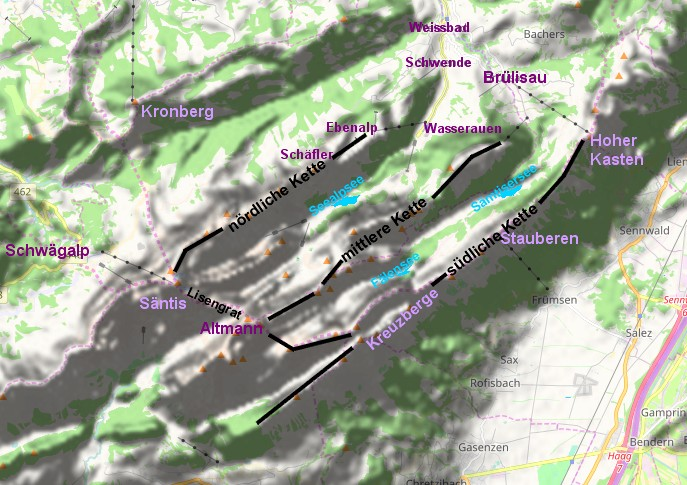
Relief of the Alpstein

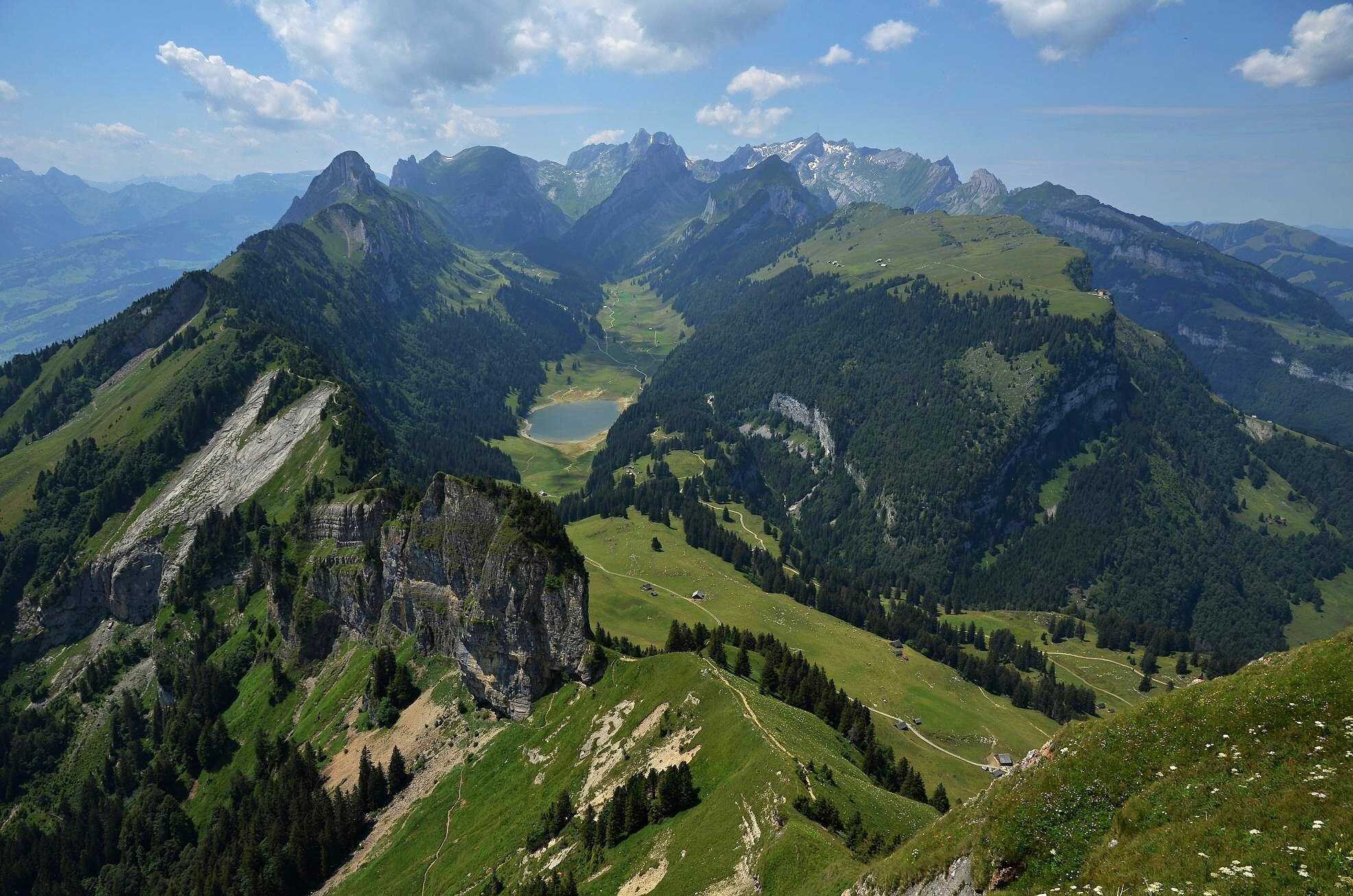
Southern (left), middle and northern (right) mountain chains (as seen from Hoher Kasten)

Morphologically, there are three main tectonic folds running from southwest to northeast. The main peaks and mountains of the northern chain are (from west to east): Silberplatten, Grenzchopf, Säntis, Altenalp Türm, Schäfler and Ebenalp (known for the Äscher hut and Wildkirchli caves). The Altmann is the main peak of the middle chain, which also includes the Wildhuser Schafberg, Hundstein, Marwees and Alp Sigel, while the southern chain is marked by the Kreuzberge, Saxer Lücke, Furgglenfirst, Staubern, Hoher Kasten and Kamor. Only the Lisengrat, the connection between the two peaks of Säntis and Altmann runs perpendicular to the main ridges.

There are three lakes. The Seealpsee is located between the northern and middle chain, while the Fälensee and Sämtisersee lie in the valley between the middle and southern chain. Because of erosion, numerous cracks, caves and sinkholes which prevail in the limestone, two of the three lakes have no surface drainage: the water of the Fälensee flows by the mountain ridge southwest into the Alpine Rhine

The Churfirsten are the mountain range to the south of the Alpstein, while the Kronberg is located north of it. To the west of the Alpstein is the Stockberg, while east of it is the Alpine Rhine Valley.

== Transport ==
There are several cable cars to elevated points in the Alpstein massif, for example:

- Aerial tram to Säntis from Schwägalp Pass
- Aerial tram to Ebenalp from Wasserauen
- Aerial tram to Alp Sigel from Brülisau
- Aerial tram to Hoher Kasten from Brülisau
- Aerial tram to Staubern from Frümsen
- Gondola lift to Gamplüt from Wildhaus

The valley stations of these cable cars are served by PostAuto buses or have nearby railway stations served by Appenzell Railways.

== See also ==
- List of mountains of Appenzell Ausserrhoden
- List of mountains of Appenzell Innerrhoden
- List of mountains of the canton of St. Gallen
