= Altenalp Türm =

Mountain in Switzerland

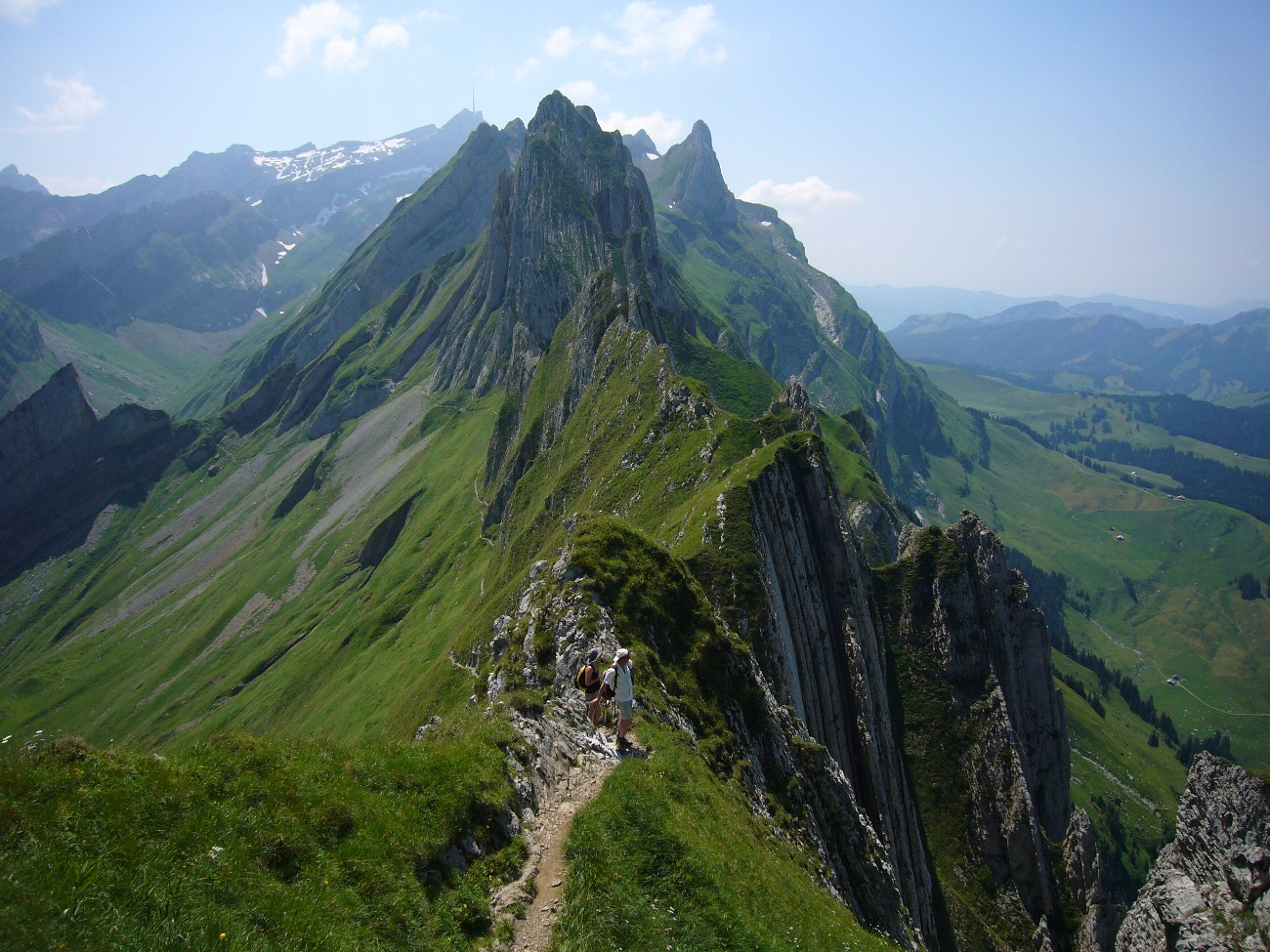
- The Altenalp Türm and the Säntis behind

Highest point
- Elevation: 2,033 m (6,670 ft)
- Prominence: 133 m (436 ft)
- Parent peak: Säntis
- Coordinates: 47°16′15″N 9°22′43″E

Geography
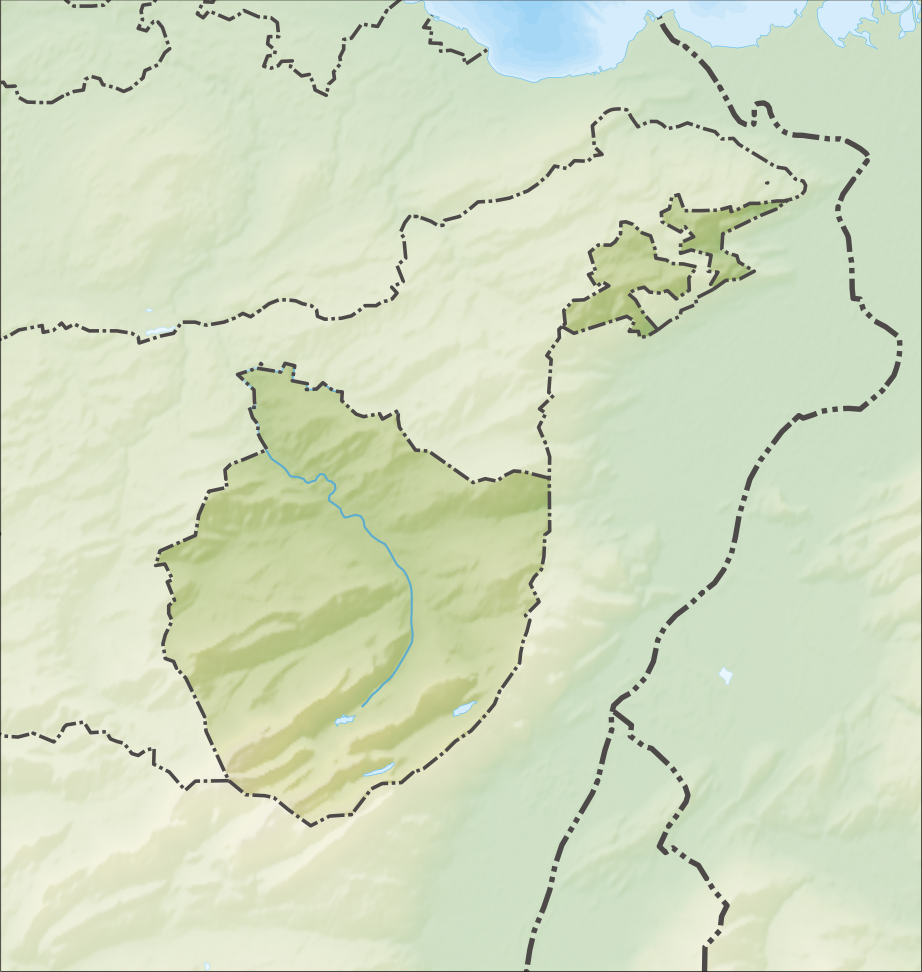
- Location within Switzerland Location within Canton of Appenzell Innerrhoden
- Location: Appenzell Innerrhoden
- Country: Switzerland
- Parent range: Appenzell Alps

The Altenalp Türm (2,033 m [6,670 ft]) is a peak of the Alpstein massif (Appenzell Alps), located in the canton of Appenzell Innerrhoden, on the ridge between Ebenalp and the Säntis. It is the northernmost peak rising above 2,000 metres (6,600 ft) in Switzerland.

== See also ==
- List of mountains of Appenzell Innerrhoden
