= Feuerschaugemeinde =

Special-purpose municipality in Appenzell, Switzerland

Coordinates: 47°18′N 9°24′E

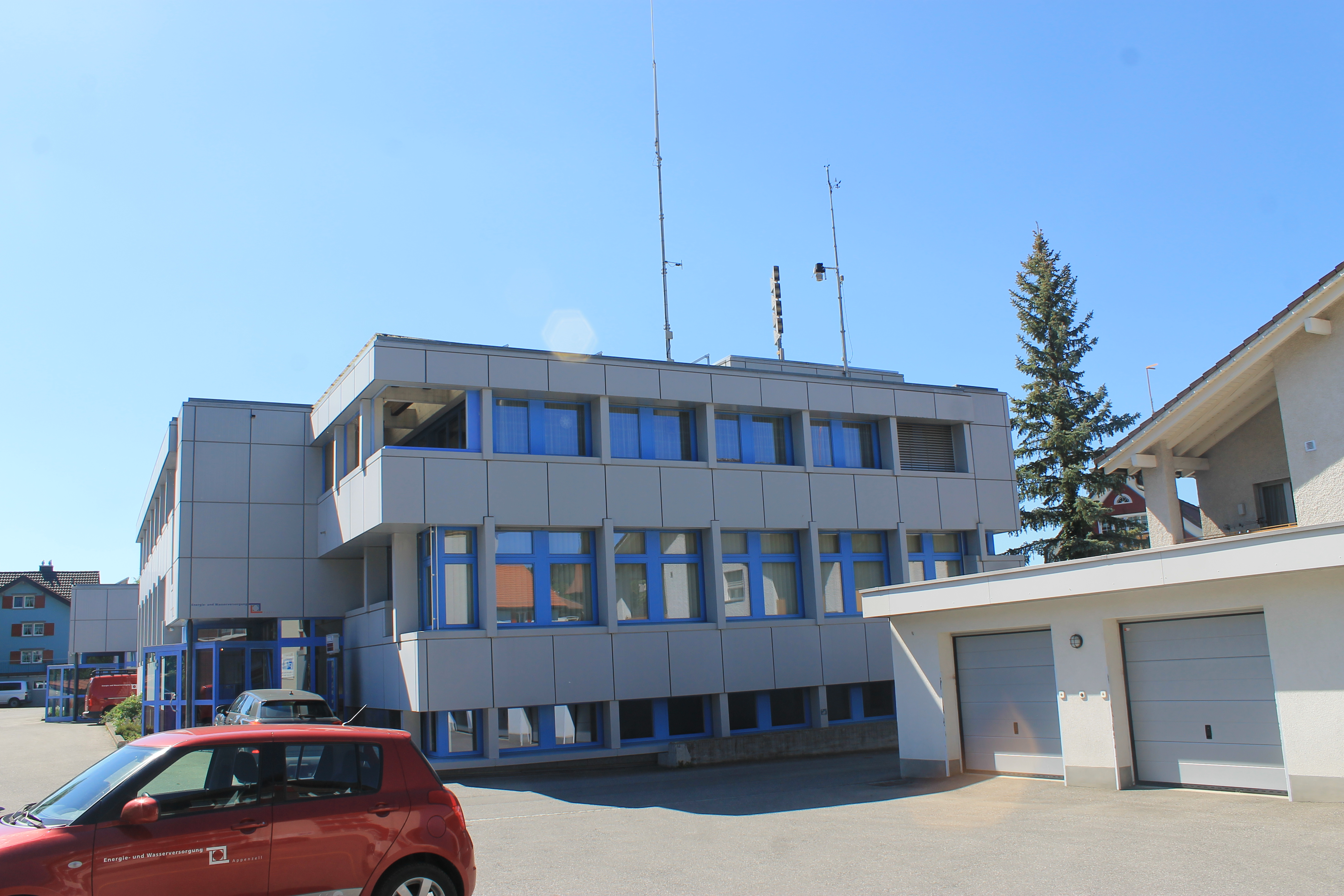
Municipal administration of the Feuerschaugemeinde in Appenzell.

The Feuerschaugemeinde is a special-purpose municipality for firefighting as well as managing energy and water utilities in the town of Appenzell, capital of the canton of Appenzell Innerrhoden in Switzerland. The special-purpose municipality exists because utilities would usually be handled by districts, but the town of Appenzell is divided among two districts (Appenzell and Schwende-Rüte), so creating a single entity outside of the district system is more efficient.

The Feuerschaugemeinde first generated electricity in 1905, at the hydroelectric plant at Seealpsee-Wasserauen.
