= Sämtisersee =

Lake in Appenzell Innerrhoden, Switzerland

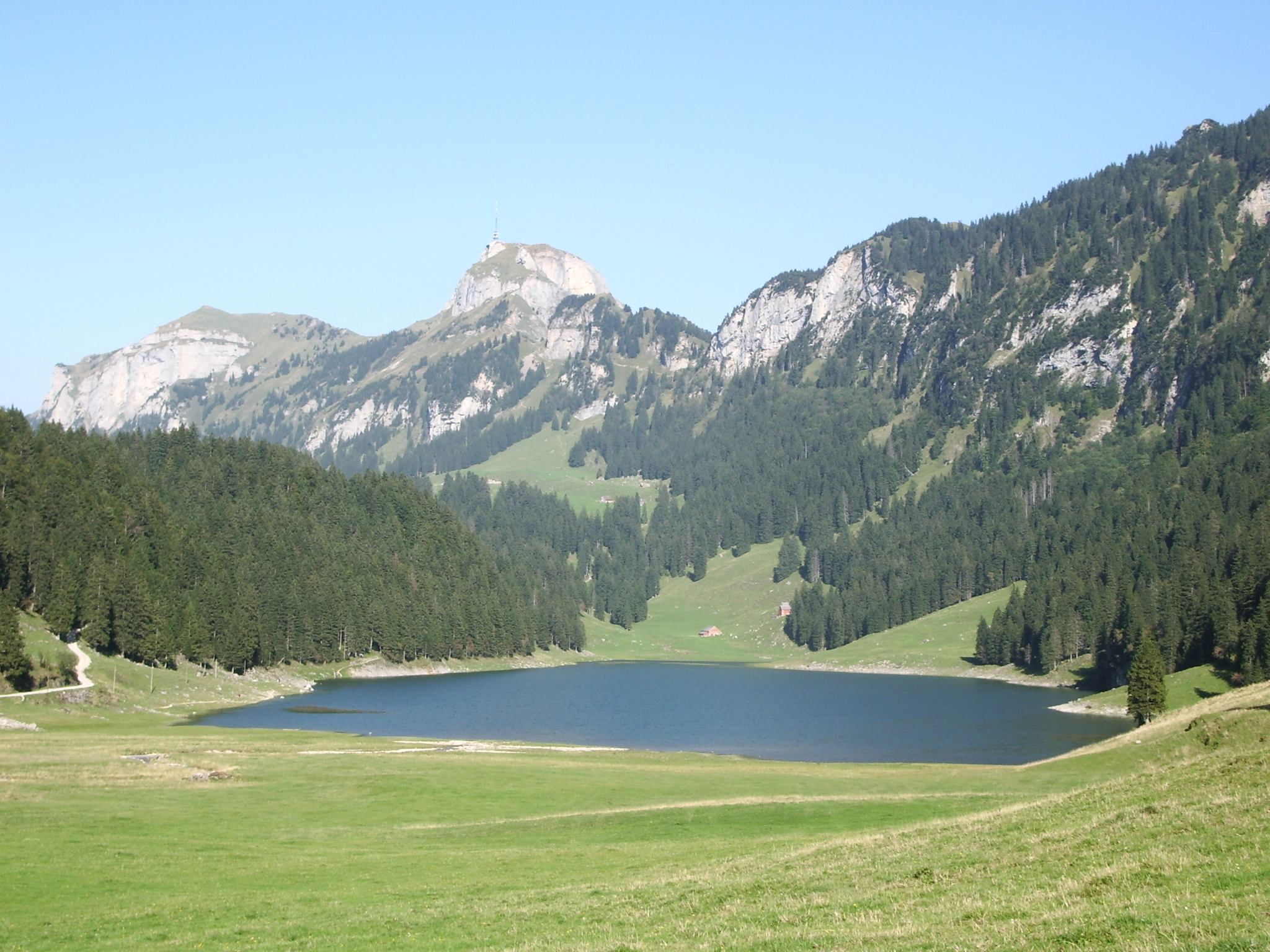
- The lake with Hoher Kasten in the background

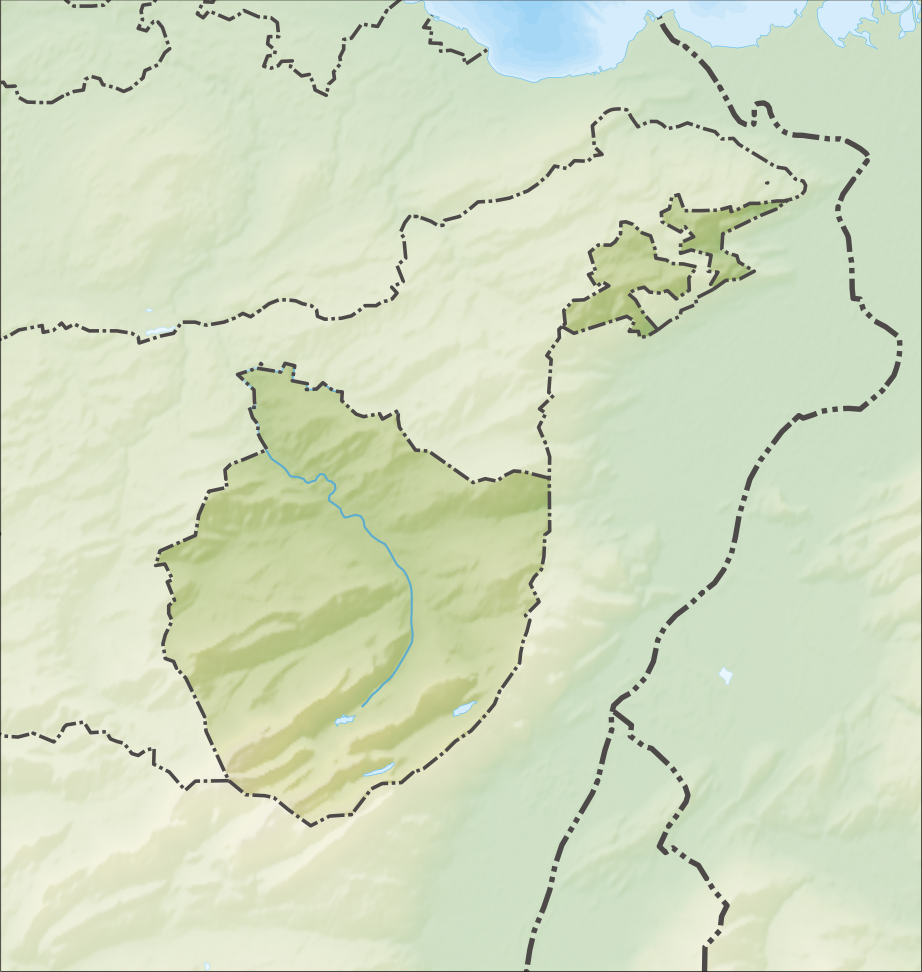
- Location within Canton of Appenzell Innerrhoden Location within Switzerland Location within Alps
- Interactive map of Sämtisersee
- Location: Appenzell Innerrhoden
- Coordinates: 47°16′18″N 9°27′28″E
- Basin countries: Switzerland
- Surface area: 13 ha (32 acres)
- Surface elevation: 1,209 m (3,967 ft)

Sämtisersee is a lake in the Alpstein range of the canton of Appenzell Innerrhoden, Switzerland. At an elevation of 1209 m, the surface area is 13 ha (32 acres). It is located below Hoher Kasten not far from Fälensee.

== See also ==
- List of mountain lakes of Switzerland
