= Theresia Rohner =

Swiss human rights activist (born 1954)

- Born: 1954 (age 71–72); Herisau, Appenzell Ausserrhoden, Switzerland
- Occupations: Women's rights activist Potter; Craniosacral therapist
- Years active: 1989–1991
- Known for: Campaigning for women's suffrage in Appenzell Innerrhoden

Theresia Rohner Mattmüller (born 1954) is a Swiss human rights activist. Following the 1971 Swiss women's suffrage referendum, which gave women the right to vote in national elections, Rohner campaigned for women to be granted voting rights for cantonal issues in Appenzell Innerrhoden, where it was illegal for women to vote until 1991.

== Context ==
Women's suffrage in Switzerland was first introduced in 1959, when Vaud and Neuchâtel granted women the right to vote in local elections. By the time a national referendum was held in 1971, women's suffrage had been introduced in Geneva, Basel, Basel-Stadt, Ticino, Valais, and Zurich. While the referendum was held to vote on granting women the right to vote in national elections, many cantons gave the right for women to vote in local matters at the same time, with the notable exception of Appenzell Ausserrhoden and Appenzell Innerrhoden. In 1989, a narrow majority of voters at Appenzell Ausserrhoden's Landsgemeinde voted in favour of women's suffrage, leaving Appenzell Innerrhoden as the only canton in Switzerland where women could not vote on local issues, having voted against it in 1973 and 1982.

== Activism ==
Rohner was born in Herisau in Appenzell Ausserrhoden. She owned a pottery workshop in Appenzell, a village in Appenzell Innerrhoden, where she lived with her husband and their two daughters. Unhappy with the Landsgemeinde of Appenzell Innerrhoden's consistent refusal to legalise women's suffrage, on 5 April 1989 she contacted the Landsgemeinde to ask to participate in its next meeting, with the support of Hannelore Fuchs, a lawyer from St. Gallen. At that time, the Landsgemeinde comprised solely of men, none of whom supported her request to speak. It disputed her claims that the cantonal constitution granted women the right to vote, stating it only used the term Schweizer (lit. 'Swiss') As a result, Rohner appealed before the Federal Supreme Court of Switzerland in Lausanne. The Supreme Court delegated the decision back to Appenzell Innerrhoden. Due to Switzerland's direct democracy system, only eligible voters were able to vote on women's suffrage in the canton; as women were unable to vote, this meant that only men were able to decide on the matter. In April 1990, the local referendum rejected the proposal to grant women suffrage in Appenzell Innerrhoden, in a session that lasted 28 seconds.

Unhappy with the decision, Rohner paid for an advertisement in a local newspaper to find men and women in Appenzell Innerrhoden who supported women's suffrage. She found 100 individuals (53 women and 49 men) who joined her in filing an appeal with the Federal Supreme Court against the outcomes of the 1990 referendum. Due to the public profile of her campaign, Rohner faced hostility and anonymous threats, and required police protection for a time after stones were thrown through her shop's windows.

On 27 November 1990, the Federal Supreme Court unanimously ruled in its Frauenstimmrecht-Entscheid (lit. 'Women's suffrage decision') that the ban on women's suffrage in Appenzell Innerrhoden violated the Swiss Federal Constitution, which had implemented an equality article in 1980, and that women were entitled to have cantonal voting rights. While Swiss and international press celebrated the result, the response in Appenzell Innerrhoden was more negative, with public attacks against Rohner and other women who took part in the campaign; Rohner's shop was boycotted and police had to accompany her to her first Landsgemeinde meeting. Women first voted in Appenzell Innerrhoden in April 1991, when they represented around a third of participating voters.

Following the campaign, Rohner largely withdrew from public life, though she gave an interview in 2017 to discuss her experiences. She lives in Interlaken in the Canton of Bern, where she works as a craniosacral therapist.
