= Altmann (mountain) =

Mountain in Switzerland

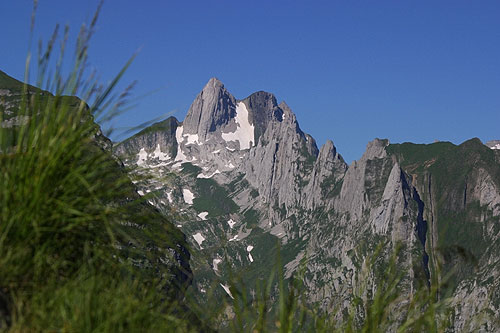
- The east side

Highest point
- Elevation: 2,435 m (7,989 ft)
- Prominence: 313 m (1,027 ft)
- Parent peak: Säntis
- Coordinates: 47°14′22.4″N 9°22′18.4″E

Geography
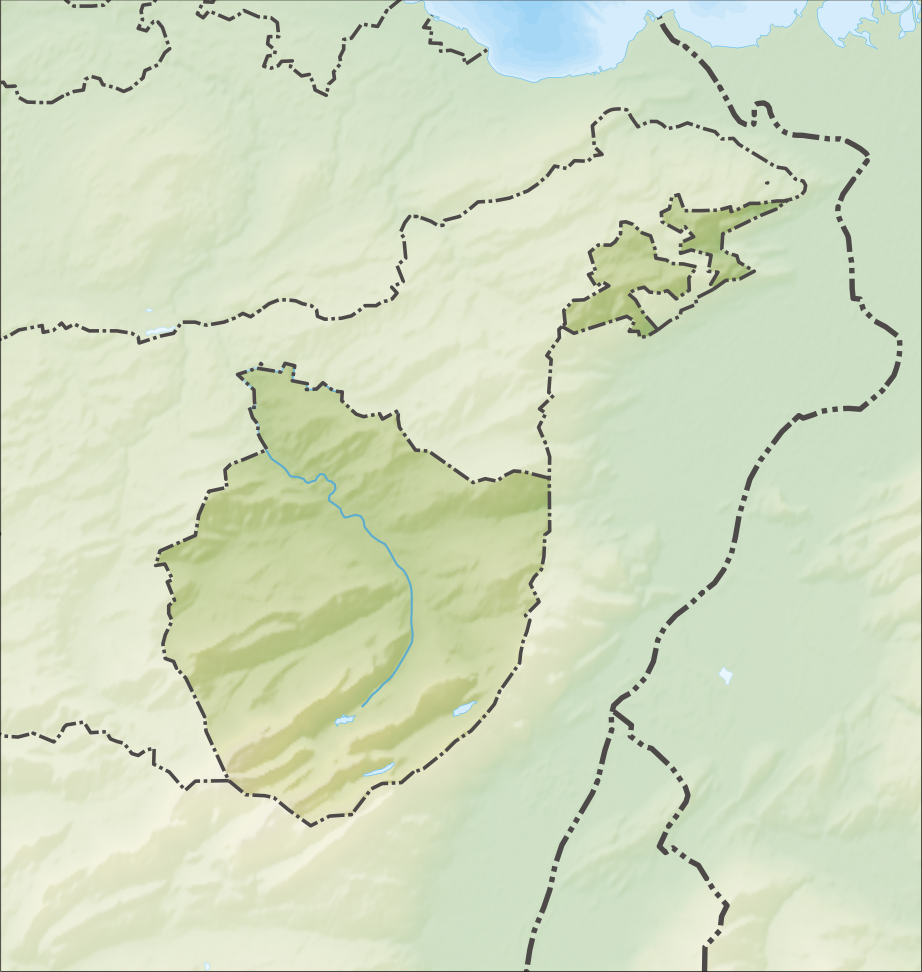
- Location within Switzerland Location within Canton of Appenzell Innerrhoden Location within Canton of St. Gallen
- Location: Appenzell Innerrhoden/St. Gallen
- Country: Switzerland
- Parent range: Appenzell Alps

The Altmann is a mountain in the Appenzell Alps, located on the border between the cantons of Appenzell Innerrhoden and St. Gallen, Switzerland. It is part of the Alpstein massif, situated north of Wildhaus (St. Gallen) and a few kilometres from the Säntis.

The Altmann is a steep limestone tower, which rises about 1,000 metres (3,300 ft) over the valleys of the Alpstein. The normal route to Altmann starts at Rotstein Pass (Rotsteinpass) at 2,120 metres (6,960 ft) on the north-west side and is considered an easy climb.

== See also ==
- List of mountains of Appenzell Innerrhoden
- List of mountains of the canton of St. Gallen
