= Appenzell (village) =

Village in Appenzell Innerrhoden, Switzerland

- Municipality
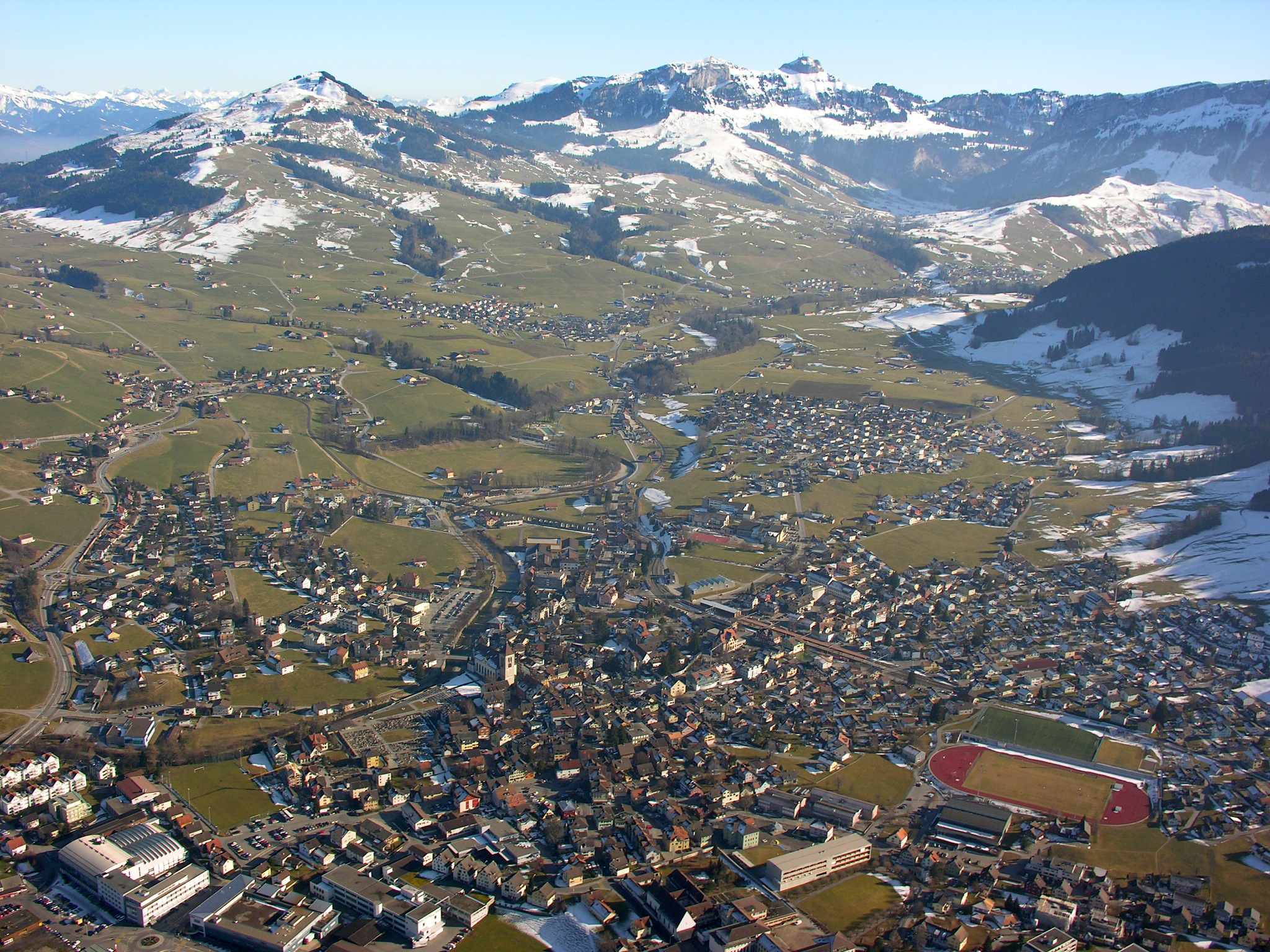
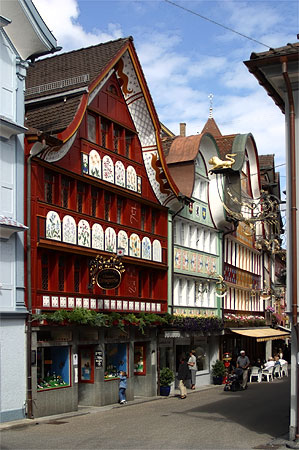
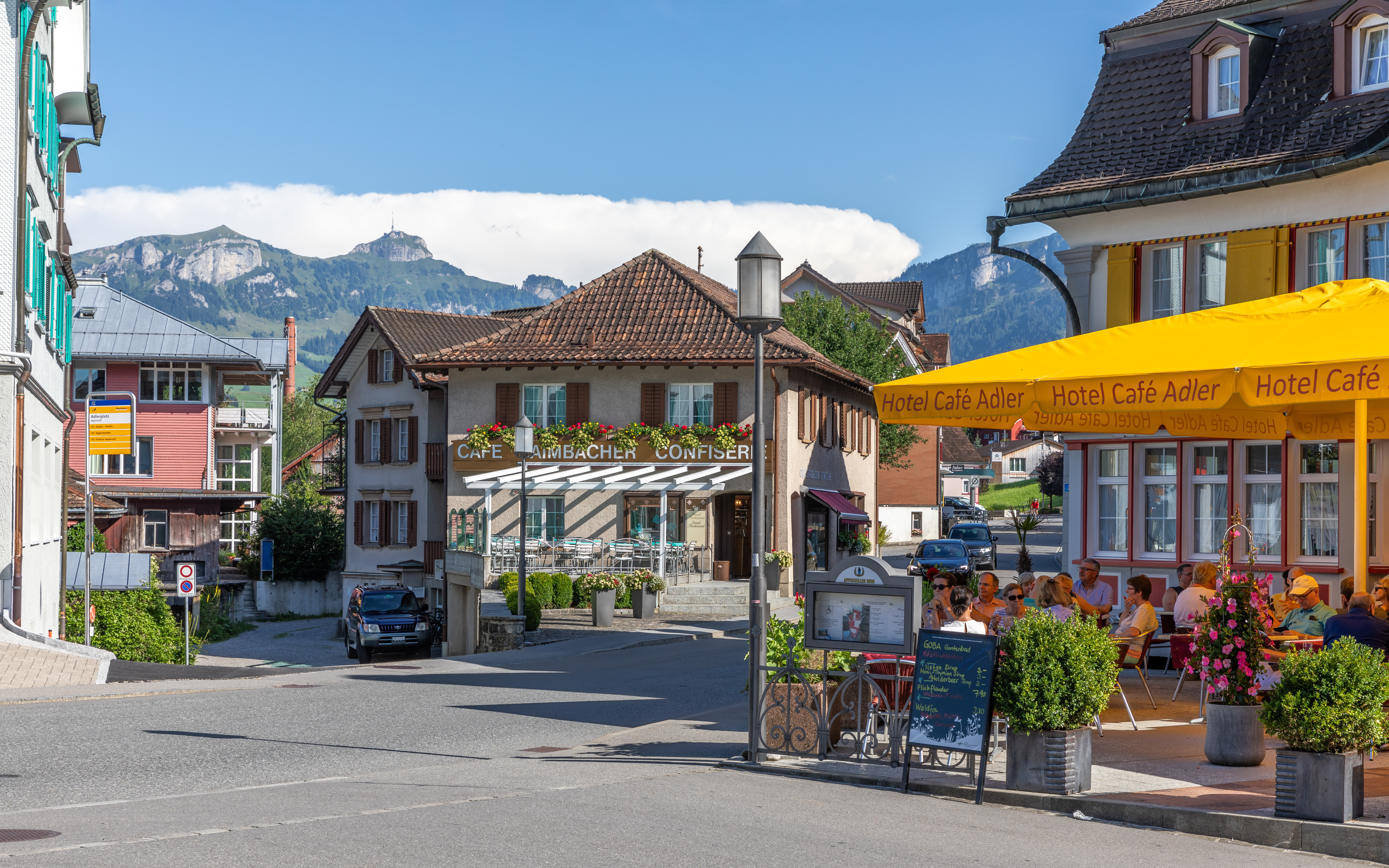
- Clockwise from top: Aerial view of Appenzell, Adlerplatz, Hauptgasse with traditional houses

- Flag Coat of arms
- Location of Appenzell
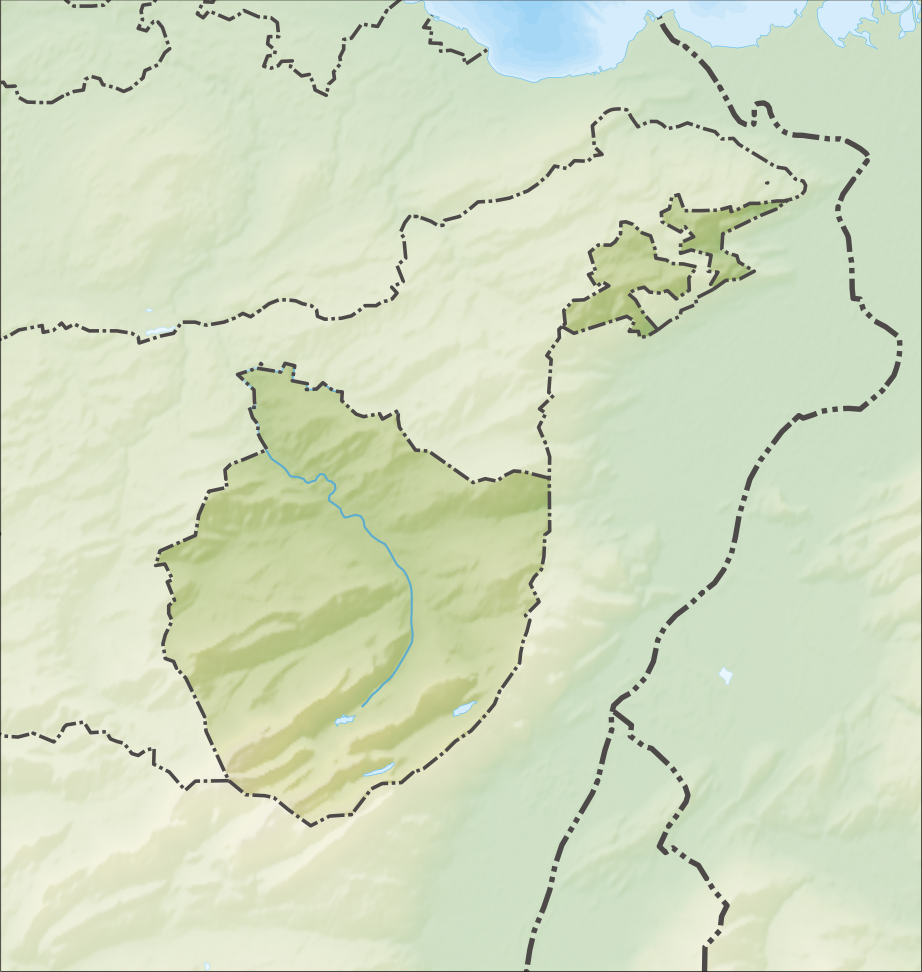
- Location within Switzerland Location within Canton of Appenzell Innerrhoden
- Coordinates: 47°19′52″N 9°24′41″E
- Country: Switzerland
- Canton: Appenzell Innerrhoden
- District: Appenzell; Schwende; Rüte

Government
  - Executive: none
  - Parliament: none
- Elevation (Landsgemeindeplatz): 777 m (2,549 ft)

Population (2018)
  - Total: 6,000
- Demonym: German: Appenzeller(in)
- Time zone: UTC+01:00 (CET)
  - Summer (DST): UTC+02:00 (CEST)
- Postal code: 9050
- SFOS number: n/a
- ISO 3166 code: CH-AI
- Website: https://www.appenzell.org/

Appenzell (Swiss Standard German pronunciation: [ˈapn̩ˌtsɛl]) is a village, though considered as a town by the FSO, and the capital of the canton of Appenzell Innerrhoden in Switzerland. Appenzell has no municipal government of its own; rather, the different parts of Appenzell belong to and are governed by the districts Appenzell and Schwende-Rüte. Because of that, for firefighting, energy and water, the village of Appenzell has a special-purpose municipality, the Feuerschaugemeinde.

== History ==
In 1071, the village was referred to as Abbacella. By 1223, this changed to Abbatiscella, meaning the Abbot's cell. This refers to the abbot of the Abbey of Saint Gall.

The buildings in the village core, the parish church, the 1563 town hall, the Salesis house, the ruins of Clanx Castle, and the state archives with the administration building are listed as heritage sites of national importance.

== Notable people ==
- Roman Signer (born 1938 in Appenzell) is a visual artist who works in sculpture, art installations, photography, and video.
- Theresia Rohner (born 1954 in Herisau) lived in Appenzell while she campaigned for women's suffrage in Appenzell Innerrhoden.

== Transport ==
Appenzell railway station is a junction station of the Gossau–Wasserauen and the Appenzell–St. Gallen–Trogen railways, which are both operated by Appenzell Railways (Appenzeller Bahnen, AB). The station is served by the S21 and S23, which links Appenzell to St. Gallen, Herisau and Gossau SG, respectively, which are served by long-distance trains.

== Gallery ==
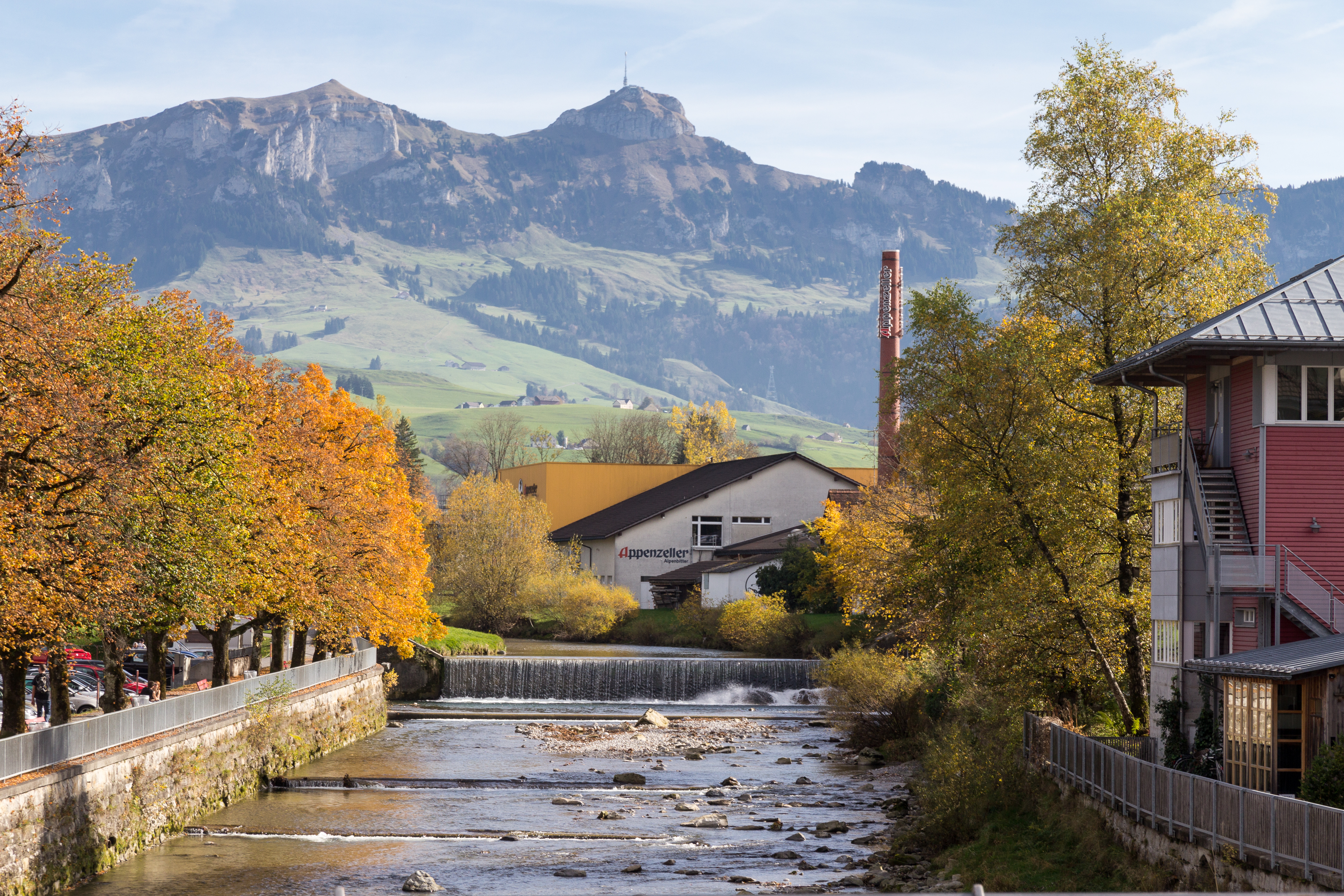
Distillery "Appenzeller Alpenbitter" at the river Sitter and the mountains Kamor and Hoher Kasten in the background

Aerial view from 400 metres (1,300 ft) by Walter Mittelholzer (1922)

== See also ==
- Tourism in Switzerland
- Appenzell Alps
