= Fälensee =

Lake in Appenzell Innerrhoden, Switzerland

Fälensee Fählensee
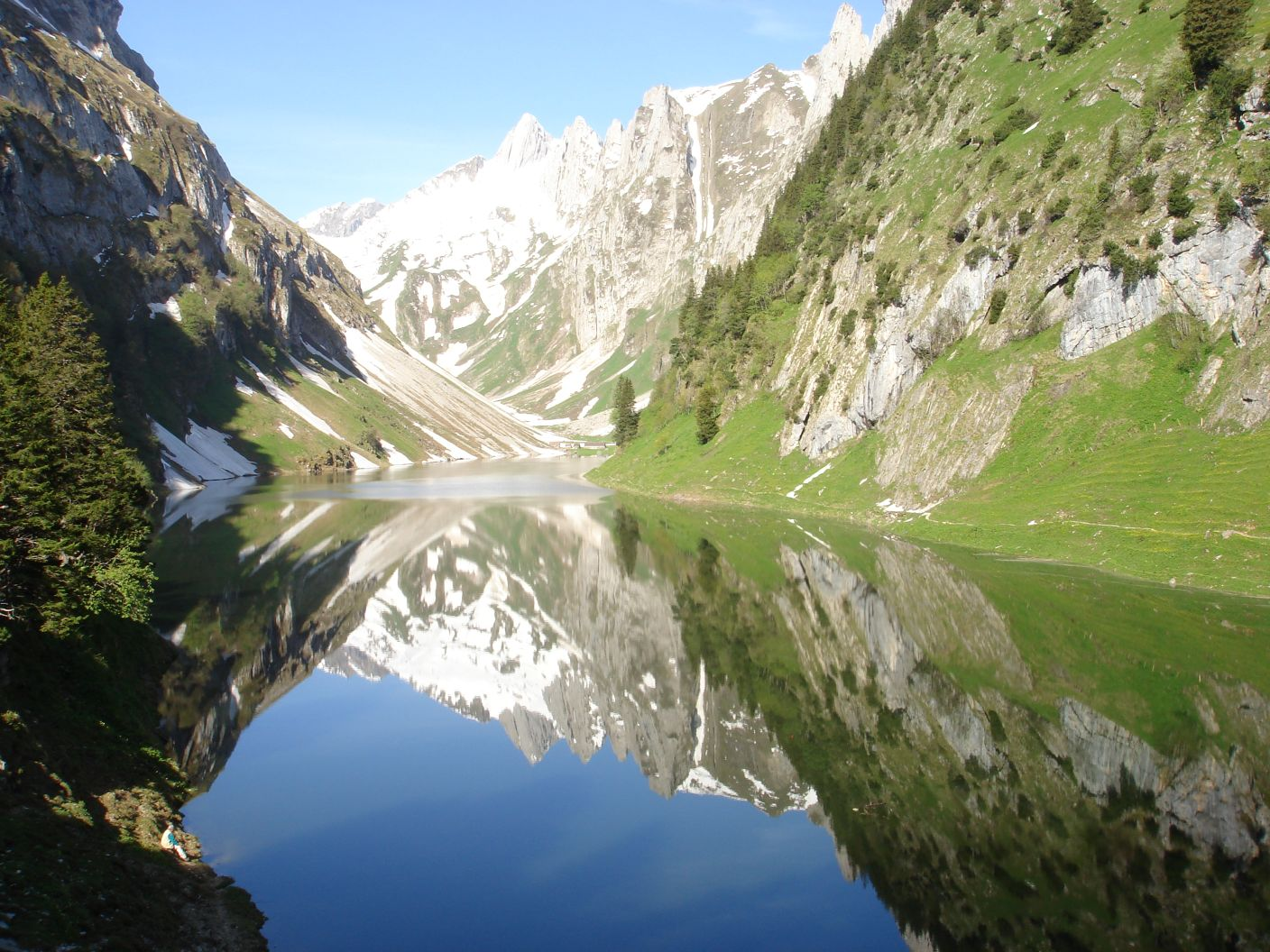

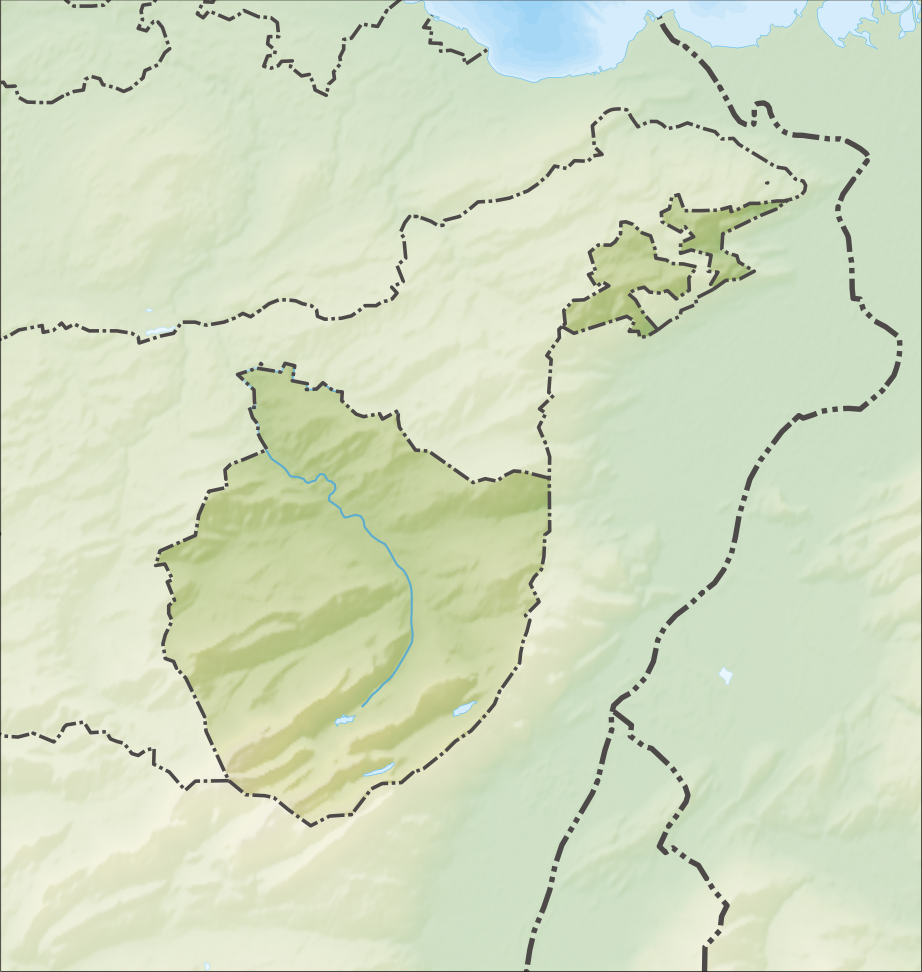
- Location within Canton of Appenzell Innerrhoden Location within Switzerland Location within Alps
- Interactive map of Fälensee; Fählensee
- Location: Appenzell Innerrhoden
- Coordinates: 47°15′6″N 9°25′0″E
- Primary outflows: subterranean
- Basin countries: Switzerland
- Max. length: 1 km (0.62 mi)
- Max. width: 0.3 km (0.19 mi)
- Surface area: 0.12 km^{2} (0.046 sq mi)
- Surface elevation: 1,446 m (4,744 ft)

Fälensee (or Fählensee) is a lake in the Alpstein range of the canton of Appenzell Innerrhoden, Switzerland. At an elevation of 1446 m, the surface area is 0.12 km^{2}. It is located in a narrow valley between Hundsteingrat and Roslen-Saxer First.

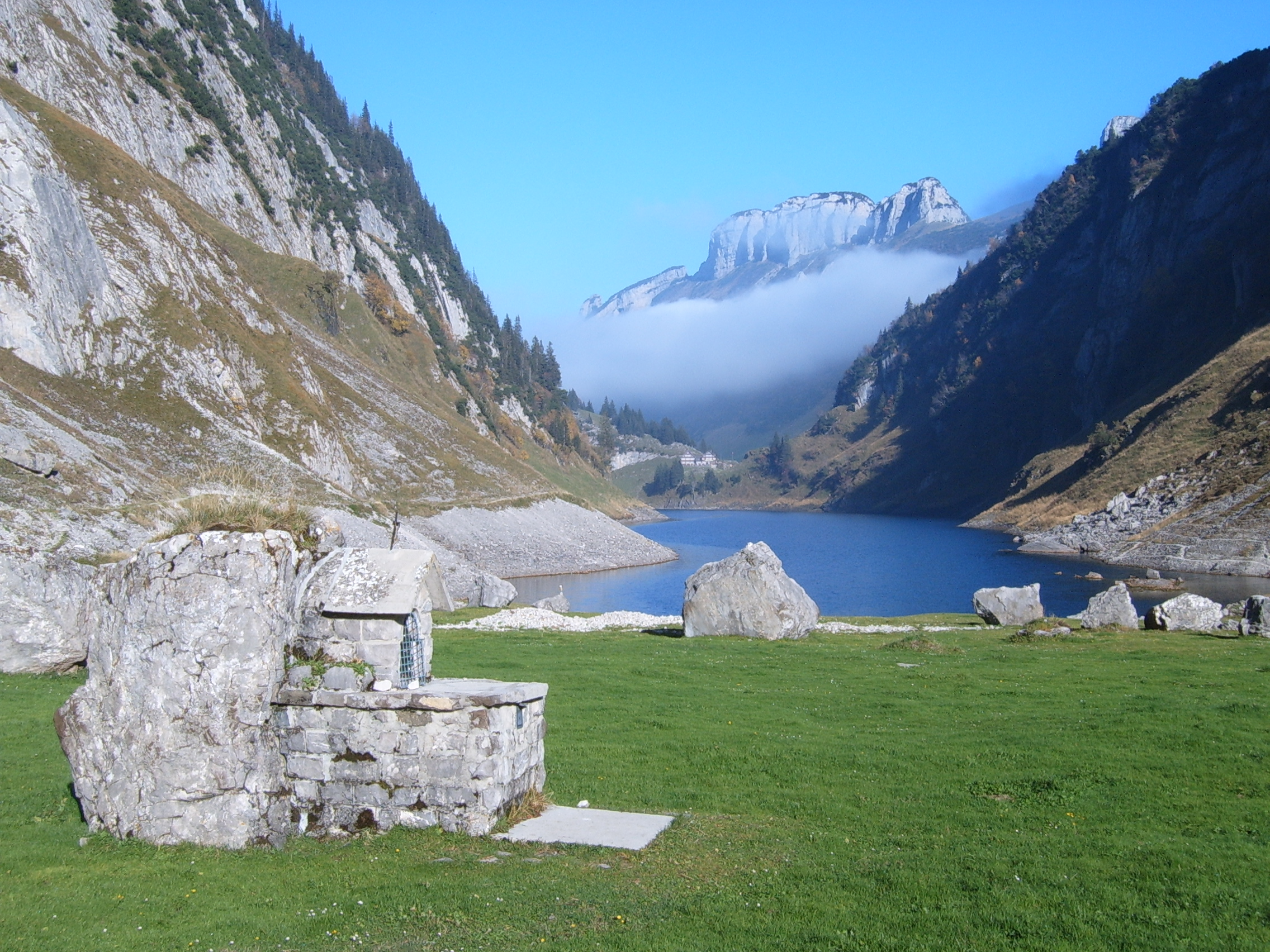
Fälensee

== See also ==
- List of mountain lakes of Switzerland
