= Appenzell Innerrhoden =

Canton of Switzerland

Canton of Appenzell Innerrhoden Kanton Appenzell Innerrhoden (German) Canton of Appenzell Inner-Rhodes
- Canton
- Flag Coat of arms Brandmark
- Interactive map of Canton of Appenzell Innerrhoden
- Coordinates: 47°18′N 9°24′E
- Country: Switzerland
- Capital: Appenzell
- Subdivisions: 5 districts

Government
  - President: Roland Dähler
  - Executive: Standeskommission (7)
  - Legislative: Grand Council of Appenzell Innerrhoden - Landsgemeinde; Grosser Rat (49)

Area
  - Total: 172.48 km^{2} (66.59 sq mi)

Population (December 2020)
  - Total: 16,293
  - Density: 94.463/km^{2} (244.66/sq mi)

GDP
  - Total: CHF 1.043 billion (2020)
  - Per capita: CHF 64,358 (2020)
- ISO 3166 code: CH-AI
- Highest point: 2,502 m (8,209 ft): Säntis
- Lowest point: 560 m (1,837 ft): Appenzell Ausserrhoden and St. Gallen border
- Joined: 1513
- Languages: German
- Website: www.ai.ch

Canton of Appenzell Innerrhoden (German: Kanton Appenzell Innerrhoden [ˈapn̩tsɛl ˈɪnərˌroːdn̩]; Romansh: Chantun Appenzell Dadens; French: Canton d'Appenzell Rhodes-Intérieures; Italian: Canton Appenzello Interno), in English sometimes Appenzell Inner-Rhodes, is one of the 26 cantons forming the Swiss Confederation. It is composed of five districts. The seat of the government and parliament is Appenzell. It is traditionally considered a "half-canton", the other half being Appenzell Ausserrhoden.

Appenzell Innerrhoden is the smallest canton of Switzerland by population and the second smallest by area. It is located in the northeast of the country. Together with the canton of Appenzell Ausserrhoden, it forms an enclave within the canton of St. Gallen. The canton is essentially located in the Alpine foothills of the Alpstein massif, culminating at the Säntis.

Appenzell Innerrhoden was part of the historical canton of Appenzell, which was divided into Appenzell Ausserrhoden (Protestant) and Appenzell Innerrhoden (Catholic) in 1597 as a result of the Swiss Reformation.

== History ==
=== Prehistory ===
The earliest evidence of human activity within the canton goes back to the Paleolithic period (45,000–30,000 years ago). Excavations at the Wildkirchli caves between 1903 and 1908 revealed stone tools and bones of cave bears. The region mostly remained unpopulated wilderness until the 8th century AD (the only evidence for human presence from this interval is a Bronze Age axe found between Appenzell and Weissbad).The Romans mostly settled in the Alpine Rhine Valley and the shores of Lake Constance.

=== Foundation ===
The name Appenzell (Latin: abbatis cella) means "cell (i.e., estate) of the abbot". This refers to the Abbey of St. Gall, which exerted a great influence on the area. By the middle of the 11th century, the abbots of St. Gall had established their power in the land later called Appenzell, which, too, became thoroughly Teutonized, its early inhabitants having probably been Romanized Raetians.

By about 1360, conflicts over grazing rights, taxes, and tithes were causing concern for both the abbot and the farmers of Appenzell. Both parties wanted to protect their rights and interests by joining the new Swabian League. In 1377, Appenzell was allowed to join the League with the support of the cities of Konstanz and St. Gallen (the city of St. Gallen was often at odds with the neighboring Abbey of St. Gall). With the support of the League, Appenzell refused to pay many of the gifts and tithes that the Abbot Kuno von Stoffeln demanded. In response to the loss of revenue from his estates, Kuno approached the Austrian House of Habsburg for help. In 1392, he agreed with the Habsburgs, which was renewed in 1402. In response, in 1401, Appenzell allied with the city of St. Gallen to protect their rights and freedom.

=== Independence and joining the Swiss Confederation ===
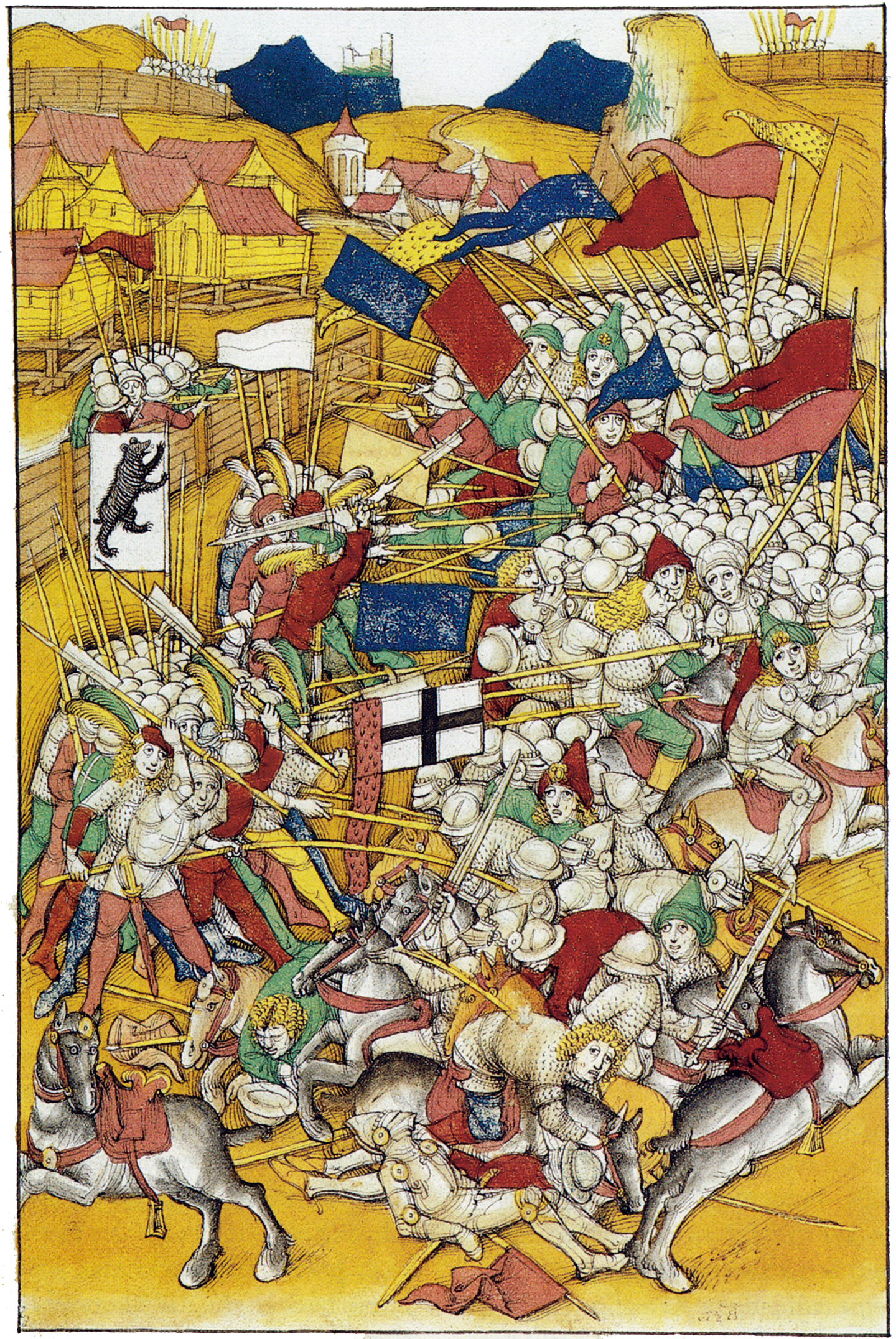
Battle of Vögelinsegg

Following increasing conflicts between the Appenzellers and the abbot's agents, including the bailiff of Appenzell demanding that a dead body be dug up because he wanted the man's clothes, the Appenzellers planned an uprising. On a pre-arranged day, throughout the abbot's lands, they attacked the bailiffs and drove them out of the land. Following unsuccessful negotiations, Appenzell and St. Gallen entered into a treaty, which marked a break between the abbot and his estates. Perhaps fearing the Habsburgs, in 1402 the League expelled Appenzell. During the same year, St. Gallen reached an agreement with the abbot, and Appenzell could no longer count on St. Gallen's support. Appenzell declared itself ready to stand against the abbot, and in 1403 allied with the canton of Schwyz, a member of the Old Swiss Confederation that had defeated the Austrians in the previous century. Glarus provided less support, but authorized any citizen who wished to support Appenzell to do so. In response, the League raised an army. It marched to St. Gallen before heading toward Appenzell. On 15 May 1403, they entered the pass leading to Speicher and, outside the village of Vögelinsegg, met the Appenzell army. A small force of Appenzell and Confederation troops defeated the League army, and the two sides signed a short-lived peace treaty.

Following another Appenzell victory on 17 June 1405, at Stoss Pass on the border of Appenzell town, the new canton continued to expand. During the expansion, Appenzell even captured the abbot of St. Gall, and in response, they were excommunicated by the Bishop of Constance.

However, while the Bund expanded, the Austrians used the peace to regain their strength. On 11 September 1406 an association of nobles formed a knightly order known as the Sankt Jörgenschild (Order of St. George's Shield) to oppose the rebellious commoners of the Bund. Following a defeat at Bregenz, Appenzell was unable to hold the Bund together. The city of St. Gallen and the canton of Schwyz each paid off the Austrians to avoid an attack, and the Bund was dissolved by King Rupert of Germany on 4 April 1408.

As part of the peace treaty, the abbot gave up his ownership of Appenzell, but was still owed certain taxes. However, it was not until 1410 that the area was at peace.

In 1411, Appenzell signed a defensive treaty with the entire Swiss Confederation (except Bern), which strengthened their position against the abbot. Appenzell joined the Confederation as an "Associate Member" and did not become a full member until 1513. Following another battle, in 1429, Appenzell was granted freedom from the obligations in the future. This treaty represented the end of Appenzell's last financial tie to the Abbey of St. Gall, and a movement towards closer relationships with the Confederation.

=== Division of Appenzell ===
Starting in 1522, followers of Martin Luther and Huldrych Zwingli began to preach the Protestant Reformation in Appenzell. The early reformers had the most success in the outer Rhoden, a term that in the singular is said to mean a "clearing", and occurs in 1070, long before the final separation. Following the initial small success, in 1523 Joachim von Watt (also known as Joachim Vadian) began to preach the reformed version of the Acts of the Apostles to friends and fellow clergy. His preaching brought the Reformation to the forefront of public debate. In October 1523, the Council supported the Protestant principle of scriptural sermons, and on 24 April 1524, the Landsgemeinde confirmed the Cantonal Council's decision. However, the work of the Anabaptists in the Appenzell region (as well as in Zürich and St. Gallen) in 1525 led to government crackdowns. The first police action against the Anabaptists took place in June 1525, followed by the Anabaptist Disputation in Teufen in October 1529.

To end the confrontation between the old and new faiths, the Landesgemeinde decided in April 1525 that each parish should choose a faith, but that the principle of free movement would be supported, so that the religious minority could attend the church of their choice regardless of where they lived. The entire Appenzell Ausserrhoden converted to the Reformation in 1529. The Innerrhoden remained with the old faith. While the majority of the residents of Appenzell town remained Catholic under Pastor Diepolt Huter, there was a strong Reformed minority. In 1531, the minority were nearly successful in getting the town to ally with the Protestant Ausserrhoden. But an armed mob of angry residents from the neighboring village of Gonten prevented the abolition of the Mass in Appenzell. The Catholic victory in the Second War of Kappel in 1531 ended plans for a reformation of the entire Canton of Appenzell.

After the Second War of Kappel, the two religions reached a generally peaceful parity. They remained united by common business interests, the same political and legal understanding, a shared desire to ally with France, and a shared opposition to the city of St. Gallen. This shared opposition to St. Gallen was demonstrated in the so-called linen affairs (1535–42, 1579), in which the weavers throughout Appenzell supported each other when they felt that they were unfairly treated by the linen industry of St. Gallen.

From 1798 to 1803, Appenzell, with the other domains of the abbot of St Gall, was formed into the canton of Säntis of the Helvetic Republic, but in 1803, on the creation of the new canton of St. Gall, shrank back within its former boundaries.

=== Modern history ===
Appenzell Innerrhoden has voted against each new Constitution of Switzerland since 1848. The people of the Appenzell Innerrhoden have objected to the trend towards a stronger central government in Switzerland.

Appenzell Innerrhoden was the last canton in Switzerland to grant women the right to vote on local issues, being forced to do so only in 1990 when two women from Appenzell filed a lawsuit in the Swiss Federal Court, including Theresia Rohner, and won. A centuries-old law forbidding women to vote was changed in 1991, when Switzerland's federal court ordered the canton to grant women the right to vote.

Appenzell Innerrhoden was the canton with the smallest percentage of approval votes (at 50.8% compared to the Swiss-wide average of 64.1%) in the "Marriage for All" referendum completed on 26 September 2021, making it the most hesitant canton for equal marriage for gay and lesbian citizens.

== Geography ==
Most of the canton is pastoral, despite being largely mountainous. The Säntis peak in the Appenzell Alps is one of the main attractions of the canton. The main river is the Sitter. There are three small mountain lakes, located in the Alpstein massif: Seealpsee, Sämtisersee, and Fälensee.

Two small monasteries, Wonnenstein in Teufen and Grimmenstein in Walzenhausen, are exclaves of the canton in Appenzell Ausserrhoden.

== Politics ==
Appenzell is the capital of this canton. The constitution was established in 1872. Citizens from the canton assemble each year on the last Sunday of April for the Landsgemeinde (general assembly) in a square in Appenzell; they elect the cantonal government and judiciary, accept the oath of the elected members, and vote on several issues on the agenda; about 4000 citizens usually participate.

In 1991, following a decision by the Federal Supreme Court of Switzerland, Appenzell Innerrhoden became the last Swiss canton to grant women the vote on local issues. It also was the canton with the strongest support (71%) for the minaret ban in the 2009 Swiss minaret referendum and the lowest support (51%) in the 2021 Swiss same-sex marriage referendum.

=== Political subdivisions ===
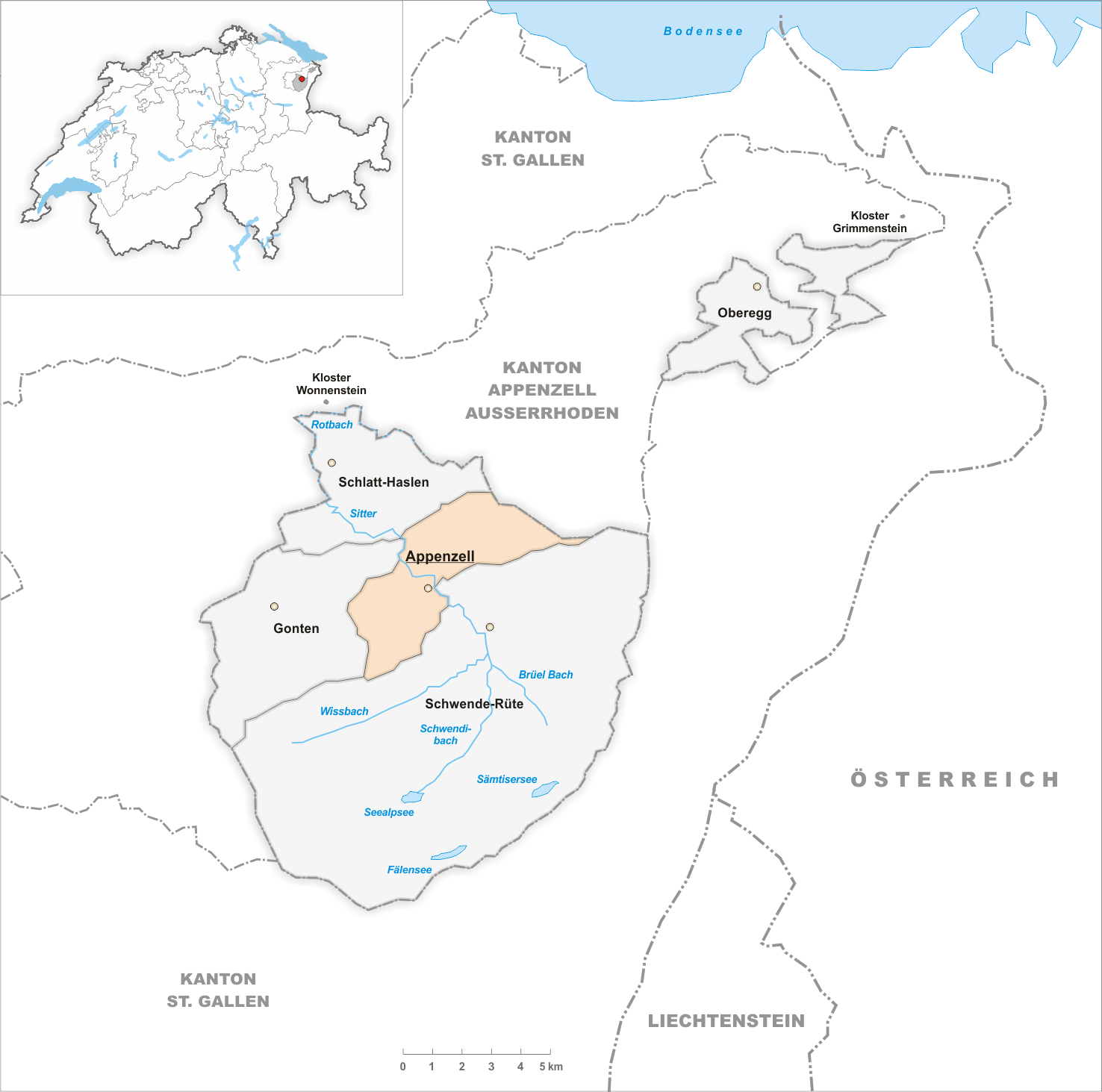
Appenzell Innerrhoden districts

In Appenzell Innerrhoden, districts (Bezirk(e)) are the lowest administrative division, as the canton has no municipalities (except for the Feuerschaugemeinde, a special-purpose municipality for firefighting, energy, and water for the town of Appenzell). The districts are functionally equivalent to municipalities elsewhere in Switzerland, and are generally shown as municipalities on maps, etc.

The canton is divided into five districts:

- Appenzell
- Gonten
- Oberegg
- Schlatt-Haslen
- Schwende-Rüte

On 1 May 2022, the former districts of Rüte and Schwende merged to form the new district of Schwende-Rüte.

=== Government ===
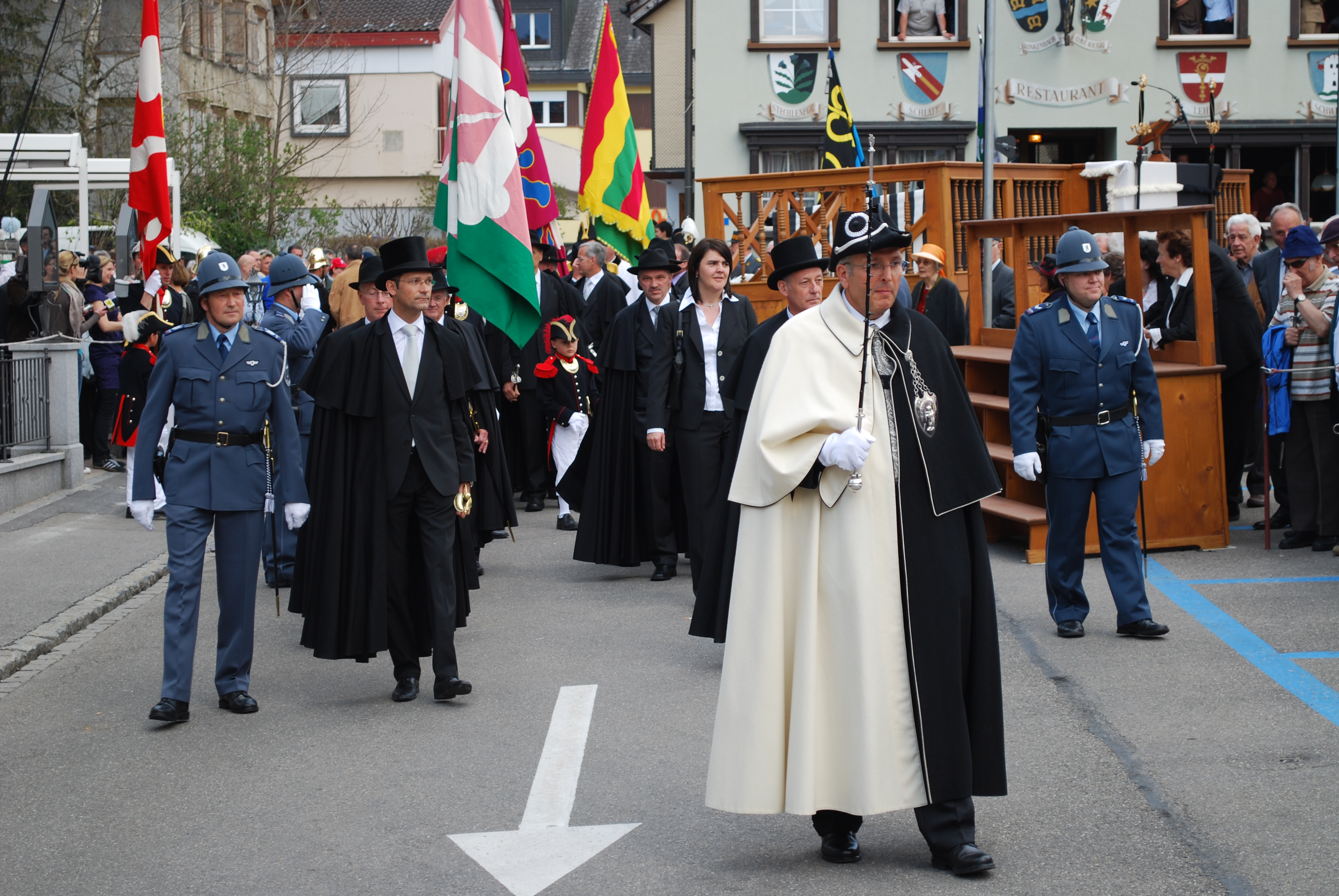
The procession of the Appenzell Innerrhoden government after the Landsgemeinde in 2010

The State Commission (Standeskommission) constitutes the executive government of the canton of Appenzell Inner-Rhodes and operates as a collegiate authority. It is composed of seven councillors (German: Regierungsrat/-rätin), each presiding over a department (Departement) comprising several offices and bureaus. The president of the executive department acts as an executive president (regierender Landammann). In the mandate period (Legislatur) 2019 – 2021, the State Commission is presided over by regierender Landammann Roland Dähler. The regierende Landammann and the stillstehender Landammann (stationary president) are switched every two years. Departmental tasks, coordination measures, and implementation of laws decreed by the canton's parliament, the Grosse Rat, and the Landsgemeinde, as well as legal judgments, are carried out by the State Commission. The regular (re-)election of the State Commission by the Landsgemeinde is held every year. Any resident of Appenzell Inner-Rhodes allowed to vote can be elected as a member of the State Commission. The assignment of the departments for the Säckelmeister (minister of finance), Landeshauptmann (country's captain), Bauherr (minister of building and civil engineering), and Landesfähnrich (country's ensign) is given by their roles. The departments of education, economics, and health and social services are assigned by the collegiate to the two Landammänner and the Statthalter.

As of December 2021, Appenzell Inner-Rhodes' State Commission is made up of two members of the CVP (Christian Democratic People's Party), one member of the SVP (Swiss People's Party), and four independents of whom one is currently also the president. The last regular election (Landsgemeinde) was held on 28 April 2019.

The State Commission (Standeskommission) of Appenzell Innerrhoden
Executive Councillor (Regierungsrat/-rätin)	Title	Party	Head of Department (Departement, since) of	elected since
Roland Dähler	regierender Landammann 2021-23	Independent	Economics (Volkswirtschaftsdepartement, 2019)	2019
Roland Inauen	stillstehender Landammann 2021-23	Independent	Education (Erziehungsdepartement, 2013)	2013
Monika Bless Rüegg	Frau Statthalter	CVP	Health and Social Services (Gesundheits- und Sozialdepartement, 2020)	2020
Ruedi Eberle	Säckelmeister	SVP	Finances (Finanzdepartement, 2018)	2018
Stefan Müller	Landeshauptmann	Independent	Agriculture and Forestry (Land- und Forstwirtschaftsdepartement, 2015)	2015
Ruedi Ulmann	Bauherr	CVP	Building and Civil Engineering (Bau- und Umweltdepartement, 2017)	2017
Jakob Signer	Landesfähnrich	Independent	Judiciary, Police, and Military (Justiz-, Polizei- und Militärdepartement, 2019)	2019

=== Parliament ===
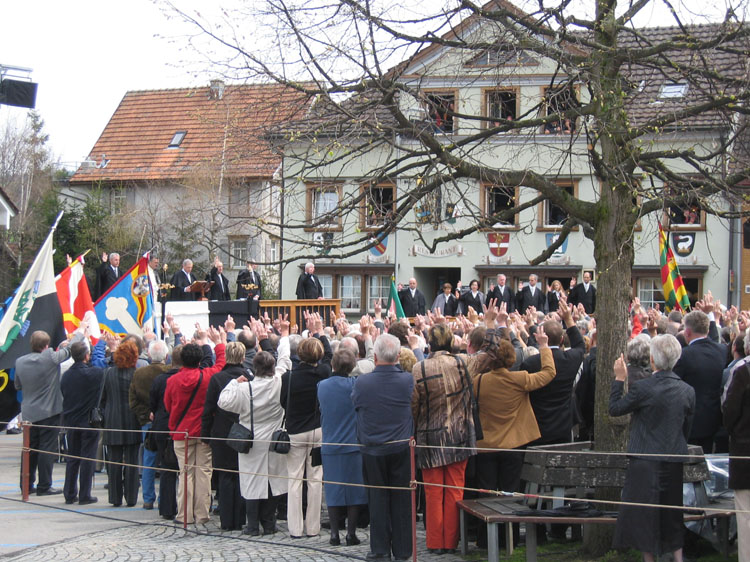
Landsgemeinde in Appenzell Innerrhoden

==== Landsgemeinde ====
Citizens from the canton assemble on the last Sunday of April each year for the Landsgemeinde (literally: country's assembly) in the central square in Appenzell, elect the cantonal government and judiciary, accept the oath of the elected members, and vote on several issues put forward by the government and/or the parliament. It is presided over by the regierende Landammann.

Every Swiss citizen of Appenzell Inner-Rhodes older than 18 has the right to vote and to step onto the Stuhl (literally the chair, but in fact the podium) and to debate the election of the proposed members of government and judiciary, or any of the issues to be voted on.

After the State Commission has taken their seats on the Stuhl and the regierende Landammann opens and welcomes the assembly, (s)he then presents the state bill. Then the discussions are opened. Then the elections and the subsequent oaths take place. Finally, the votes on the programmed issues are taken.

==== Grosser Rat ====
The Grosser Rat or Grand Council is composed of 50 members, elected in the six districts of the canton. In five of the six districts, the election takes place once a year in the annual session of the district equivalent of the Landsgemeinde and therefore takes place in the open. In the other district, Oberegg District, which forms two small exclaves of the canton a few kilometres northeast of the rest, a separate ballot is held in May.

The most important tasks of the Council are providing preliminary advice on the constitutional and legislative proposals to be placed before the Landsgemeinde. Also, the issuing of regulations to enforce the canton's legislation and supervision of all the cantonal authorities. The Council reviews and approves the annual financial statements and sets the budget and the tax rates.

=== Federal elections ===
- National Council (Nationalrat): Thomas Rechsteiner, 2019
- Council of States (Ständerat): Daniel Fässler, 2019

Appenzell Inner-Rhodes' Federal Election Results
Percentage of total votes per party, 1971-2015
Party	Ideology	1971	1975	1979	1983	1987	1991	1995	1999	2003	2007	2011	2015
CVP/PDC/PPD/PCD	Christian democracy	96.1	98.3	97.2	95.6	91.8	98.7	85.4	73.5	69.2	84.6	76.1	76.3
SP/PS	Social democracy	^{[*]}	^{[*]}	^{[*]}	^{[*]}	^{[*]}	^{[*]}	^{[*]}	^{[*]}	^{[*]}	^{[*]}	20.3	18.1
SVP/UDC	Swiss nationalism	^{[*]}	^{[*]}	^{[*]}	^{[*]}	^{[*]}	^{[*]}	^{[*]}	25.7	^{[*]}	^{[*]}	^{[*]}	^{[*]}
Other		3.9	1.7	2.8	4.4	8.2	1.3	14.6	0.7	30.8	15.4	3.6	5.6
Voter participation %		31.3	29.6	24.0	24.5	22.6	39.9	17.4	51.5	35.1	21.1	37.3	36.7
		^{*} Party was not on the ballot											

== Demographics ==
The population of the canton (as of 31 December 2020) is 16,293. As of 2007, the population included 1,510 foreigners, or about 9.76% of the total population. Owing to the split of Appenzell along religious lines, the population (as of 2000) is mostly Roman Catholic (81%), with a small Protestant minority (10%).

=== Historical population ===
The historical population is given in the following table:

Historic population data
Year	Total population	Swiss	Non-Swiss	Population share of total country
1850	11,272	11,198	74	0.5%
1900	13,499	13,170	329	0.4%
1950	13,427	13,095	332	0.3%
1990	13,870	12,524	1,326	0.2%
2020	16,293			0.2%

== Economy ==
Cattle breeding and dairy farming are the main agricultural activities: Appenzeller cheese is widely available throughout Switzerland. Somewhat before the early 2000s, the countryside of Appenzell Innerrhoden became popular with nudists, and at the 2009 Landsgemeinde the canton's residents voted to prohibit naked hiking. However nudists who appealed against their fines to the federal court have been reimbursed by the local authorities, as nudism is not a crime under Swiss federal law which takes precedence. It is common for cars rented in Switzerland to be registered in Appenzell Innerrhoden, and thus have license plates starting with "AI", because of the reduced tax on cars in this canton.

== Transport ==
Regional rail in Appenzell Innerrhoden and neighbouring areas is provided by St. Gallen S-Bahn, with some services also being part of the Bodensee S-Bahn. Services are operated by Appenzell Railways (Appenzeller Bahnen, AB) over its meter gauge lines. PostAuto buses serve towns and villages within the canton. Rail and bus services operate within the Ostwind tariff network.

Several cable cars provide access to mountains.

The nearest airports are St. Gallen–Altenrhein Airport and Zurich Airport.

== See also ==
- Landsgemeinde
- List of castles and fortresses in Switzerland
