= Kronberg (mountain) =

Mountain in Switzerland

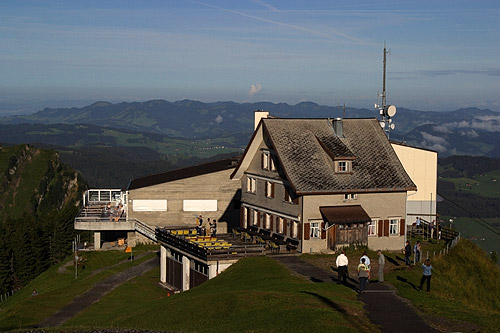
- View from the summit

Highest point
- Elevation: 1,663 m (5,456 ft)
- Prominence: 351 m (1,152 ft)
- Parent peak: Säntis
- Coordinates: 47°17′29″N 9°19′46″E

Geography
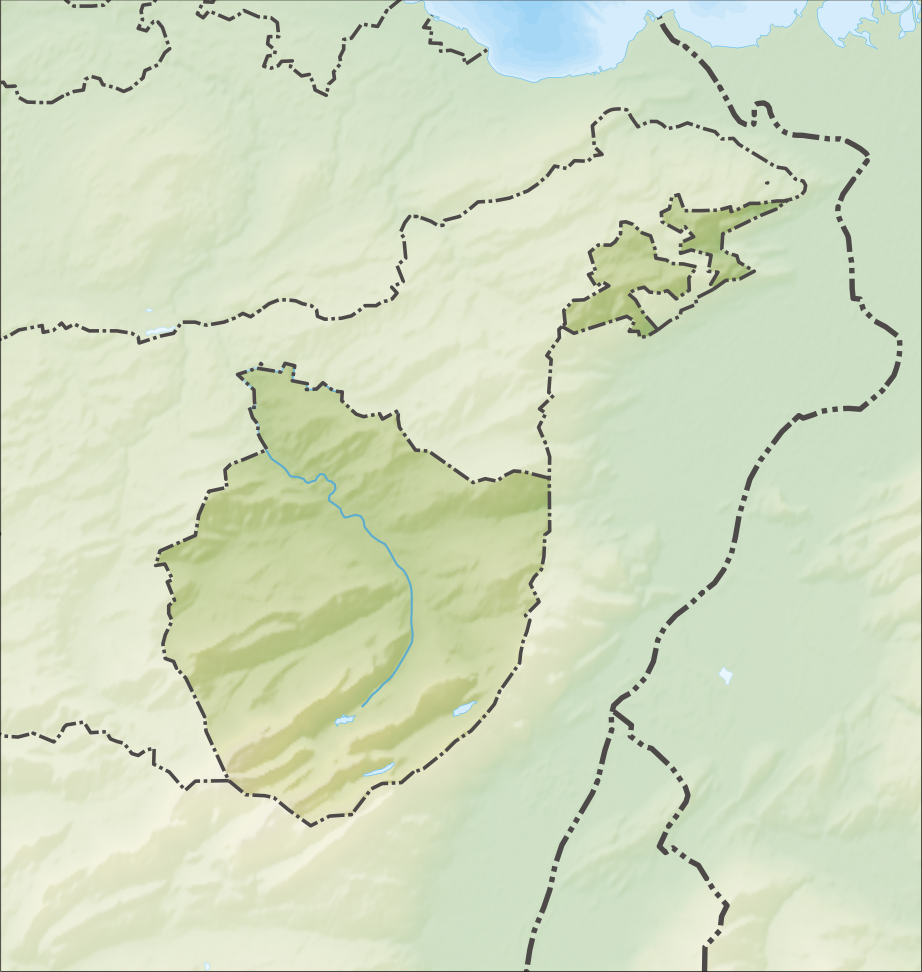
- Location within Switzerland Location within Canton of Appenzell Innerrhoden Location within Alps
- Location: Appenzell Innerrhoden, Switzerland
- Parent range: Appenzell Alps

The Kronberg is a mountain of the Appenzell Alps, in the Swiss canton of Appenzell Innerrhoden, located west of Appenzell and north of Säntis. Its summit, which features a restaurant, is at 1,663-metre-high (5,456 ft). It offers a scenic view of the Alpstein and Lake Constance.

== Hiking ==
The Kronberg is an easily ascendable mountain and a popular excursion destination. It can be hiked on foot as well as on signposted snowshoe tours in winter, for example from Schwägalp Pass, Gonten, Jakobsbad or Appenzell.

== Transport ==
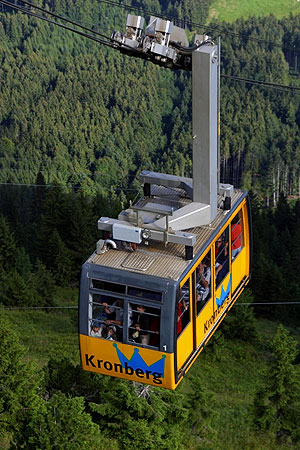
Kronberg cable car

The summit of Kronberg can be accessed by a cable car. The valley station is located adjacent to Jakobsbad railway station, which is served half-hourly by the S23 service of St. Gallen S-Bahn to Appenzell or Herisau/Gossau SG.

== See also ==
- List of mountains of Appenzell Innerrhoden
- List of mountains of Switzerland accessible by public transport
- Tourism in Switzerland
