= Weissbad railway station =

Train station in Switzerland

Weissbad
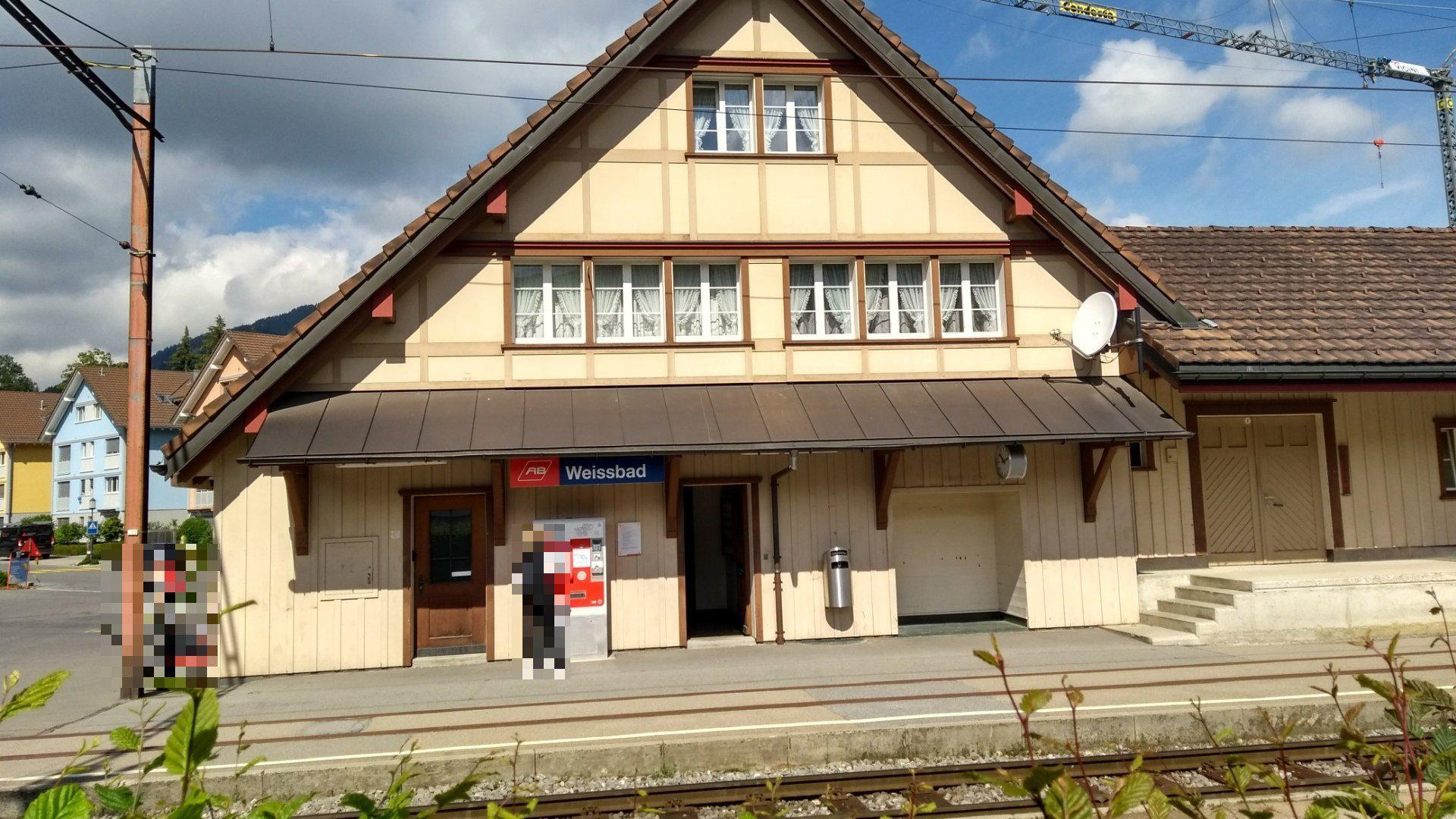
- The station building in 2018

General information
- Location: Rüte, Appenzell Innerrhoden; Switzerland
- Coordinates: 47°18′37″N 9°26′09″E
- Elevation: 817 m (2,680 ft)
- Owner: Appenzell Railways
- Line: Gossau–Wasserauen line
- Distance: 29.0 km (18.0 mi) from Gossau SG
- Platforms: 1 island platform; 1 side platform
- Tracks: 2
- Train operators: Appenzell Railways
- Connections
- Bus: PostAuto bus route 192

Other information
- Fare zone: 248 (Tarifverbund Ostwind)

Services
Preceding station	St. Gallen S-Bahn	Following station
Steinegg towards Gossau SG	S23	Schwende towards Wasserauen
Location
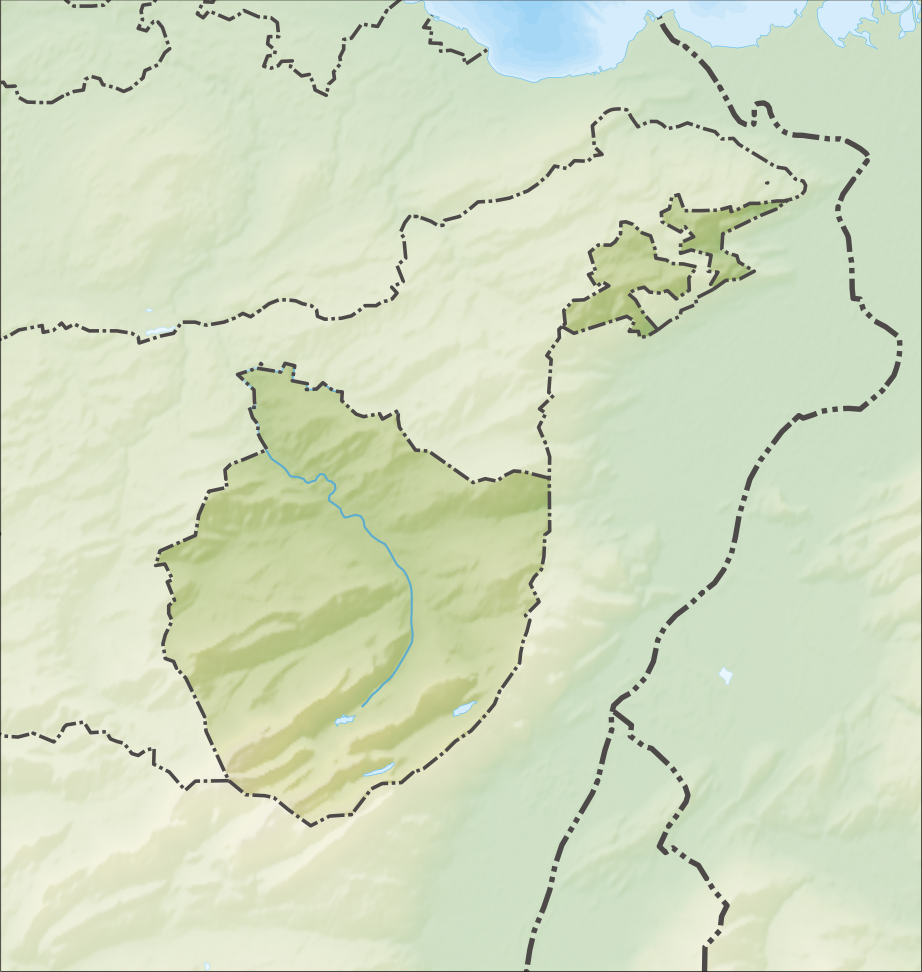
- Location within Switzerland Location within Canton of Appenzell Innerrhoden

Weissbad railway station (German: Bahnhof Weissbad) is a railway station in the district of Rüte, in the Swiss canton of Appenzell Innerrhoden. It is located on the 1,000 mm (3 ft 3 3/8 in) metre gauge Gossau–Wasserauen line of Appenzell Railways.

A PostAuto bus line links the railway station with Brüllisau and the valley station of the cable car to Hoher Kasten.

== Services ==
As of the December 2020 timetable change, the following services stop at Weissbad:

- St. Gallen S-Bahn S23: half-hourly service between Gossau SG (via Herisau) and Wasserauen.

== See also ==
- Rail transport in Switzerland
