= Urnäsch railway station =

Train station in Switzerland

Urnäsch
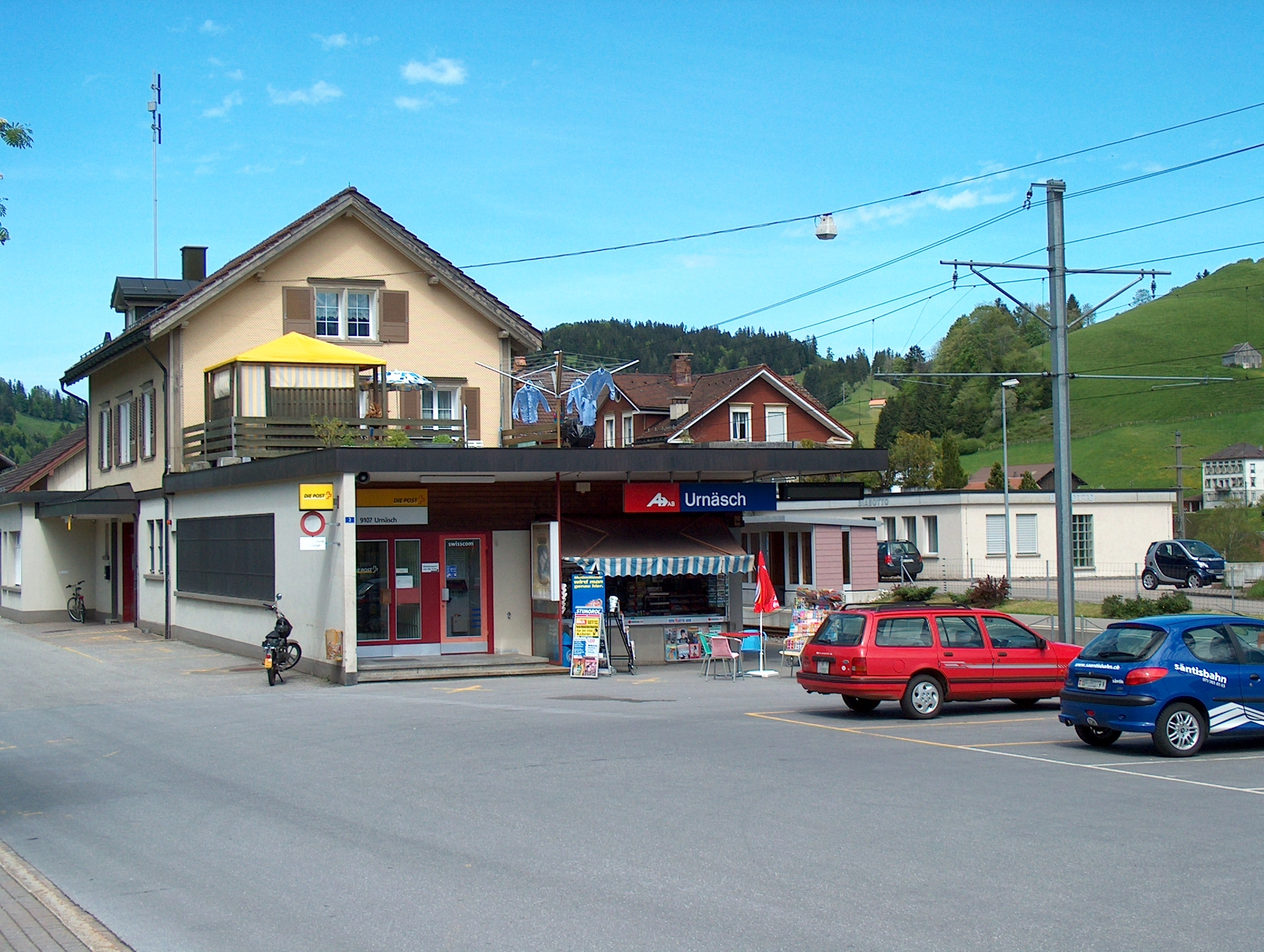
- The station building in 2005

General information
- Location: Urnäsch, Appenzell Ausserrhoden; Switzerland
- Coordinates: 47°19′04″N 9°17′08″E
- Elevation: 824 m (2,703 ft)
- Owner: Appenzell Railways
- Line: Gossau–Wasserauen line
- Distance: 15.2 km (9.4 mi) from Gossau SG
- Platforms: 2 side platforms
- Tracks: 2
- Train operators: Appenzell Railways
- Connections
- Bus: PostAuto bus route 791

Other information
- Fare zone: 271 (Tarifverbund Ostwind)

Services
Preceding station	St. Gallen S-Bahn	Following station
Zürchersmühle towards Gossau SG	S23	Jakobsbad towards Wasserauen
Location
- Location within Switzerland Location within Canton of Appenzell Ausserrhoden

Urnäsch railway station (German: Bahnhof Urnäsch) is a railway station in the municipality of Urnäsch, in the Swiss canton of Appenzell Ausserrhoden. It is located on the 1,000 mm (3 ft 3 3/8 in) metre gauge Gossau–Wasserauen line of Appenzell Railways.

== Services ==
As of the December 2020 timetable change, the following services stop at Urnäsch:

- St. Gallen S-Bahn: S23: half-hourly service between Gossau SG (via Herisau) and Wasserauen.

A PostAuto bus line links the railway station with Schwägalp Pass and the valley station of the cable car to Säntis.

== See also ==
- Rail transport in Switzerland
