= Jakobsbad railway station =

Train station in Switzerland

Jakobsbad
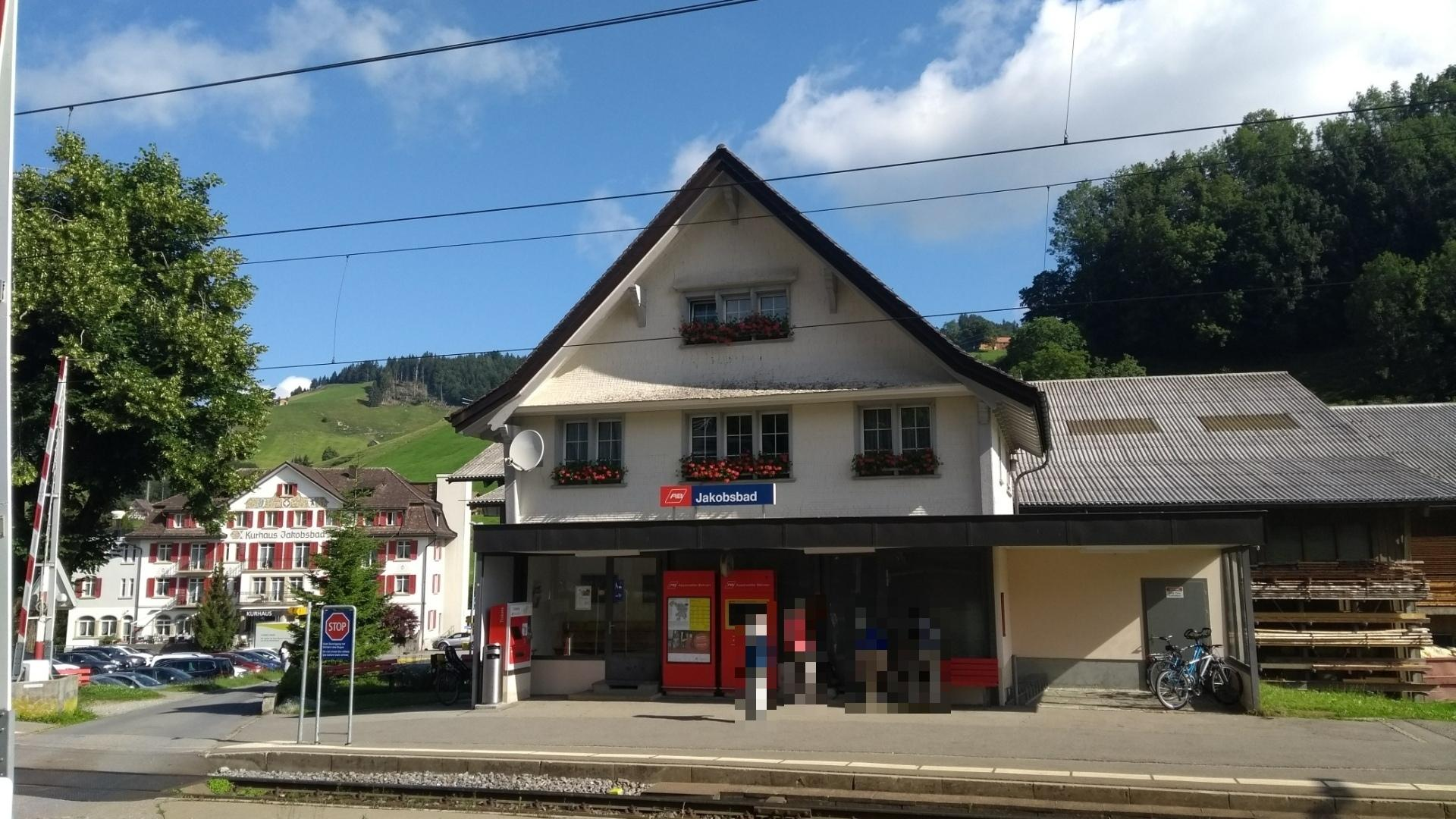
- The station building in 2018

General information
- Location: Gonten, Appenzell Innerrhoden; Switzerland
- Coordinates: 47°19′12″N 9°19′42″E
- Elevation: 873 m (2,864 ft)
- Owner: Appenzell Railways
- Line: Gossau–Wasserauen line
- Distance: 19.1 km (11.9 mi) from Gossau SG
- Platforms: 1 island platform; 1 side platform
- Tracks: 2
- Train operators: Appenzell Railways
- Connections: Jakobsbad–Kronberg cable car

Other information
- Fare zone: 249 (Tarifverbund Ostwind)

Services
Preceding station	St. Gallen S-Bahn	Following station
Urnäsch towards Gossau SG	S23	Gonten towards Wasserauen
Location
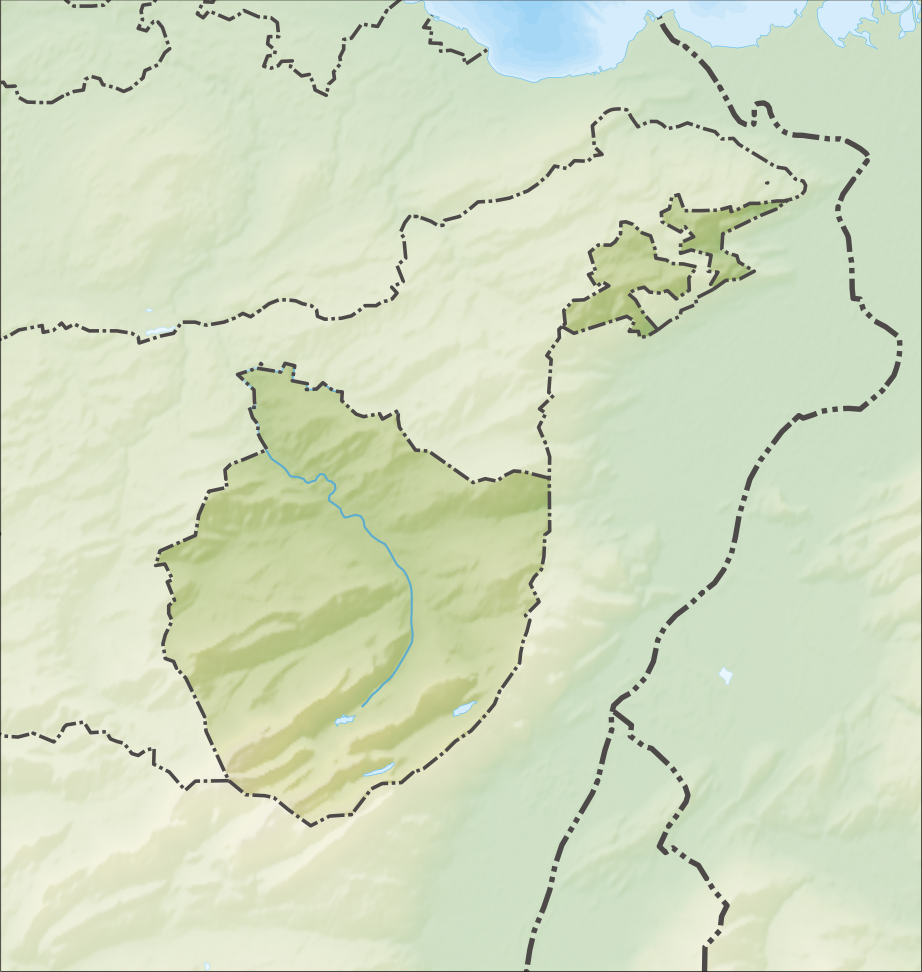
- Location within Switzerland Location within Canton of Appenzell Innerrhoden

Jakobsbad railway station (German: Bahnhof Jakobsbad) is a railway station in the district of Gonten, in the Swiss canton of Appenzell Innerrhoden. It is located on the 1,000 mm (3 ft 3 3/8 in) metre gauge Gossau–Wasserauen line of Appenzell Railways.

The valley station of the Jakobsbad–Kronberg cable car to the Kronberg is adjacent.

== Services ==
As of the December 2020 timetable change, the following services stop at Jakobsbad:

- St. Gallen S-Bahn: S23: half-hourly service between Gossau SG and Wasserauen via Appenzell.
