= Waldstatt railway station =

Train station in Switzerland

Waldstatt
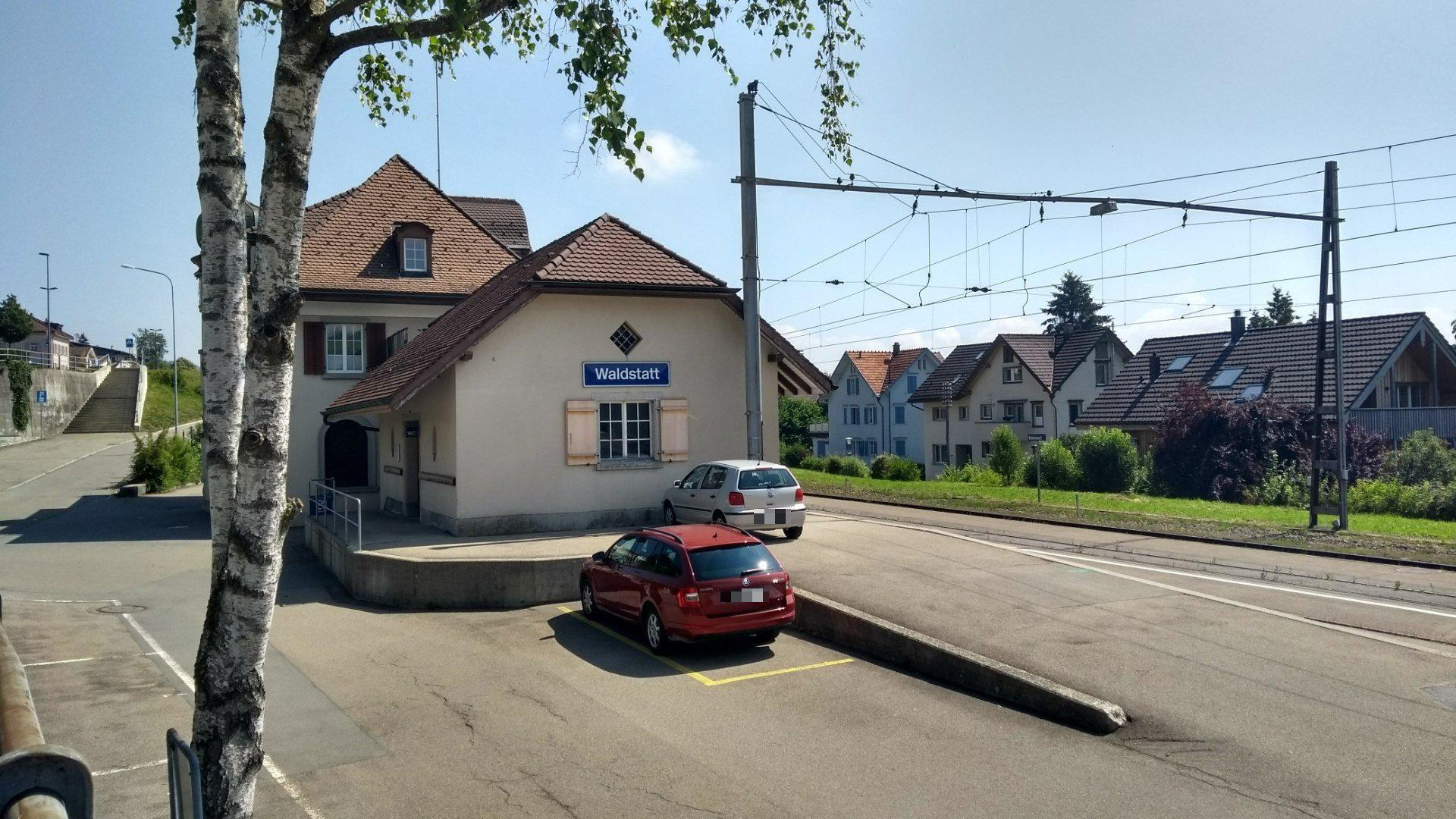
- The station building in 2018

General information
- Location: Waldstatt, Appenzell Ausserrhoden; Switzerland
- Coordinates: 47°21′27″N 9°17′10″E
- Elevation: 814 m (2,671 ft)
- Owner: Appenzell Railways
- Line: Gossau–Wasserauen line
- Distance: 9.3 km (5.8 mi) from Gossau SG
- Platforms: 2 side platforms
- Tracks: 2
- Train operators: Appenzell Railways

Other information
- Fare zone: 213 (Tarifverbund Ostwind)

History
- Opened: 1925

Services
Preceding station	St. Gallen S-Bahn	Following station
Wilen towards Gossau SG	S23	Zürchersmühle towards Wasserauen
Location
- Location within Switzerland Location within Canton of Appenzell Ausserrhoden

Waldstatt railway station (German: Bahnhof Waldstatt) is a railway station in the municipality of Waldstatt, in the Swiss canton of Appenzell Ausserrhoden. It is located on the 1,000 mm (3 ft 3 3/8 in) metre gauge Gossau–Wasserauen line of Appenzell Railways.

== History ==
The station opened in 1925. In 2020, Appenzell Railways completed a SFr 3 million renovation of the station. Improvements were made to the digital signage, platforms, and disabled access.

== Services ==
As of the December 2020 timetable change, the following services stop at Waldstatt:

- St. Gallen S-Bahn: S23: half-hourly service between Gossau SG and Wasserauen.
