= Zürchersmühle railway station =

Train station in Switzerland

Zürchersmühle
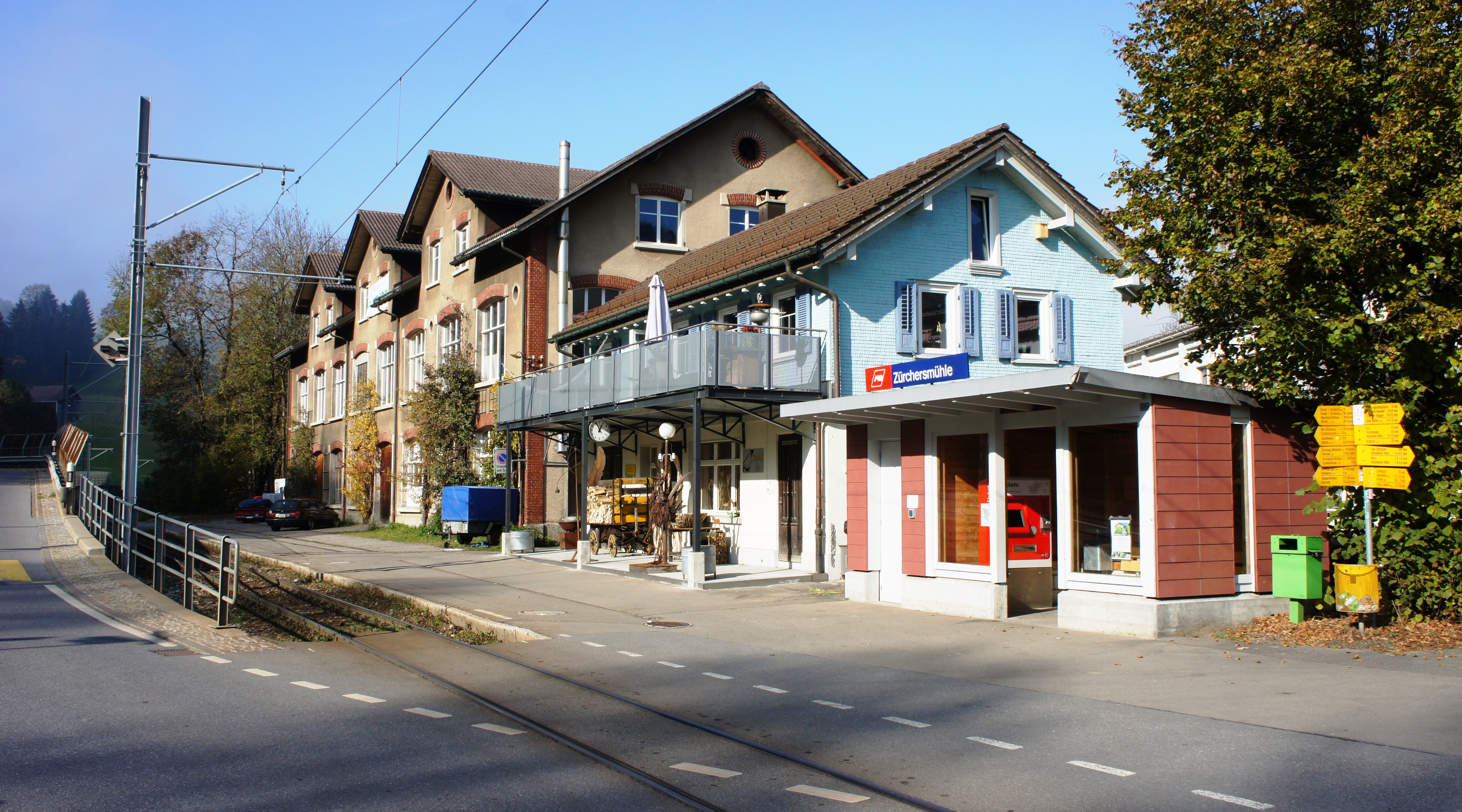
- The station in 2011

General information
- Location: Urnäsch, Appenzell Ausserrhoden; Switzerland
- Coordinates: 47°19′49″N 9°17′34″E
- Elevation: 807 m (2,648 ft)
- Owner: Appenzell Railways
- Line: Gossau–Wasserauen line
- Distance: 13.6 km (8.5 mi) from Gossau SG
- Platforms: 1 side platform
- Tracks: 1
- Train operators: Appenzell Railways

Other information
- Fare zone: 271 (Tarifverbund Ostwind)

Services
Preceding station	St. Gallen S-Bahn	Following station
Waldstatt towards Gossau SG	S23	Urnäsch towards Wasserauen
Location
- Location within Switzerland Location within Canton of Appenzell Ausserrhoden

Zürchersmühle railway station (German: Bahnhof Zürchersmühle) is a railway station in the municipality of Urnäsch, in the Swiss canton of Appenzell Ausserrhoden. It is located on the 1,000 mm (3 ft 3 3/8 in) metre gauge Gossau–Wasserauen line of Appenzell Railways.

== Services ==
As of the December 2020 timetable change, the following services stop at Zürchersmühle:

- St. Gallen S-Bahn: S23: half-hourly service between Gossau SG and Wasserauen.
