= Gonten railway station =

Railway station in Switzerland

Gonten
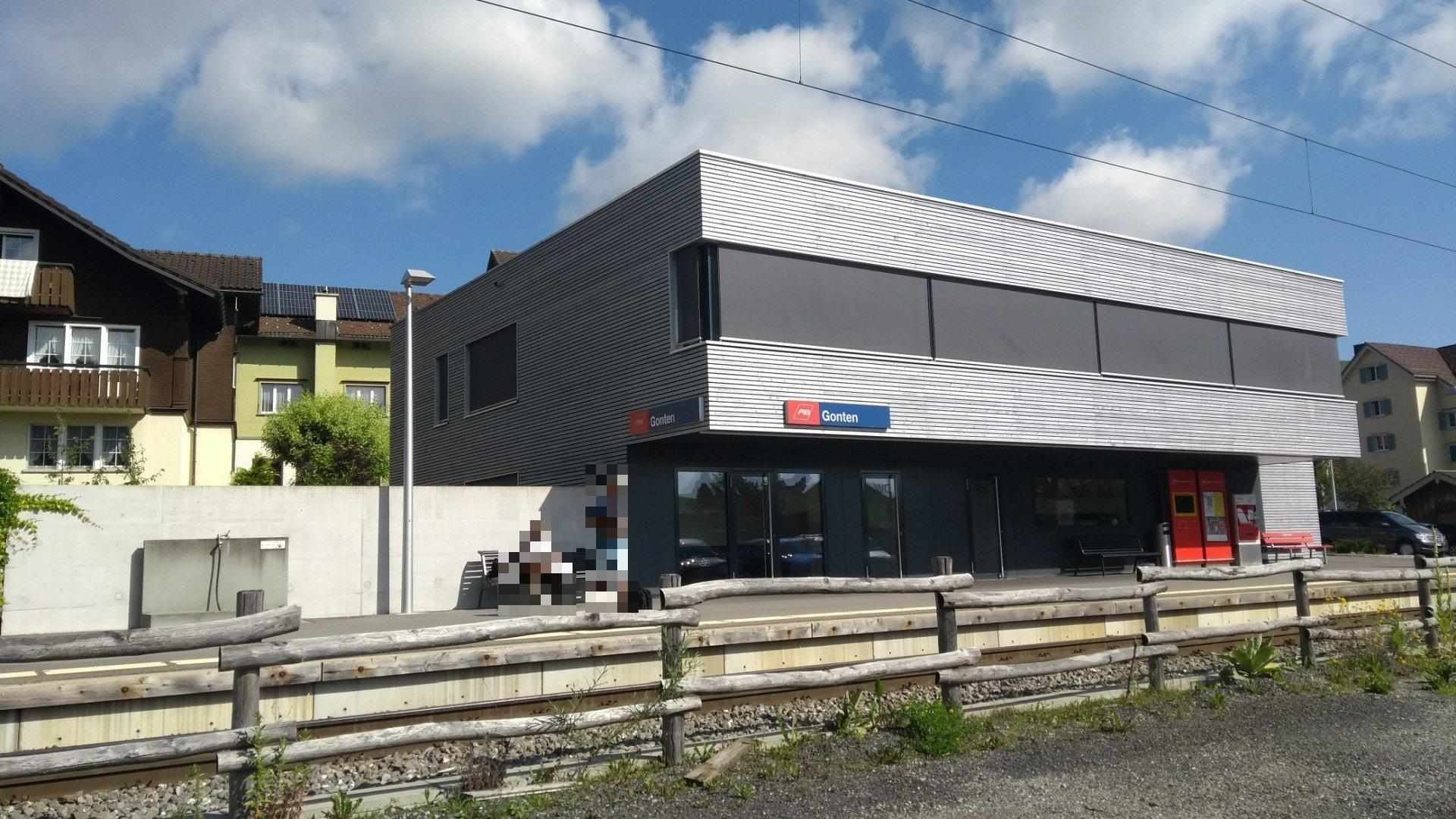
- The station building in 2018

General information
- Location: Gonten, Appenzell Innerrhoden; Switzerland
- Coordinates: 47°19′42″N 9°20′50″E
- Elevation: 900 m (3,000 ft)
- Owner: Appenzell Railways
- Line: Gossau–Wasserauen line
- Distance: 20.9 km (13.0 mi) from Gossau SG
- Platforms: 1 side platform
- Tracks: 1
- Train operators: Appenzell Railways

Other information
- Fare zone: 249 (Tarifverbund Ostwind)

Services
Preceding station	St. Gallen S-Bahn	Following station
Jakobsbad towards Gossau SG	S23	Gontenbad towards Wasserauen
Location
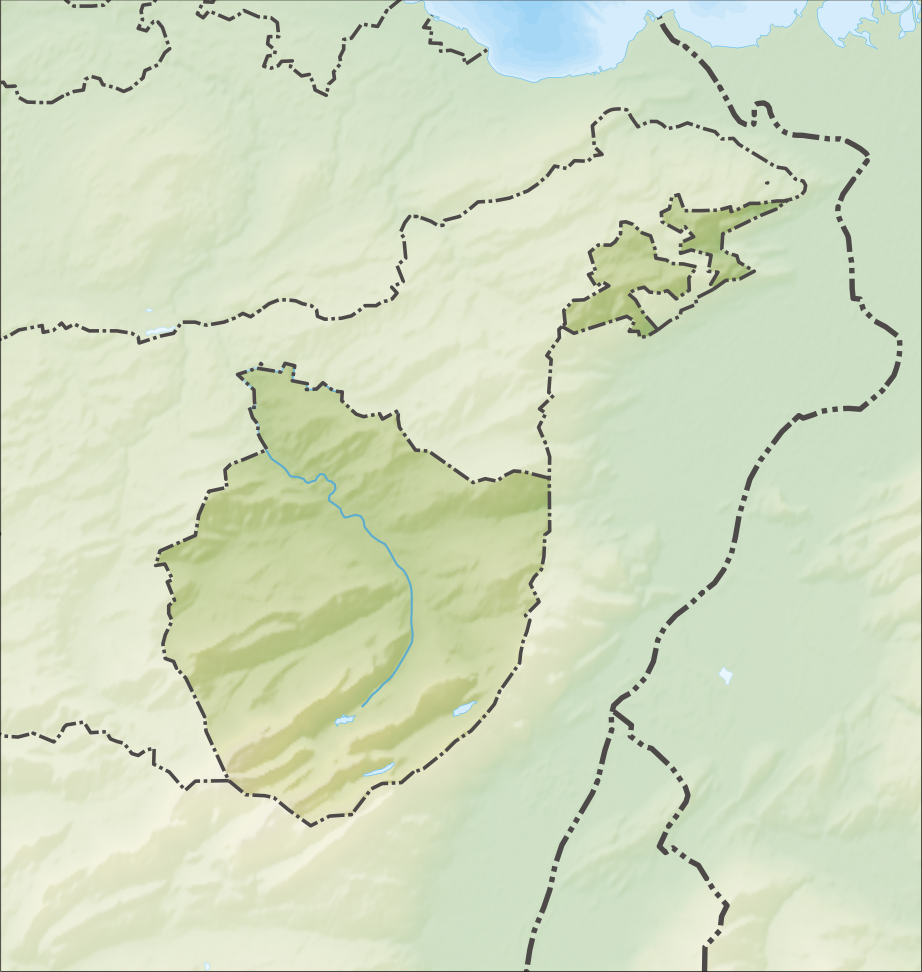
- Location within Switzerland Location within Canton of Appenzell Innerrhoden

Gonten railway station (German: Bahnhof Gonten) is a railway station in the district of Gonten, in the Swiss canton of Appenzell Innerrhoden. It is located on the 1,000 mm (3 ft 3 3/8 in) metre gauge Gossau–Wasserauen line of Appenzell Railways.

== History ==
The current square building was constructed between 2012 and 2016, replacing an older structure. The top floor contains doctors' offices. The station has a single side platform, 121 metres (397 ft) long.

== Services ==
As of the December 2020 timetable change, the following services stop at Gonten:

- St. Gallen S-Bahn: S23: half-hourly service between Gossau SG and Wasserauen.
