= Steinegg railway station =

Train station in Switzerland

Steinegg
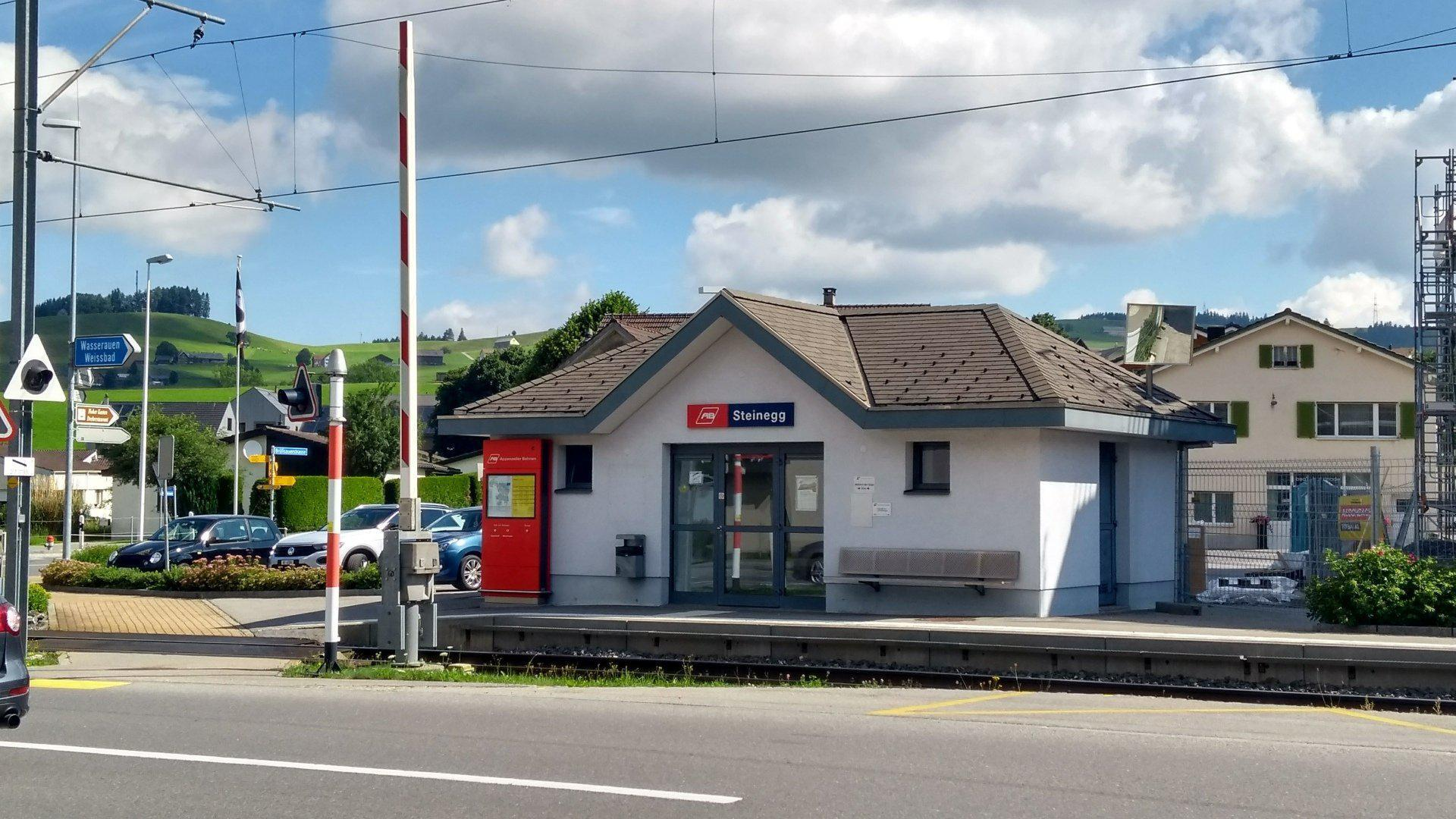
- The station building in 2018

General information
- Location: Rüte, Appenzell Innerrhoden; Switzerland
- Coordinates: 47°19′12″N 9°25′51″E
- Elevation: 801 m (2,628 ft)
- Owner: Appenzell Railways
- Line: Gossau–Wasserauen line
- Distance: 27.8 km (17.3 mi) from Gossau SG
- Platforms: 1 side platform
- Tracks: 1
- Train operators: Appenzell Railways

Other information
- Fare zone: 247 (Tarifverbund Ostwind)

Services
Preceding station	St. Gallen S-Bahn	Following station
Appenzell towards Gossau SG	S23	Weissbad towards Wasserauen
Location
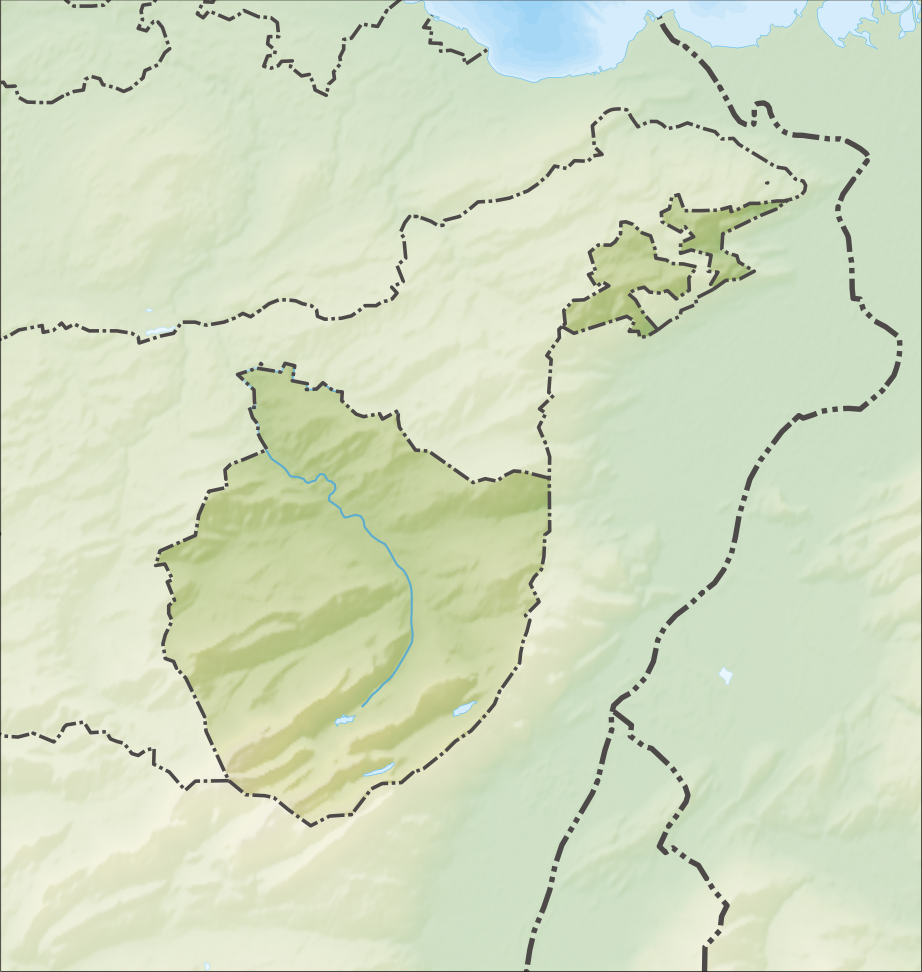
- Location within Switzerland Location within Canton of Appenzell Innerrhoden

Steinegg railway station (German: Bahnhof Steinegg) is a railway station in the district of Rüte, in the Swiss canton of Appenzell Innerrhoden. It is located on the 1,000 mm (3 ft 3 3/8 in) metre gauge Gossau–Wasserauen line of Appenzell Railways.

== Services ==
As of the December 2020 timetable change, the following services stop at Steinegg:

- St. Gallen S-Bahn: S23: half-hourly service between Gossau SG and Wasserauen.
