= Wilen railway station =

Railway station in Herisau, Appenzell Ausserrhoden, Switzerland

Wilen
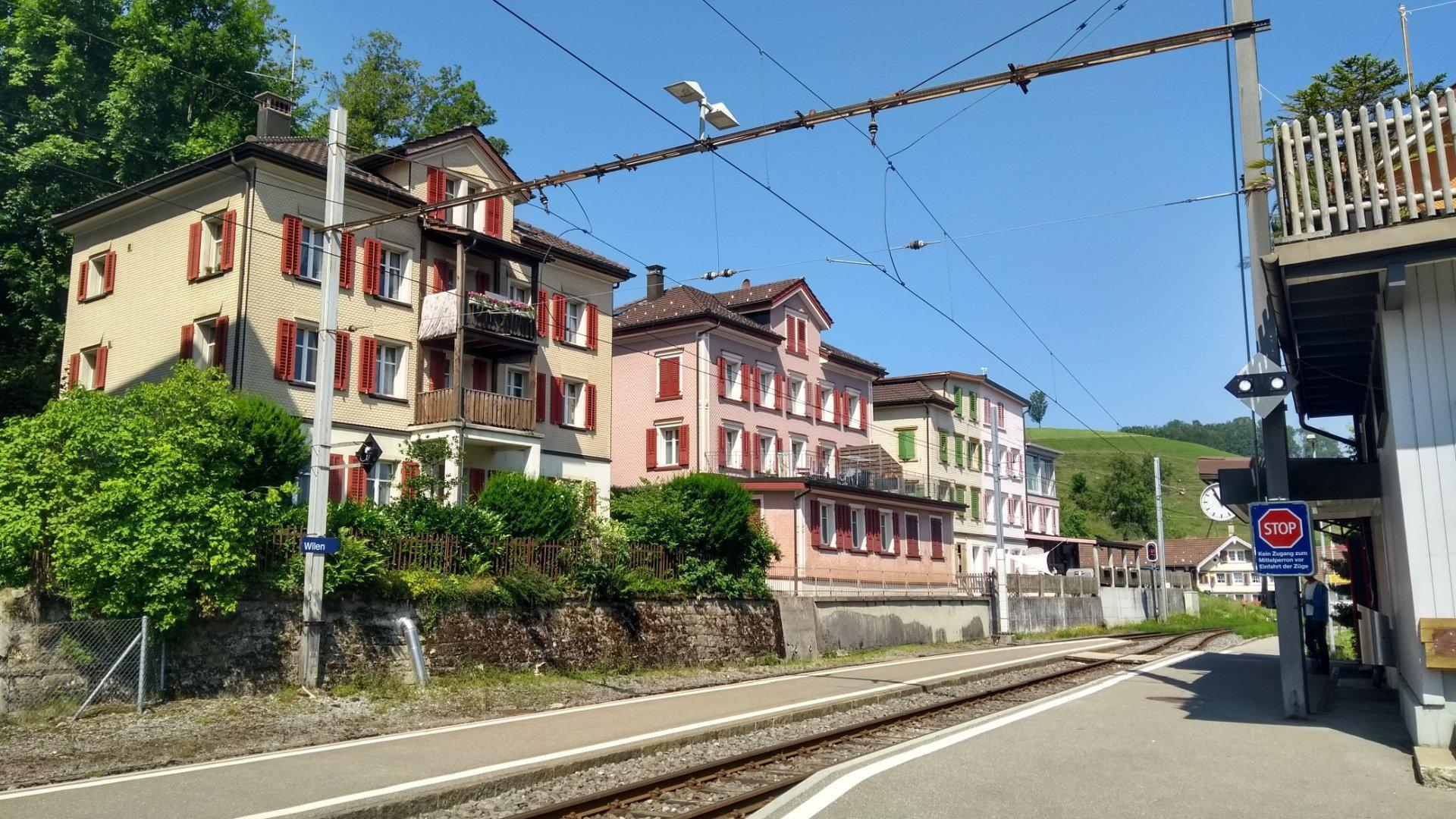
- The station platform in 2018

General information
- Location: Herisau, Appenzell Ausserrhoden; Switzerland
- Coordinates: 47°22′33″N 9°16′45″E
- Elevation: 759 m (2,490 ft)
- Owner: Appenzell Railways
- Line: Gossau–Wasserauen line
- Distance: 6.8 km (4.2 mi) from Gossau SG
- Platforms: 1 island platform; 1 side platform
- Tracks: 2
- Train operators: Appenzell Railways
- Connections: Regiobus bus lines

Other information
- Fare zone: 213 (Tarifverbund Ostwind)

Services
Preceding station	St. Gallen S-Bahn	Following station
Herisau towards Gossau SG	S23	Waldstatt towards Wasserauen
Location
- Location within Switzerland Location within Canton of Appenzell Ausserrhoden

Wilen railway station (German: Bahnhof Wilen), also known as Herisau Wilen, is a railway station in the municipality of Herisau, in the Swiss canton of Appenzell Ausserrhoden. It is located on the 1,000 mm (3 ft 3 3/8 in) metre gauge Gossau–Wasserauen line of Appenzell Railways.

== Services ==
As of the December 2020 timetable change, the following services stop at Wilen:

- St. Gallen S-Bahn: S23: half-hourly service between Gossau SG and Wasserauen.
