= Schwende railway station =

Train station in Switzerland

Schwende
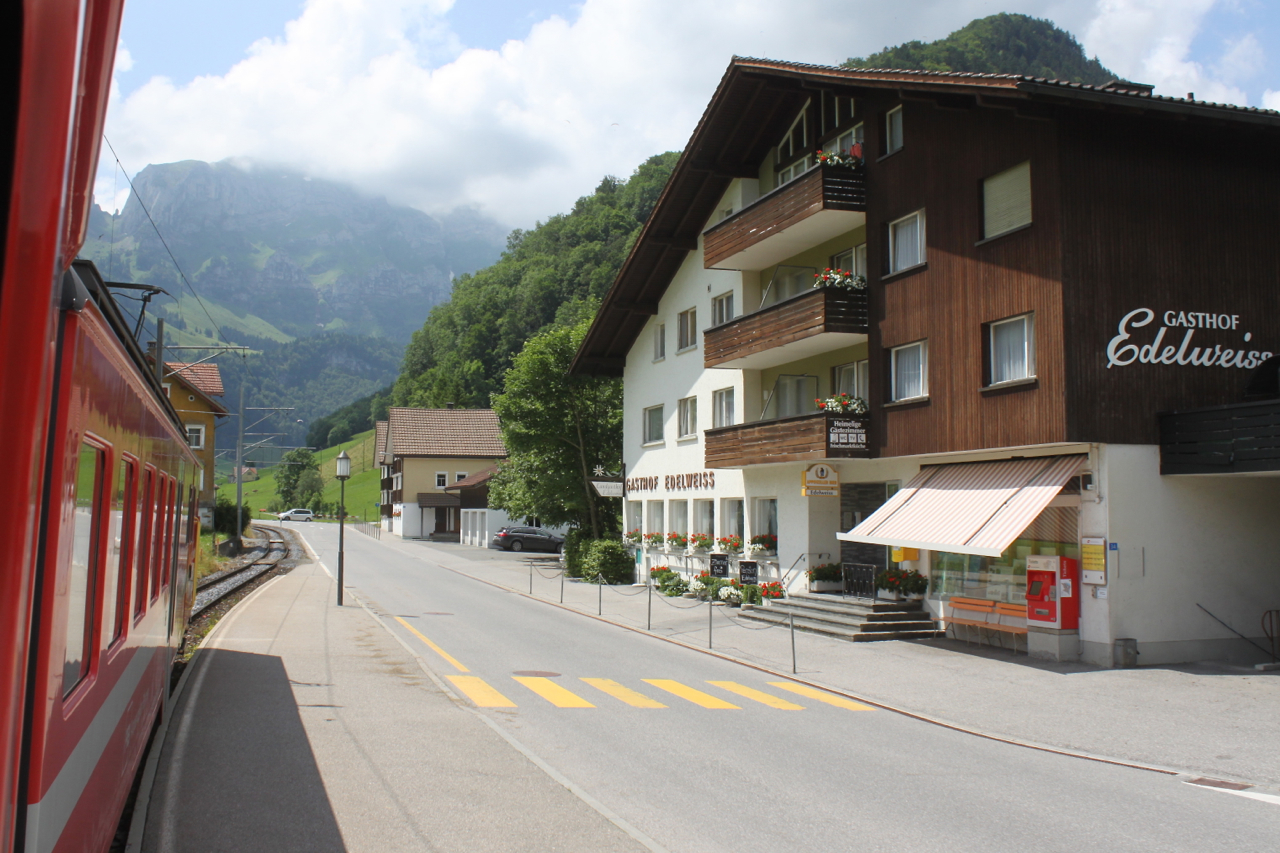
- A view from a train at the station in 2013

General information
- Location: Schwende, Appenzell Innerrhoden; Switzerland
- Coordinates: 47°18′00″N 9°26′08″E
- Elevation: 839 m (2,753 ft)
- Owner: Appenzell Railways
- Line: Gossau–Wasserauen line
- Distance: 30.4 km (18.9 mi) from Gossau SG
- Platforms: 1 side platform
- Tracks: 1
- Train operators: Appenzell Railways

Other information
- Fare zone: 248 (Tarifverbund Ostwind)

Services
Preceding station	St. Gallen S-Bahn	Following station
Weissbad towards Gossau SG	S23	Wasserauen Terminus
Location
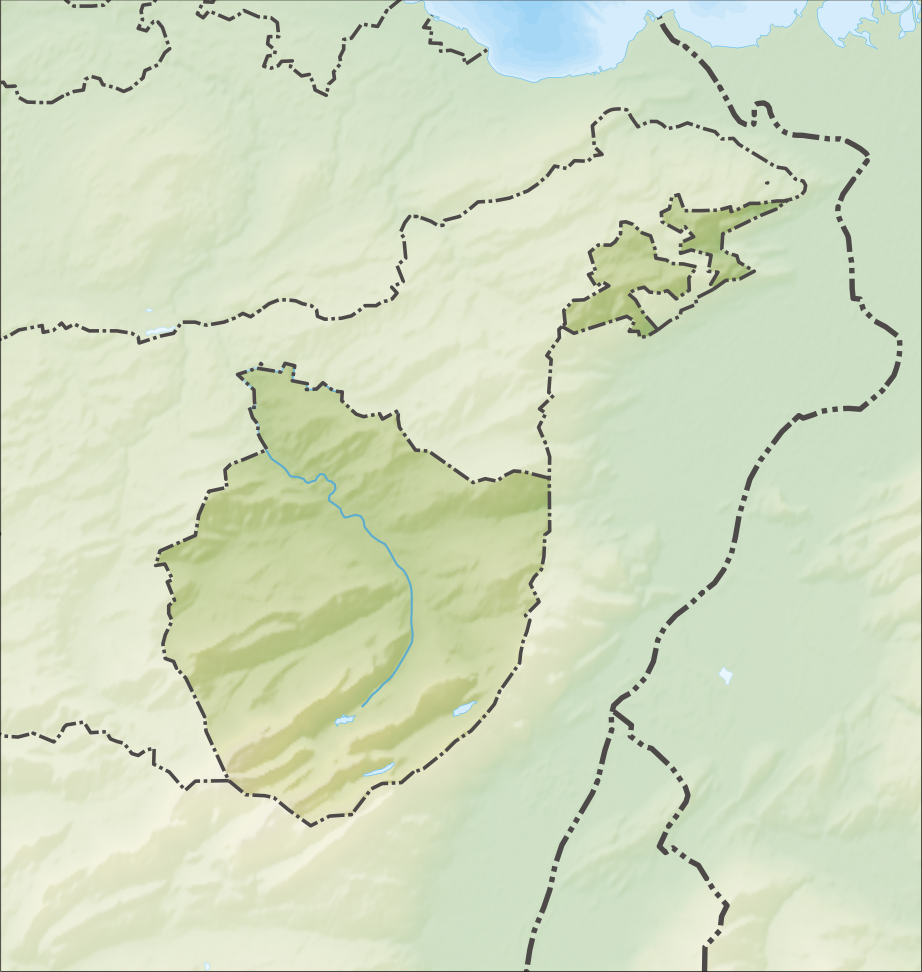
- Location within Switzerland Location within Canton of Appenzell Innerrhoden

Schwende railway station (German: Bahnhof Schwende) is a railway station in the district of Schwende, in the Swiss canton of Appenzell Innerrhoden. It is located on the 1,000 mm (3 ft 3 3/8 in) metre gauge Gossau–Wasserauen line of Appenzell Railways.

== Services ==
As of the December 2020 timetable change, the following services stop at Schwende:

- St. Gallen S-Bahn: S23: half-hourly service between Gossau SG and Wasserauen.
