= Gonten =

Gonten District Bezirk Gonten
- District
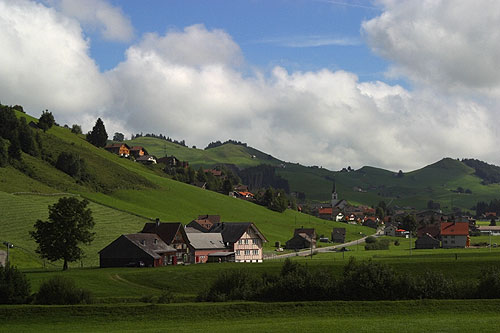

- Flag Coat of arms
- Coordinates: 47°19′N 9°20′E
- Country: Switzerland
- Canton: Appenzell Innerrhoden

Area
  - Total: 24.7 km^{2} (9.5 sq mi)
- Elevation: 902 m (2,959 ft)

Population (December 2020)
  - Total: 1,442
  - Density: 58.4/km^{2} (151/sq mi)
- Time zone: UTC+1 (CET)
  - Summer (DST): UTC+2 (CEST)
- Postal code: 9108
- SFOS number: 3102
- Municipalities: Appenzell Innerrhoden has no municipalities
- Website: http://www.gonten.ch

Gonten District is a district of the canton of Appenzell Innerrhoden in Switzerland.

== History ==
Gonten is first mentioned in 1200 as Gumbton. This refers to a pool of water, which points at the nearby peat-bog.

== Geography ==
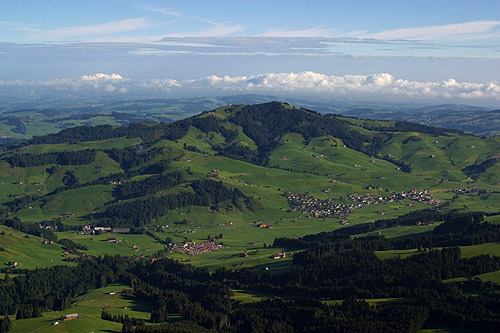
Gonten area

Aerial view by Walter Mittelholzer (1933)

Gonten has an area, as of 2011, of 24.7 square kilometers (9.5 sq mi). Of this area, 61.7% is used for agricultural purposes, while 32.0% is forested. Of the rest of the land, 4.9% is settled (buildings or roads) and 1.4% is unproductive land.

The district is located in the inner portion of the half canton. It consists of the linear village of Gonten and the hamlets of Gontenbad and Jakobsbad.

The municipality was formally established in 1872 when Gonten was joined with the rhodes Stechlenegg and Rinkenbach.

== Coat of arms ==
The blazon of the municipal coat of arms is Per pale Or and Gules two Pilgrim Sticks counterchanged and overall a Base Vert.

The bottom of the coat of arms is green. The background of the coat of arms is divided into red and gold. There are two pilgrim staffs, one each on the red and golden area respectively. A red staff is placed on the golden background, a golden one on the red background. The pilgrim staffs symbolize the apostle Jacob the elder. There is a chapel on the Kronberg mountain dedicated to Jacob the elder.

== Demographics ==
Gonten has a population (as of December 2020) of 1,442. As of 2008, 3.8% of the population are resident foreign nationals. Over the last 10 years (1999-2009) the population has changed at a rate of 0.1%. It has changed at a rate of 5.2% due to migration and at a rate of -0.1% due to births and deaths.

Most of the population (as of 2000) speaks German (1,353 or 98.1%), with Albanian being second most common (10 or 0.7%) and Serbo-Croatian being third (6 or 0.4%). There is 1 person who speaks French.

Of the population in the district 830 or about 60.2% were born in Gonten and lived there in 2000. There were 231 or 16.8% who were born in the same canton, while 254 or 18.4% were born somewhere else in Switzerland, and 48 or 3.5% were born outside of Switzerland.

In 2008 there were no live births to Swiss citizens and no deaths in the district. Ignoring immigration and emigration, the population of Swiss citizens remained the same while the foreign population remained the same. There was 1 Swiss man who immigrated back to Switzerland and 2 Swiss women who emigrated from Switzerland. At the same time, there were 3 non-Swiss men and 4 non-Swiss women who immigrated from another country to Switzerland. The total Swiss population change in 2008 (from all sources, including moves across municipal borders) was a decrease of 11 and the non-Swiss population increased by 11 people. This represents a population growth rate of 0.0%.

As of 2000, there were 688 people who were single and never married in the district. There were 574 married individuals, 96 widows or widowers and 21 individuals who are divorced.

As of 2000 the average number of residents per living room was 0.62 which is about equal to the cantonal average of 0.59 per room. In this case, a room is defined as space of a housing unit of at least 4 m^{2} (43 sq ft) as normal bedrooms, dining rooms, living rooms, kitchens and habitable cellars and attics. About 65.5% of the total households were owner occupied, or in other words did not pay rent (though they may have a mortgage or a rent-to-own agreement).

As of 2000, there were 447 private households in the district, and an average of 2.9 persons per household. There were 124 households that consist of only one person and 101 households with five or more people. Out of a total of 457 households that answered this question, 27.1% were households made up of just one person and there were 14 adults who lived with their parents. Of the rest of the households, there are 97 married couples without children, 188 married couples with children There were 17 single parents with a child or children. There were 7 households that were made up of unrelated people and 10 households that were made up of some sort of institution or another collective housing.

In 2000 there were 157 single family homes (or 36.9% of the total) out of a total of 425 inhabited buildings. There were 49 multi-family buildings (11.5%), along with 194 multi-purpose buildings that were mostly used for housing (45.6%) and 25 other use buildings (commercial or industrial) that also had some housing (5.9%). Of the single family homes 56 were built before 1919, while 17 were built between 1990 and 2000.

In 2000 there were 539 apartments in the district. The most common apartment size was 4 rooms of which there were 128. There were 15 single room apartments and 245 apartments with five or more rooms. Of these apartments, a total of 432 apartments (80.1% of the total) were permanently occupied, while 81 apartments (15.0%) were seasonally occupied and 26 apartments (4.8%) were empty. As of 2009, the construction rate of new housing units was 2.8 new units per 1000 residents. The vacancy rate for the district, in 2010, was 1.03%.

The historical population is given in the following chart:

== Heritage sites of national significance ==
The Bürgerhaus Roothuus is listed as a Swiss heritage site of national significance.

== Politics ==
In the 2007 federal election the CVP received 81.9% of the vote. In the federal election, a total of 226 votes were cast, and the voter turnout was 21.1%.

== Economy ==
As of 2010, Gonten had an unemployment rate of 0.3%. As of 2008, there were 200 people employed in the primary economic sector and about 94 businesses involved in this sector. 125 people were employed in the secondary sector and there were 15 businesses in this sector. 234 people were employed in the tertiary sector, with 40 businesses in this sector. There were 675 residents of the district who were employed in some capacity, of which females made up 38.2% of the workforce.

In 2008 the total number of full-time equivalent jobs was 440. The number of jobs in the primary sector was 148, all of which were in agriculture. The number of jobs in the secondary sector was 112 of which 80 or (71.4%) were in manufacturing and 32 (28.6%) were in construction. The number of jobs in the tertiary sector was 180. In the tertiary sector; 32 or 17.8% were in the sale or repair of motor vehicles, 20 or 11.1% were in the movement and storage of goods, 45 or 25.0% were in a hotel or restaurant, 6 or 3.3% were the insurance or financial industry, 6 or 3.3% were technical professionals or scientists, 9 or 5.0% were in education and 37 or 20.6% were in health care.

In 2000, there were 131 workers who commuted into the district and 311 workers who commuted away. The district is a net exporter of workers, with about 2.4 workers leaving the district for every one entering. Of the working population, 5.8% used public transportation to get to work, and 44% used a private car.

== Transport ==
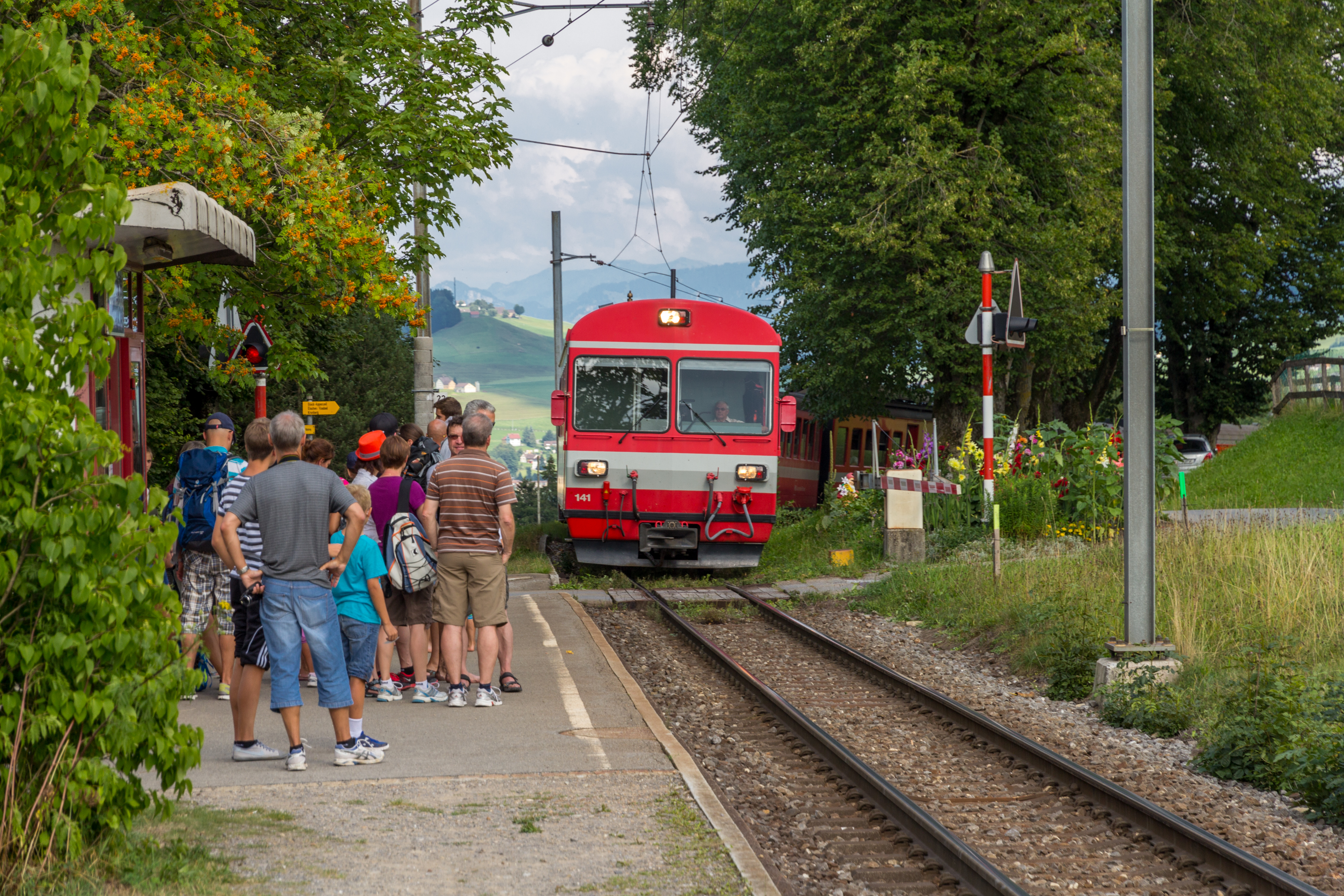
Regional train arriving Gontenbad railway station

The district has three railway stations: Gonten, Jakobsbad, and Gontenbad. All three are located on the Gossau–Wasserauen line, operated by Appenzell Railways.

== Religion ==
From the 2000 census, 1,245 or 90.3% were Roman Catholic, while 78 or 5.7% belonged to the Swiss Reformed Church. Of the rest of the population, there were 3 members of an Orthodox church (or about 0.22% of the population), and there were 7 individuals (or about 0.51% of the population) who belonged to another Christian church. There were 15 (or about 1.09% of the population) who were Islamic. 22 (or about 1.60% of the population) belonged to no church, are agnostic or atheist, and 9 individuals (or about 0.65% of the population) did not answer the question.

== Education ==
In Gonten about 389 or (28.2%) of the population have completed non-mandatory upper secondary education, and 75 or (5.4%) have completed additional higher education (either University or a Fachhochschule). Of the 75 who completed tertiary schooling, 74.7% were Swiss men, 14.7% were Swiss women, 8.0% were non-Swiss men.

As of 2000, there was one student in Gonten who came from another district, while 116 residents attended schools outside the district.
