= Gossau–Wasserauen railway line =

Narrow gauge railway line in Switzerland

Gossau–Wasserauen railway (S23)
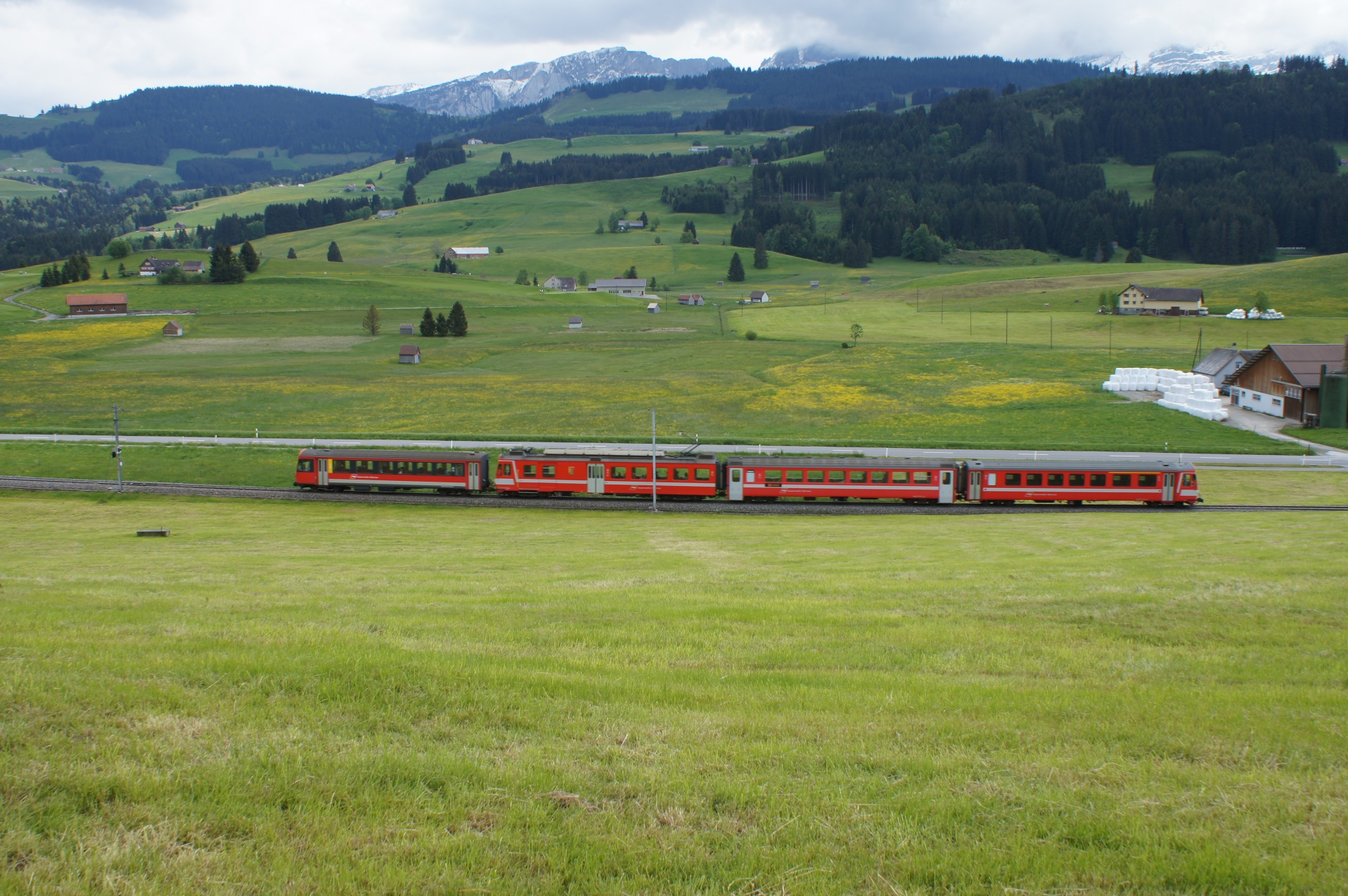
- Train on the Appenzell Railways operated by BDe 4/4 II 43 railcar near Gonten.

Overview
- Locale: Switzerland

Service
- Route number: 854

Technical
- Line length: 32.10
- Track gauge: 1,000 mm (3 ft 3 3/8 in) metre gauge
- Electrification: 1500 V DC overhead catenary
- Maximum incline: 3.7%

The Gossau–Wasserauen railway line is a metre-gauge adhesion railway of the Appenzell Railways (Appenzeller Bahnen; AB). It runs from Gossau via Appenzell to Wasserauen in Switzerland and is given the abbreviation of GAW by the operator. The connection was built and electrified in several stages by different companies and has been operating continuously since 1949.

== History ==
The line was developed in the following stages:

- Gossau SG–Herisau, opened on 1 October 1913 by the Appenzell Railways (Appenzeller Bahn, which has been called the Appenzeller Bahnen since 1988), replacing the St. Gallen Winkeln–Herisau section, opened on 12 April 1875
- Herisau–Urnäsch, opened on 21 September 1875 by the Schweizerische Gesellschaft für Localbahnen (Swiss company for local railways; called the Appenzell Railway from 1885)
- Urnäsch–Appenzell, opened on 16 August (to Gontenbad) and 29 October 1886 by the Appenzell Railway
- Gossau SG–Appenzell has been operated electrically with 1500 volts DC since 23 April 1933
- Appenzell–Wasserauen, opened on 13 July 1912 by the Säntisbahn (Säntis Railway) and initially electrified at 1000 volts DC; converted to 1500 volts DC by the Appenzell Railway to allow through operations on 22 April 1949
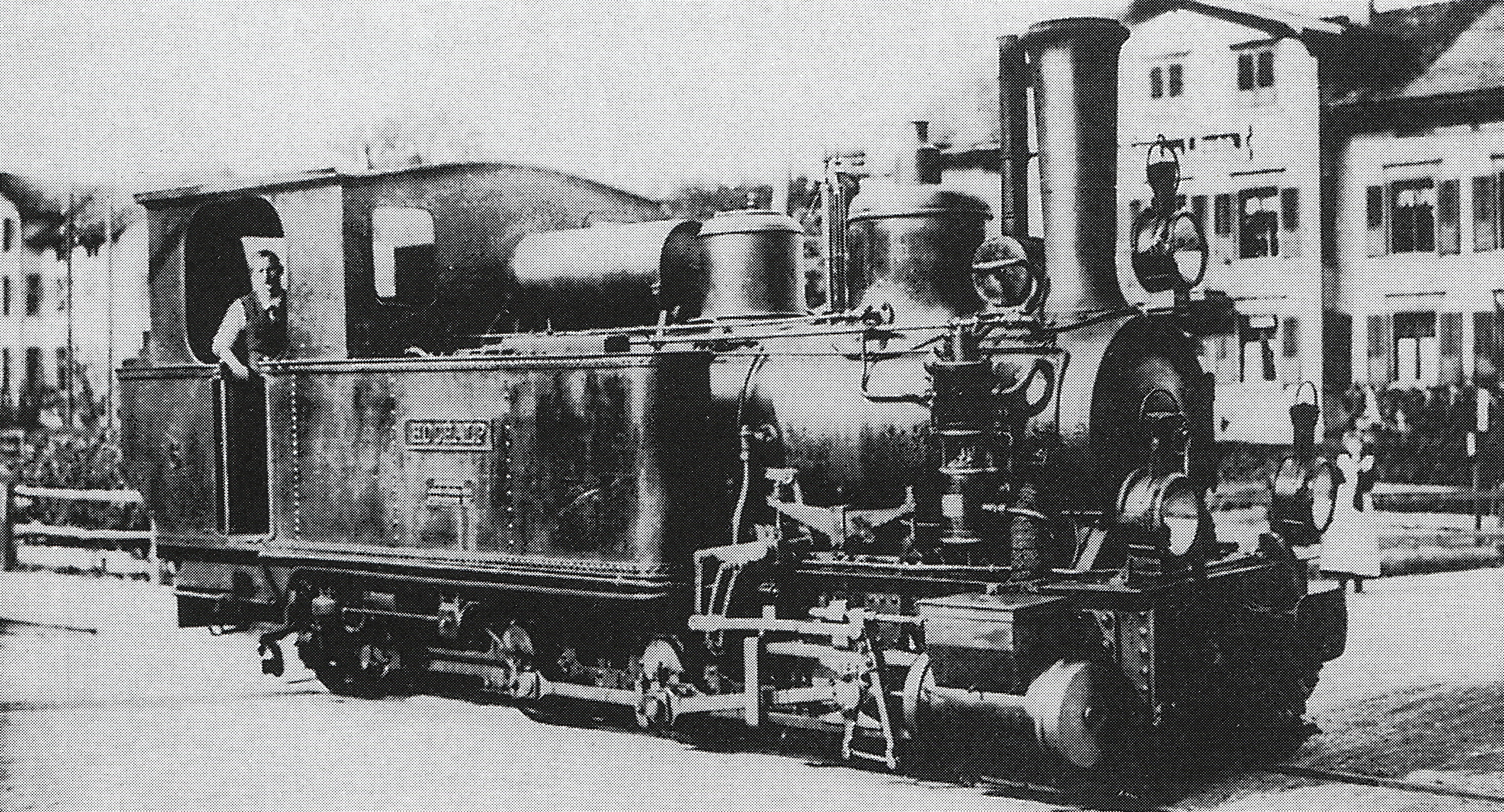
Steam locomotive G 3/4 "Hochalp" of the Appenzell Railway built in 1887

In order to be able to carry standard-gauge wagons on the metre-gauge network, a Rollbock system was opened in Gossau on 1 July 1978, allowing operations on the Gossau–Wasserauen route. Rollbock operations were extended on the Appenzell–Gais–Teufen route from 1989. Goods traffic ended by the end of 2003 and the Rollbock system was taken out of service on 1 August 2010.

== Operation ==
S23

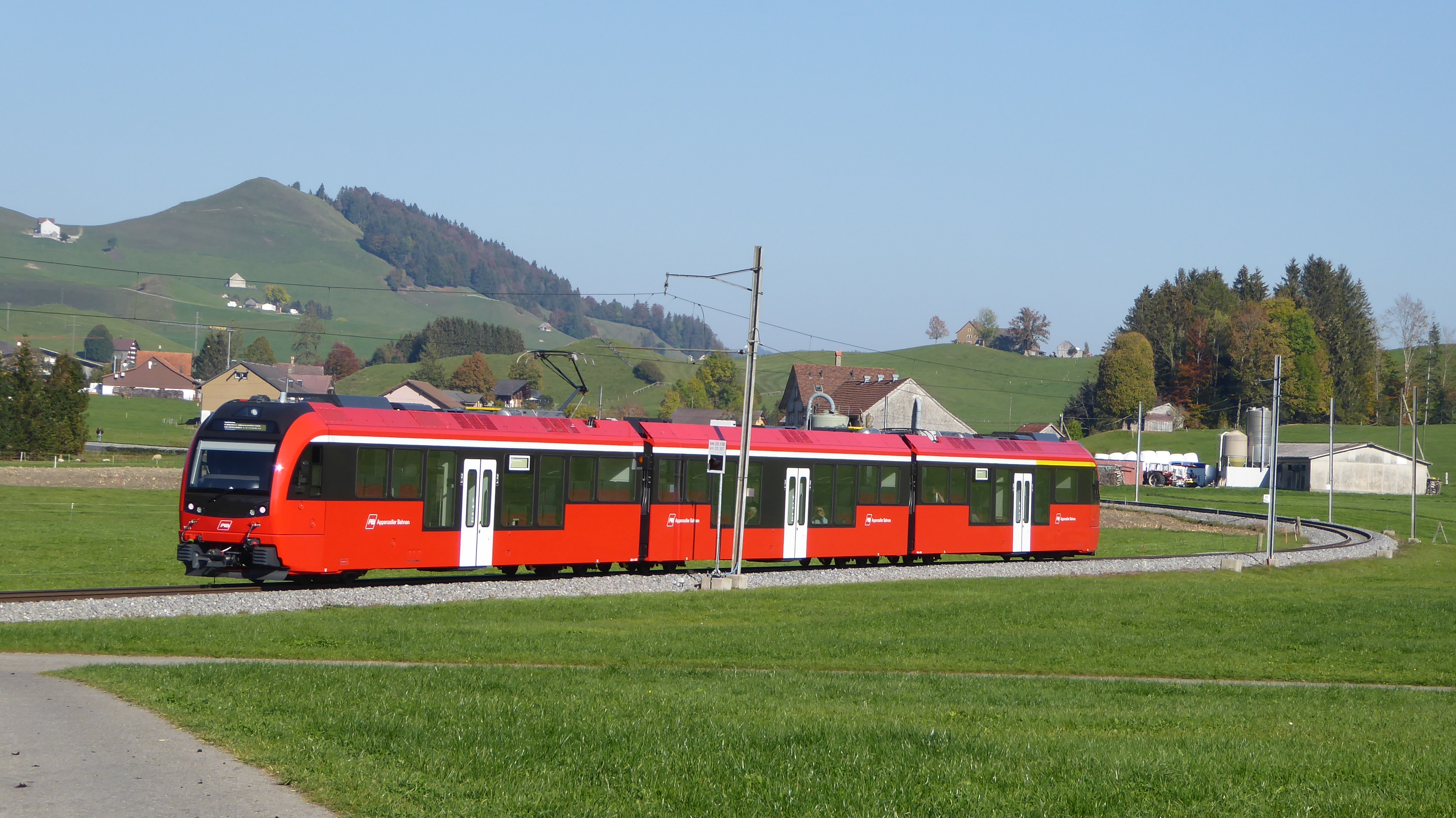
- AB ABe 4-12 near Gonten

Overview
- Service type: St. Gallen S-Bahn service (also included in the Bodensee S-Bahn)
- Current operator: Appenzell Railways (AB)

Route
- Termini: Gossau SG; Wasserauen
- Stops: 12
- Service frequency: Every 30 minutes

Technical
- Rolling stock: Class ABe 4-12 EMUs

As of the December 2021 timetable change, Appenzell Railways operates half-hourly service between Gossau SG and Wasserauen. This is designated as line S23 of the St. Gallen S-Bahn. The S23 is also part of the Bodensee S-Bahn.

In addition to regular station stops, the S23 stops on request at Gonten Alpsteinblick, between Jakobsbad and Gontenbad, to serve the Alpsteinblick ski lift.

== Route ==
S23 Gossau SG – Herisau – Appenzell – Wasserauen

- Gossau SG (junction with the St. Gallen–Winterthur railway)
- Herisau (junction with the Bodensee–Toggenburg railway)
- Herisau Wilen (stops only on request)
- Waldstatt
- Zürchersmühle (stops only on request)
- Urnäsch
- Jakobsbad (stops only on request)
- Gonten (stops only on request)
- Gontenbad (stops only on request)
- Appenzell (junction with the Appenzell–St. Gallen–Trogen railway)
- Steinegg (stops only on request)
- Weissbad
- Schwende (stops only on request)
- Wasserauen
