= Schwägalp Pass =

Mountain pass in the Swiss Alps

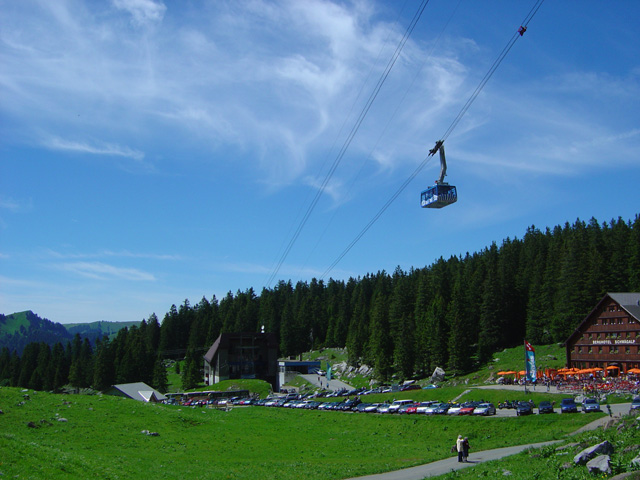
- Aerial tramway up Säntis from Schwägalp

- Location within Alps Location within Switzerland Location within Canton of Appenzell Ausserrhoden
- Elevation: 1,278 metres (4,193 ft)
- Traversed by: Road

Third Approach
- Location: Eastern Switzerland
- Range: Alps
- Coordinates: 47°15′42″N 09°19′50″E

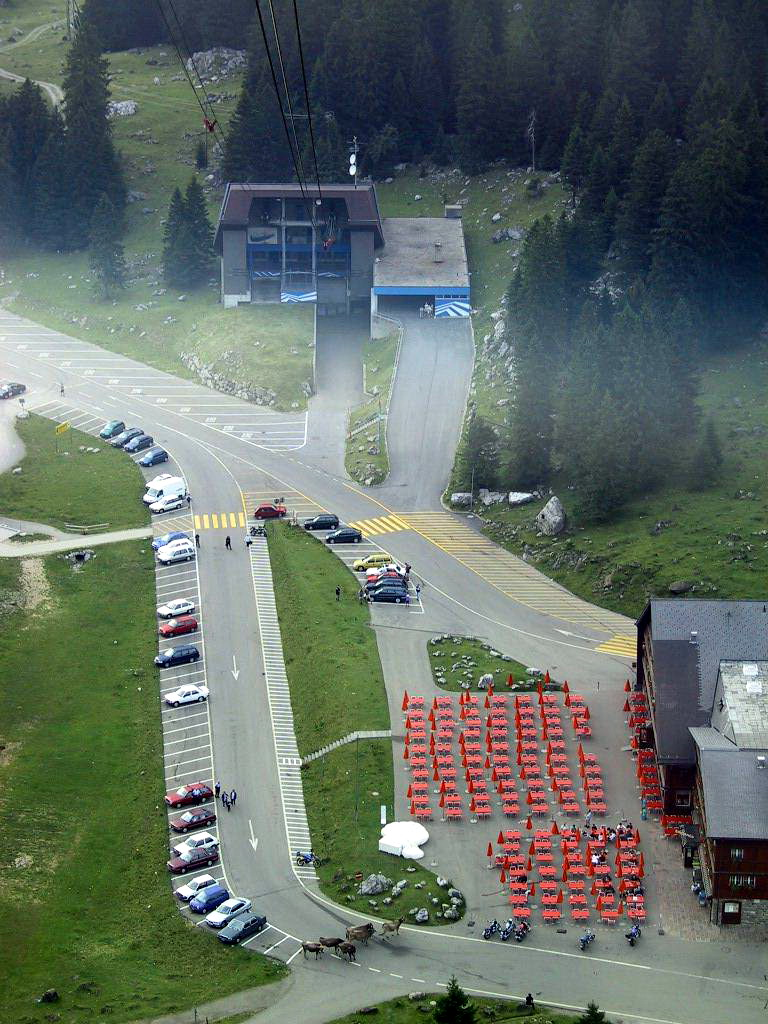
Schwägalp seen from Säntis cableway

Schwägalp Pass (el. 1,278 m or 4,193 ft) is a high mountain pass in the Appenzell Alps between the cantons of St. Gallen and Appenzell Ausserrhoden in Switzerland.

The pass is named after the Schwägalp peak (el. 1,360 m or 4,462 ft) on the north face of Säntis (el. 2,502 m or 8,209 ft). The pass road has a maximum grade of 12 percent (12%).

== Transport ==
Schwägalp peak is the starting point of an aerial tram to the top of Säntis. It was built in 1935.

The pass lies on a road between Nesslau-Neu St. Johann in the Toggenburg region of the canton of St. Gallen and Urnäsch in Appenzell Ausserrhoden. PostBus Switzerland buses use this road, connecting Schwägalp peak to both Urnäsch railway station and Nesslau-Neu St. Johann railway station.

== See also ==
- List of highest paved roads in Europe
- List of mountain passes
- List of the highest Swiss passes
- Tourism in Switzerland
