= Valley station =

The valley station is the lower terminal of an aerial lift, cable car, gondola lift, chairlift, rack railway or ski lift. The valley station is the counterpart of a top station. Cable cars may be boarded at both stations. The valley station is always at a lower elevation than the top station.

Valley stations on a cable car may be ordinary buildings with a docking bay or open steel structures. They are oriented in the direction of the cables. Gondola lifts, by contrast always have horizontally-oriented valley stations.

== Gallery ==
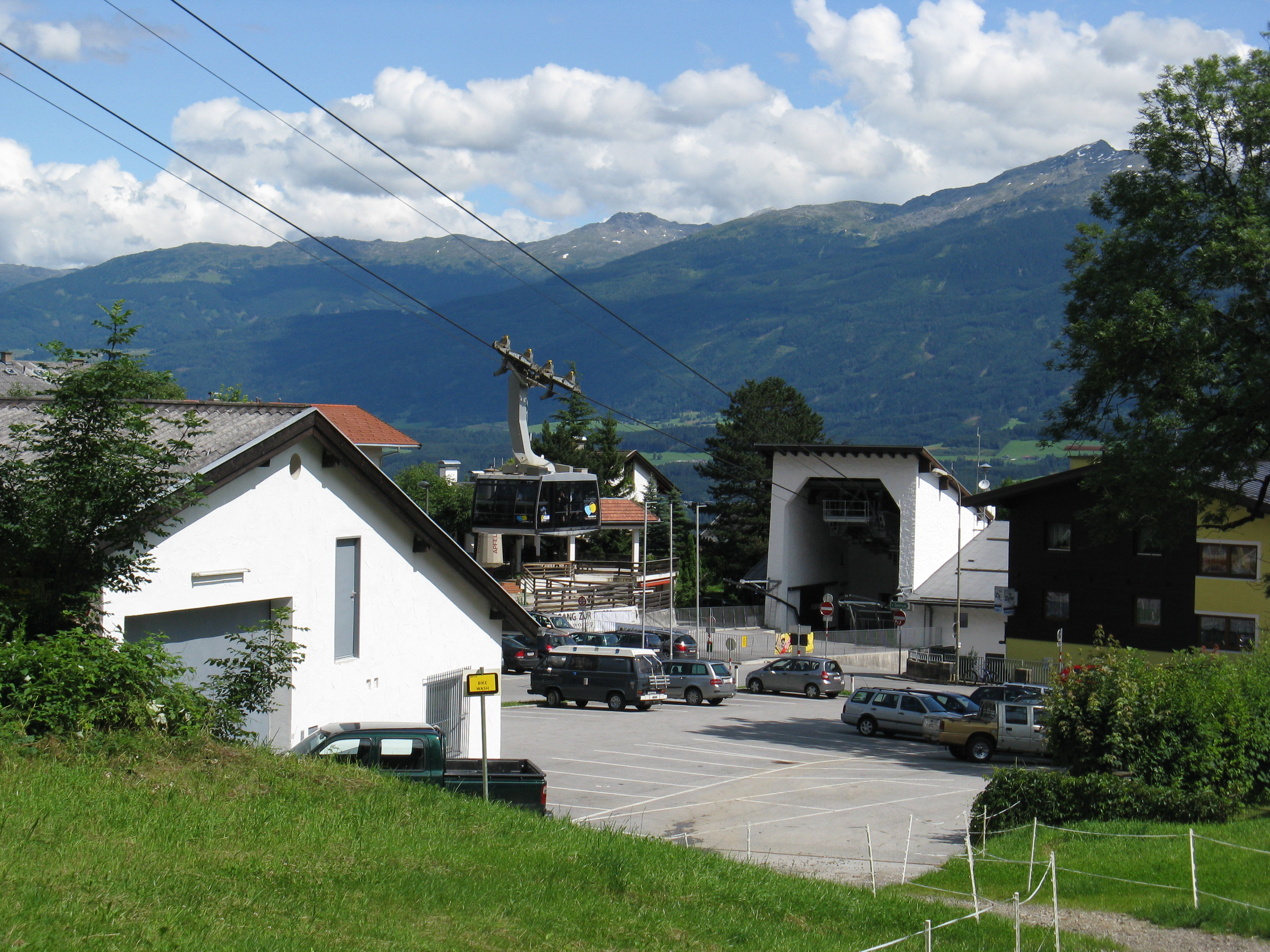
Hungerburg station on the Nordkettenbahn, Innsbruck

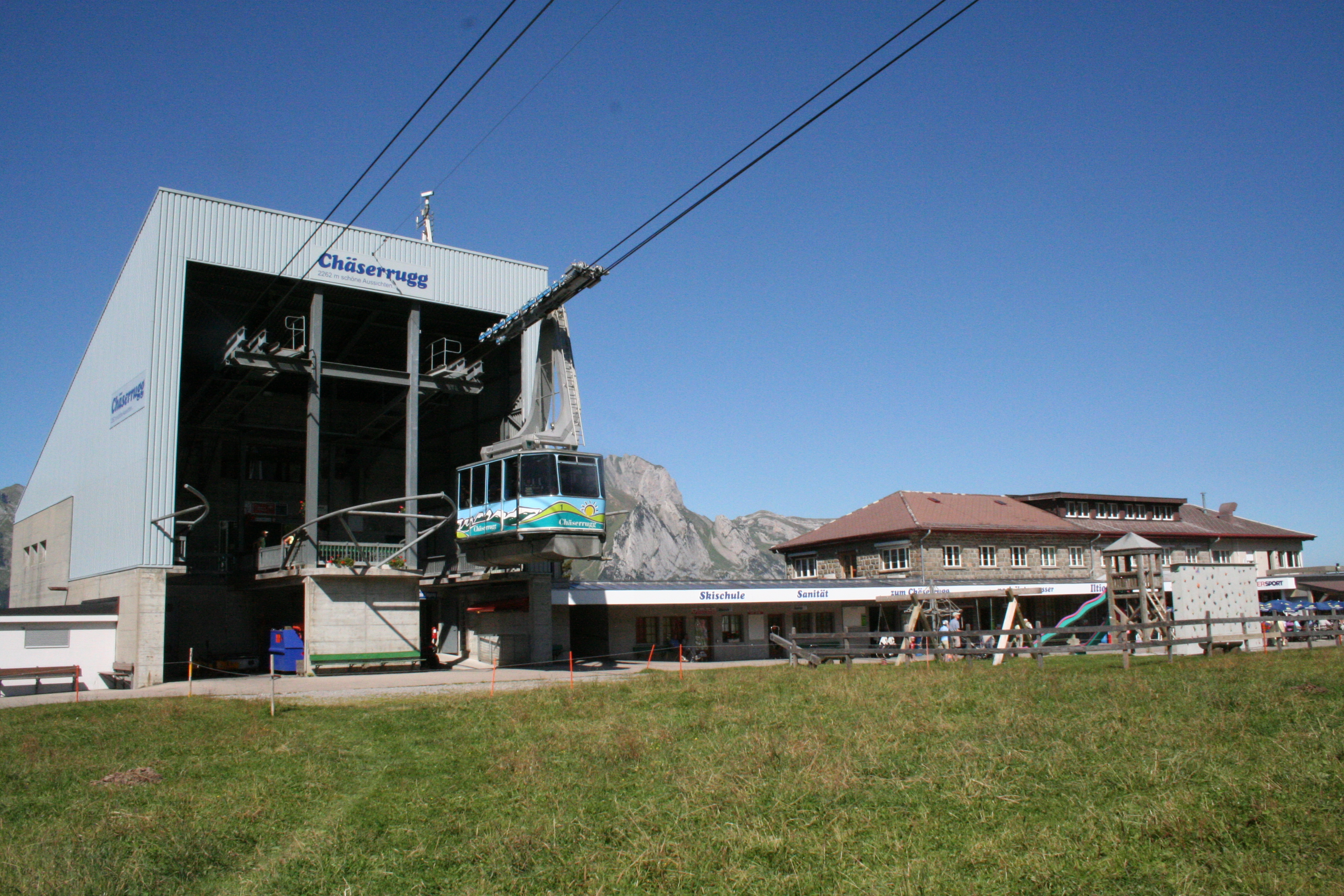
Chäserrugg cable car, Unterwasser, Canton of St. Gallen, Switzerland

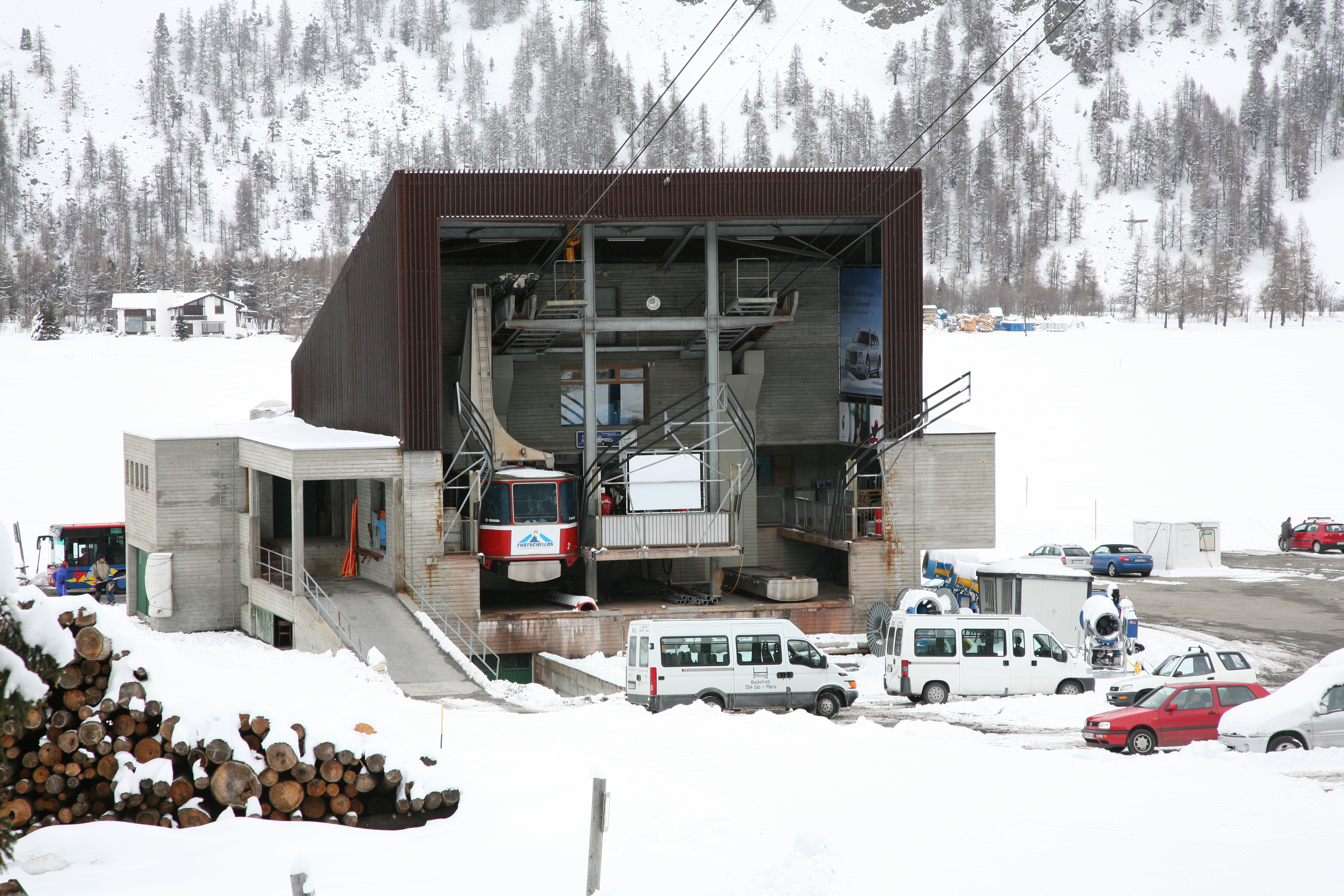
Furtschellas, Engadin, Switzerland

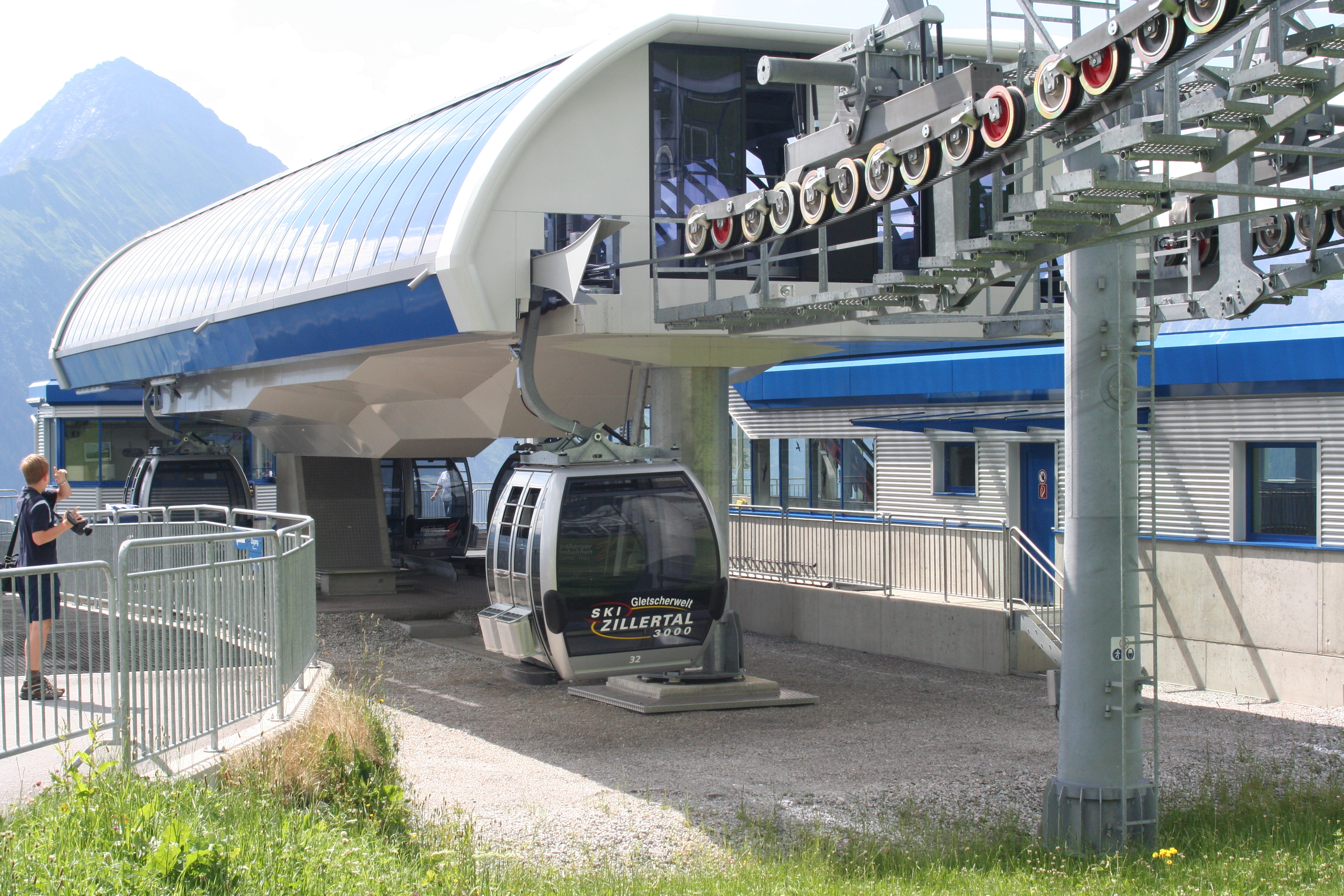
Finkenberg gondola lift, Zillertal, Austria

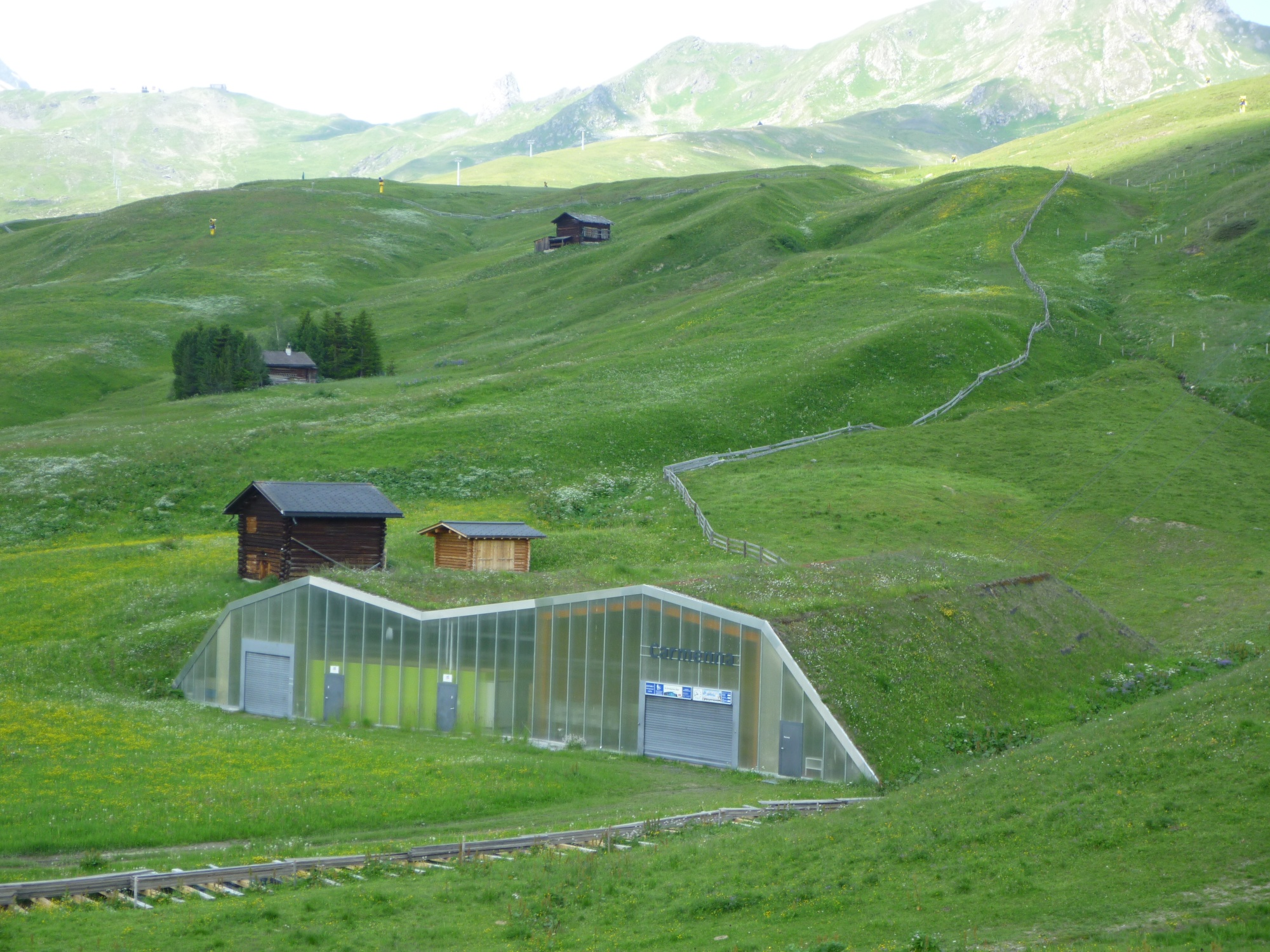
[Carmenna Chairlift, Arosa, Italy

== Examples ==
Name	Valley station:	Top station:
Klewenalpbahn	Beckenried (420 m)	Klewenalp (1590 m)
Titlisbahn	Engelberg (1000 m)	Titlis (3020 m)
Säntisbahn	Schwägalp (1345 m)	Säntis (2503 m)
Klein Matterhorn-Bahn	Zermatt (1619 m)	Klein Matterhorn (3885 m)
Stockhornbahn	Erlenbach (720 m)	Stockhorn (2190 m)
Weisshornbahn	Obersee Arosa (1750 m)	Weisshorn (2650 m)
