= Wasserauen railway station =

Train station in Switzerland

Wasserauen
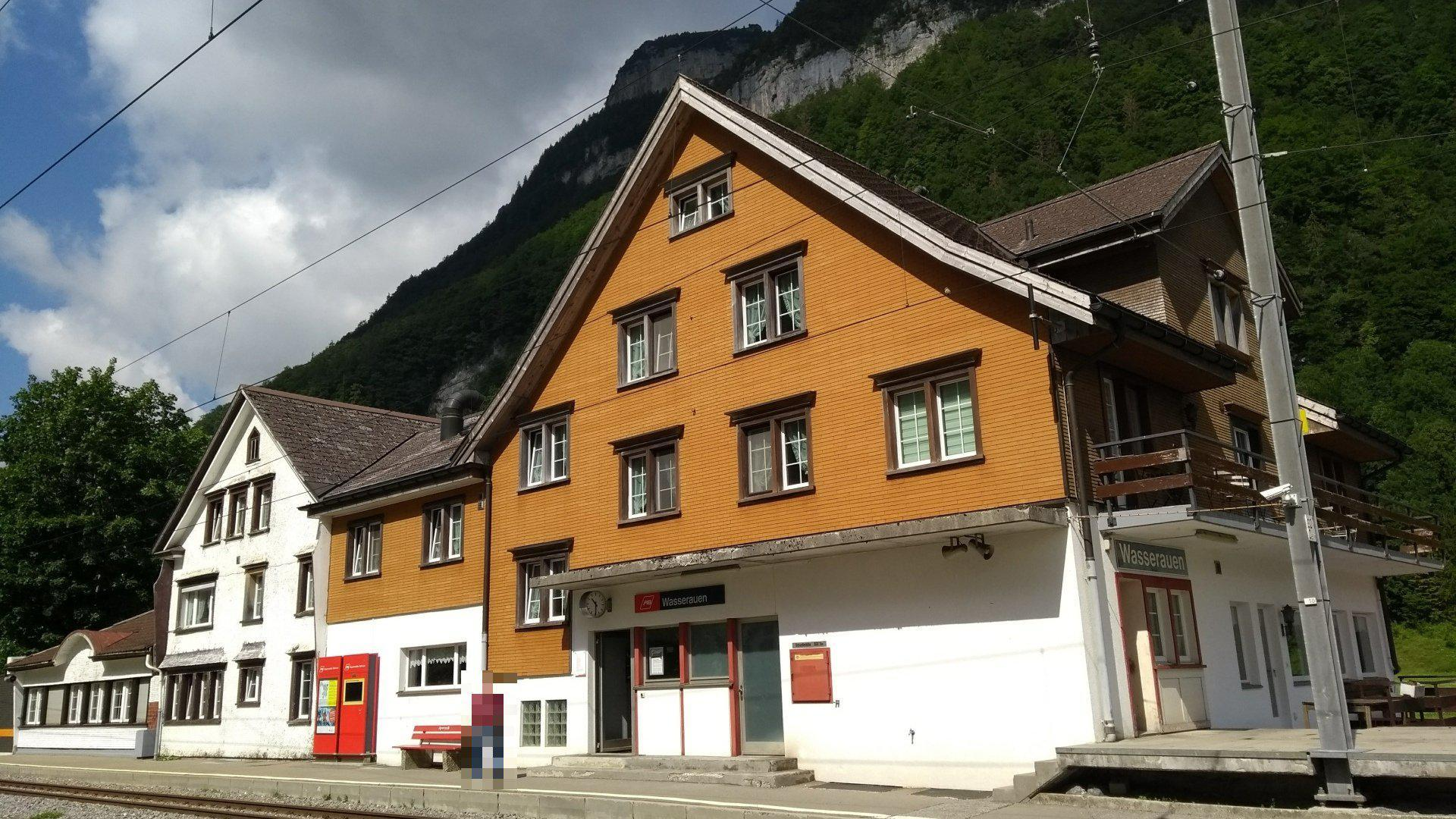
- The station building in 2018

General information
- Location: Wasserauen, Schwende-Rüte, Appenzell Innerrhoden; Switzerland
- Coordinates: 47°17′08″N 9°25′43″E
- Elevation: 869 m (2,851 ft)
- Owner: Appenzell Railways
- Line: Gossau–Wasserauen line
- Distance: 32.1 km (19.9 mi) from Gossau SG
- Train operators: Appenzell Railways
- Connections: Luftseilbahn Wasserauen–Ebenalp

Other information
- Fare zone: 248 (Tarifverbund Ostwind)

Services
Preceding station	St. Gallen S-Bahn	Following station
Schwende towards Gossau SG	S23	Terminus
Location
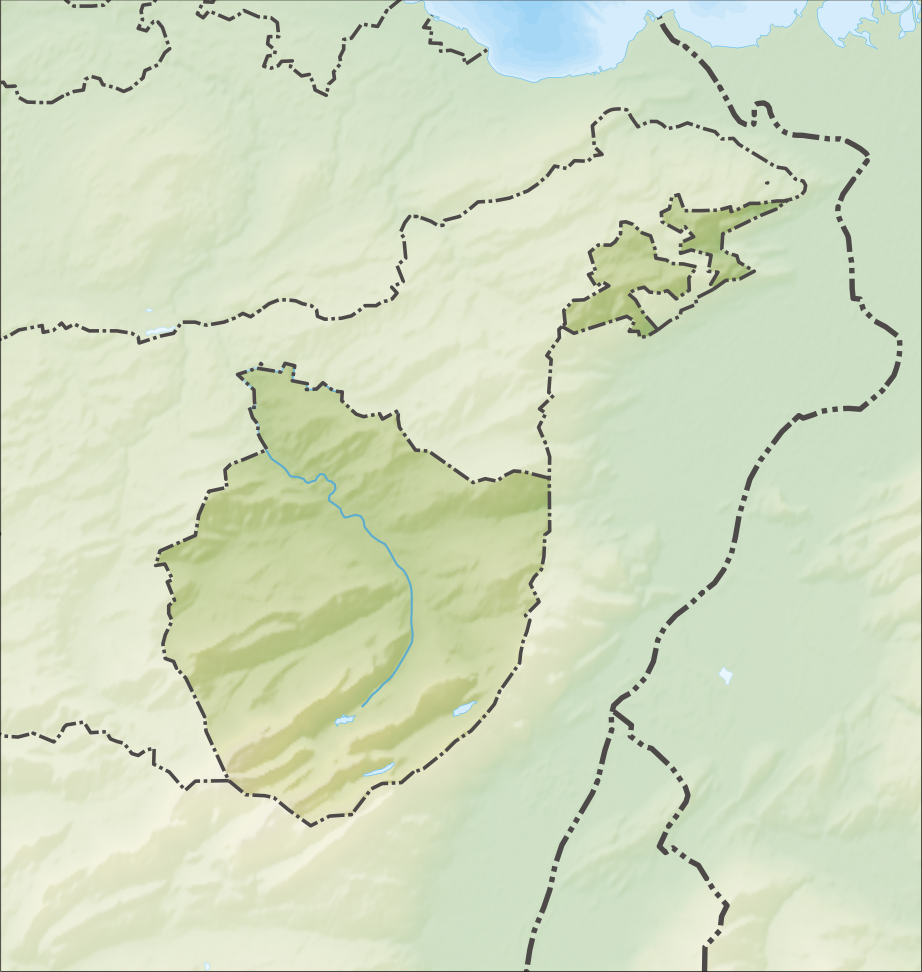
- Location within Switzerland Location within Canton of Appenzell Innerrhoden

Wasserauen railway station (German: Bahnhof Wasserauen) is a railway station in Wasserauen in the district of Schwende-Rüte, in the Swiss canton of Appenzell Innerrhoden. It is located on the 1,000 mm (3 ft 3 3/8 in) metre gauge Gossau–Wasserauen line of Appenzell Railways.

== Services ==
As of the December 2021 timetable change, the following services stop at Wasserauen:

- St. Gallen S-Bahn / Bodensee S-Bahn: S23: half-hourly service to Gossau SG via Appenzell.

Connections to long-distance services exist in Herisau (for St. Gallen/Lucerne) and Gossau SG (for Winterthur and Zürich HB).

The valley station of the Luftseilbahn Wasserauen–Ebenalp, which carries passengers up to Ebenalp, is located across the street from the station.

== See also ==
- Rail transport in Switzerland
