= Gossau SG railway station =

Railway station in Switzerland

Gossau SG
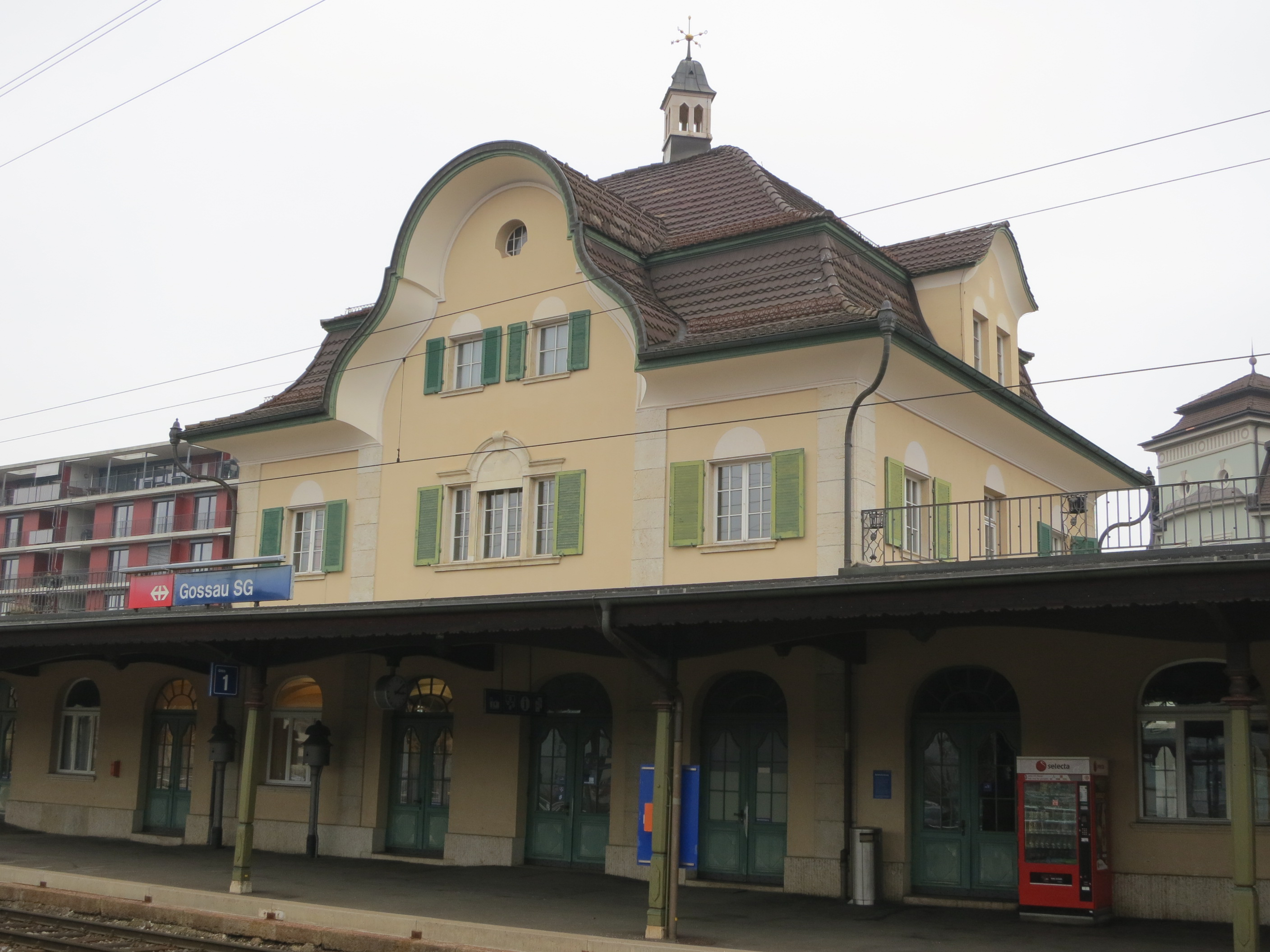
- The Gossau station building in 2013

General information
- Location: Gossau; Switzerland
- Coordinates: 47°24′42″N 9°15′11″E
- Elevation: 637 m (2,090 ft)
- Lines: St. Gallen–Winterthur line; Sulgen–Gossau line; Gossau–Wasserauen line
- Distance: 23.0 km (14.3 mi) from Sulgen; 90.1 km (56.0 mi) from Sargans
- Platforms: 2 island platforms
- Tracks: 4
- Train operators: Swiss Federal Railways; Thurbo; Appenzell Railways
- Connections
- Bus: PostAuto Schweiz 727; RegioBus 151 152 155 159

Other information
- Fare zone: 212 (Tarifverbund Ostwind)

Passengers
- 2018: 9,100 per weekday (except the S23)

Services
Preceding station	SBB CFF FFS	Following station
Flawil towards Geneva Airport	IC 1	St. Gallen Terminus
Flawil towards Zürich HB	IR 13	St. Gallen towards Sargans
Preceding station	St. Gallen S-Bahn	Following station
Flawil towards Wil	S1	St. Gallen Winkeln towards Schaffhausen
Arnegg towards Weinfelden	S5	St. Gallen Winkeln towards St. Margrethen
Terminus	S23	Herisau towards Wasserauen
Flawil towards Winterthur	SN21 Limited service	St. Gallen Winkeln towards St. Gallen
Flawil towards Winterthur	SN22 Limited service	St. Gallen Winkeln towards Heerbrugg
Location
- Location within Switzerland Location within Canton of St. Gallen

Gossau SG railway station (German: Bahnhof Gossau SG) is a railway station in Gossau, in the Swiss canton of St. Gallen. It is an intermediate station on the St. Gallen–Winterthur line and the terminus of the Sulgen–Gossau and 1,000 mm (3 ft 3 3/8 in) metre gauge Gossau–Wasserauen lines.

== Layout ==
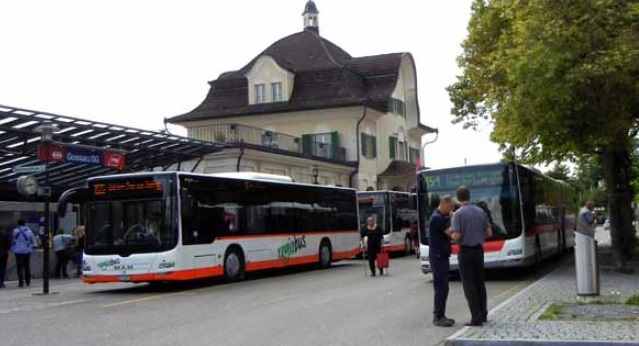
Bus station

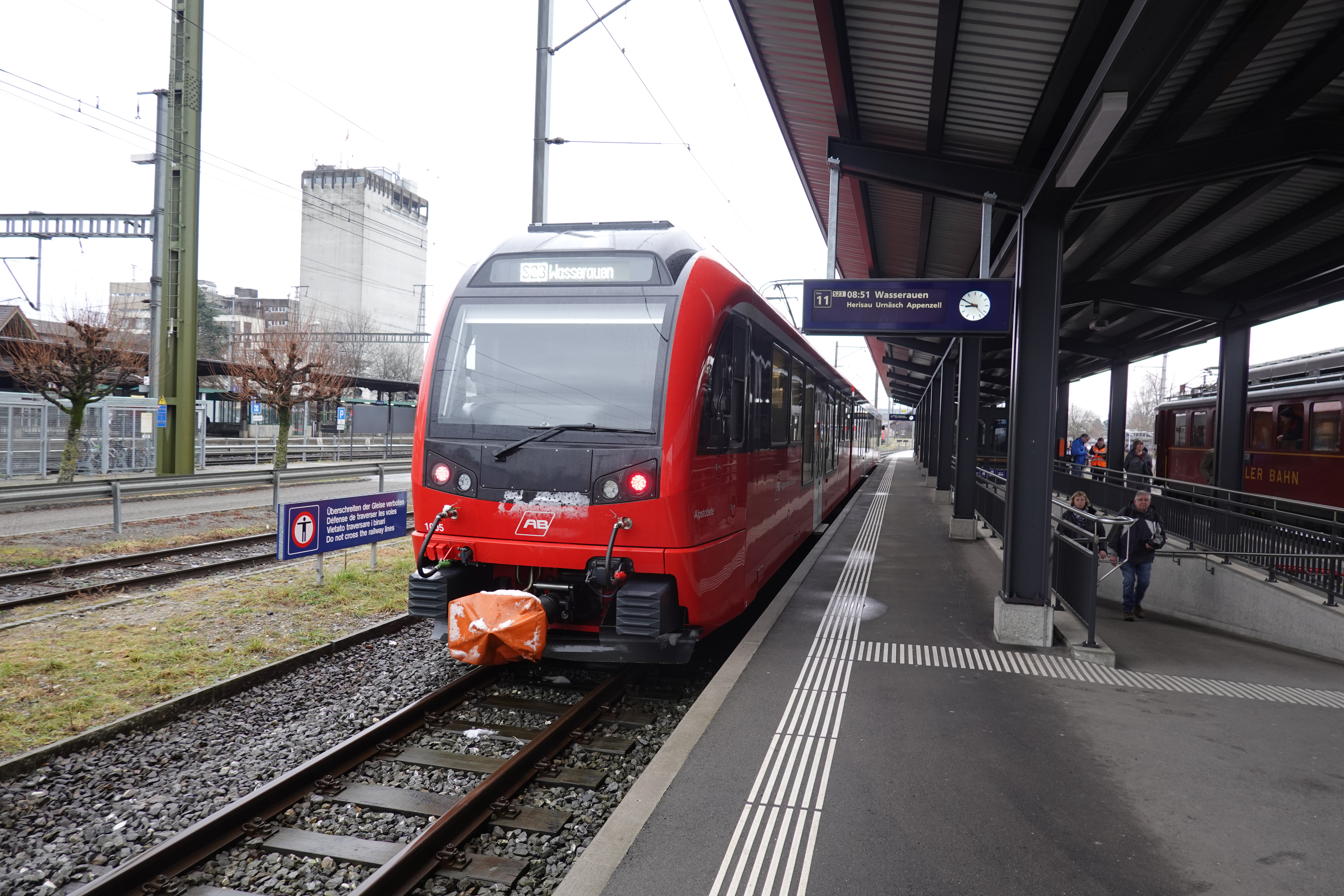
S23 train of AB

The station has one island platform and one side platform on the St. Gallen–Winterthur line, with tracks (Gleis) numbered 1, 3 and 4. These tracks are used by InterCity (IC), InterRegio (IR) and S-Bahn services S1 and S5.

The S23 service departs from the adjacent Appenzell Railways (AB) station, where two platforms and tracks (Gleis 11/12) exist.

PostAuto Schweiz and RegioBus bus lines depart from the bus station in front of the station building (Bahnhofplatz).

== Services ==
As of the December 2023 timetable change, the following services stop at Gossau SG:

- /: half-hourly service between Zürich HB and St. Gallen and hourly service to Geneva Airport and Chur.
- St. Gallen S-Bahn:
  - S1: half-hourly service over the St. Gallen–Winterthur line between Wil SG and Schaffhausen via St. Gallen and Romanshorn, supplementing the long-distance services.
  - S5: half-hourly (weekdays) or hourly (weekends) service between Weinfelden and St. Gallen; hourly service to St. Margrethen.
  - S23: half-hourly service over the Gossau–Wasserauen line to Wasserauen, via Herisau and Appenzell.

During weekends, the station is served by two nighttime S-Bahn services (SN21, SN22), offered by Ostwind fare network, and operated by Thurbo for St. Gallen S-Bahn.

- St. Gallen S-Bahn:
  - SN21: hourly service to Winterthur and to St. Gallen.
  - SN22: hourly service to Winterthur and to Heerbrugg (via St. Gallen).

== See also ==
- Rail transport in Switzerland
