= List of cultural property of national significance in Switzerland: Appenzell Innerrhoden =

This list contains all cultural property of national significance (class A) in the canton of Appenzell Innerrhoden from the 2009 Swiss Inventory of Cultural Property of National and Regional Significance. It is sorted by municipality.

The geographic coordinates provided are in the Swiss coordinate system as given in the Inventory.

== Appenzell ==
KGS No.^{?}	Picture	Name	Street Address	CH1903 X coordinate	CH1903 Y coordinate	Location
333	Farm House Kuenzes	Farm House Kuenzes	Lehnstrasse 102	749.384	245.189	47.340625°N 9.415503°E
9907	Horersjokelis House with Barn	Horersjokelis House with Barn	Lehn 76	748.971	244.987	47.338902°N 9.409973°E
342	Capuchin Monastery Maria der Engel	Capuchin Monastery Maria der Engel		748.630	244.169	47.331624°N 9.405191°E
8813	Cantonal Achieves of Appenzell Innerrhoden	Cantonal Achieves of Appenzell Innerrhoden	Marktgasse 2	748.976	244.127	47.331168°N 9.409753°E
9552	Medieval / Early Modern Village	Medieval / Early Modern Village		748.400	244.000	47.330156°N 9.402093°E
8468	Museum Appenzell	Museum Appenzell	Hauptgasse 4	748.981	244.094	47.33087°N 9.409808°E
331	Parish Church of St. Mauritius	Parish Church of St. Mauritius	Hauptgasse 2	749.010	244.100	47.330918°N 9.410194°E
332	Rathaus (Town council house)	Rathaus (Town council house)	Hauptgasse 6	748.968	244.092	47.330855°N 9.409636°E
354	Appenzell Castle	Appenzell Castle	Poststrasse 5	748.969	243.991	47.329947°N 9.409615°E
Unknown		ISOS Kleinstadt / Flecken: Appenzell				

== Gonten ==
KGS No.^{?}	Picture	Name	Street Address	CH1903 X coordinate	CH1903 Y coordinate	Location
363	Bürgerhaus Roothuus	Bürgerhaus Roothuus	Dorf	744.254	243.752	47.328846°N 9.347179°E

== Schlatt-Haslen ==
KGS No.^{?}	Picture	Name	Street Address	CH1903 X coordinate	CH1903 Y coordinate	Location
383	Farm House Ulrichlis	Farm House Ulrichlis	Lank	747.904	246.034	47.348556°N 9.396204°E
Unknown		ISOS hamlet: Schlatt				

== Schwende-Rüte ==
KGS No.^{?}	Picture	Name	Street Address	CH1903 X coordinate	CH1903 Y coordinate	Location
370	Alte Bleiche	Alte Bleiche	Bleichestrasse 8	749.623	243.824	47.328297°N 9.418209°E
Unknown		Altwasser-Höhle, Late Paleolithic Shelter				
371	Farm House	Farm House	Blumenau	750.492	242.917	47.319944°N 9.429397°E
386	Wildkirchli site with Chapel of St. Michael and Paleolithic Houses / Early Modern Settlement	Wildkirchli site with Chapel of St. Michael and Paleolithic Houses / Early Modern Settlement		749.506	238.960	47.284588°N 9.415041°E
