= Berggasthaus Äscher =

Aescher-Wildkirchli mountain inn
- Berggasthaus Äscher (German)
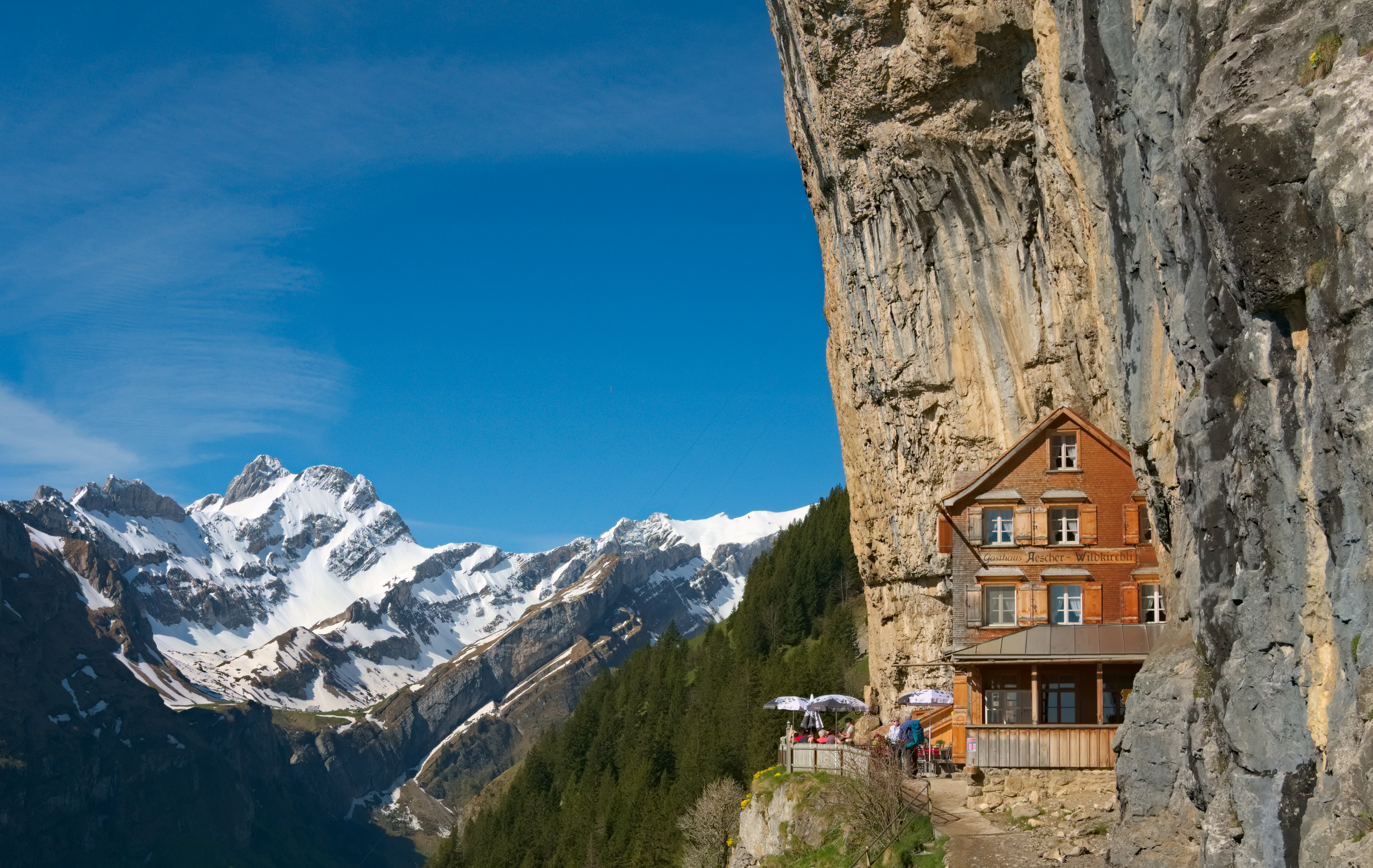
- Aescher inn in 2021 (Altmann in the background)

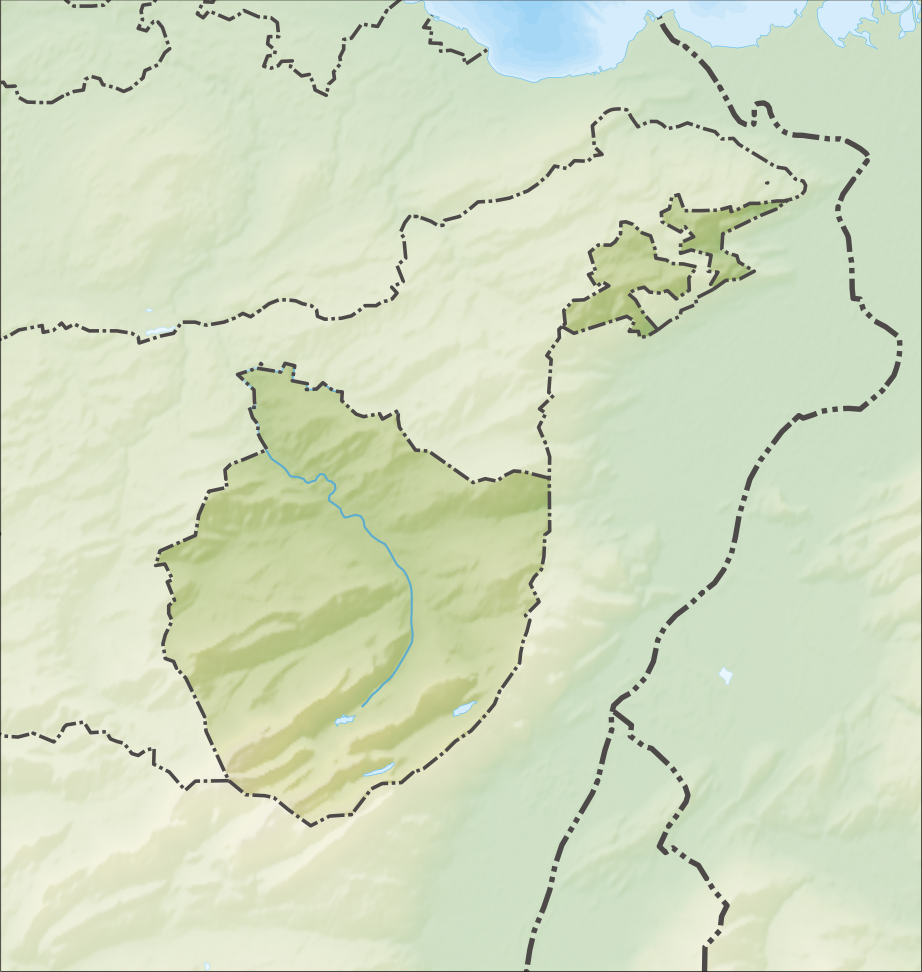
- Location in Switzerland Location in the canton of Appenzell Innerrhoden
- 47°17′0.2″N 9°24′51.7″E
- Location: Appenzell Innerrhoden; Switzerland

History
- Built: 1846 (1860)

Site notes
- Governing body: Wildkirchli Foundation

The Berggasthaus Äscher (also known as Aescher-Wildkirchli mountain inn) is one of several inns in the Alpstein massif in the Swiss canton of Appenzell Innerrhoden (Schwende-Rüte district). It was built in one of the caves of the Wildkirchli, below the Ebenalp (at 1,640 m above the sea), along the path to Äscher.

== History ==
The inn around 1910

The mountain inn has been in existence since 1846. The current building was constructed in 1860 on the site of a rock shelter for monks living as hermits. It is a listed building of national significance and belongs to the Wildkirchli Foundation.

Since the 'Berggasthaus Äscher' appeared on the cover of National Geographic in 2015 (title “Places of a lifetime”), tourism has grown rapidly. Photos shared via social media boosted the famousness of the picturesque location. Since then, it also has become a symbol of overtourism. Car traffic has increased, especially during the peak season.

In 2019/2020, the building fabric was renovated. The external appearance of the Äscher remained almost unchanged.

== Transport ==
Wasserauen railway station, located at 869 m (2,851 ft), is the upper terminus of the Gossau–Wasserauen railway line and situated near the valley station of an aerial tram (Luftseilbahn Wasserauen–Ebenalp) to Ebenalp. The railway staition is served by the S23 service of St. Gallen S-Bahn to Appenzell, Herisau and Gossau SG stations (the latter two are served by national long-distance trains).

== Gallery ==
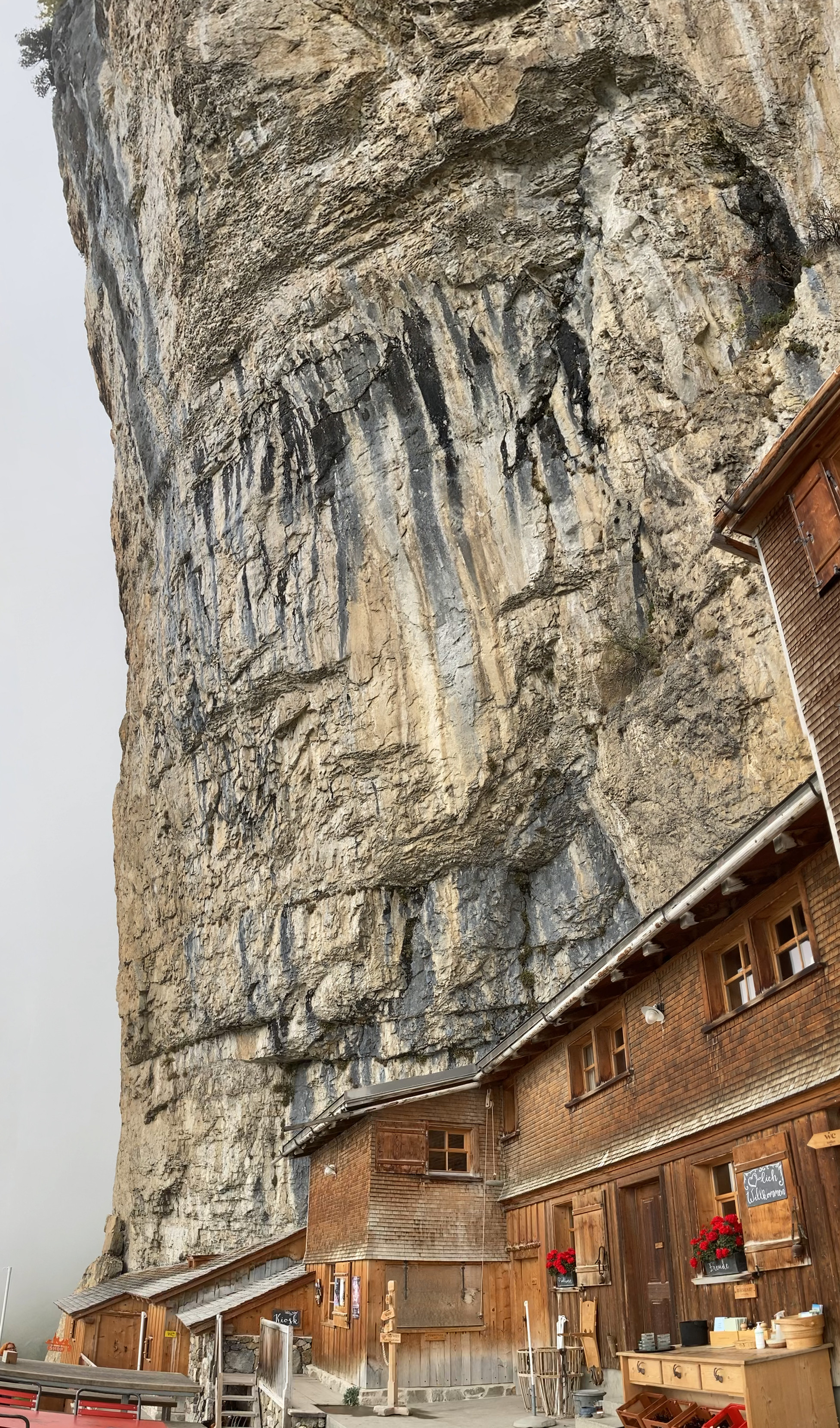

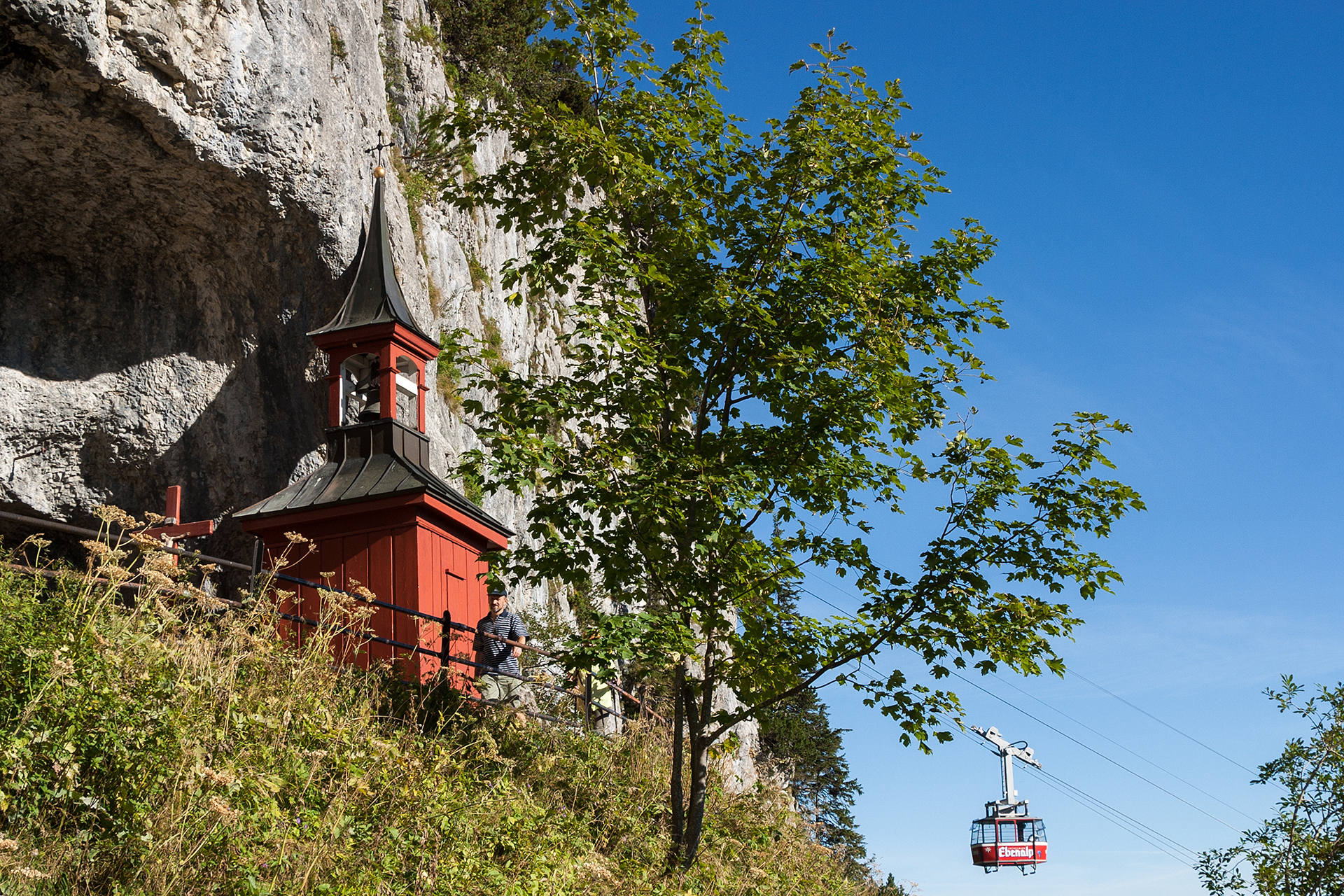

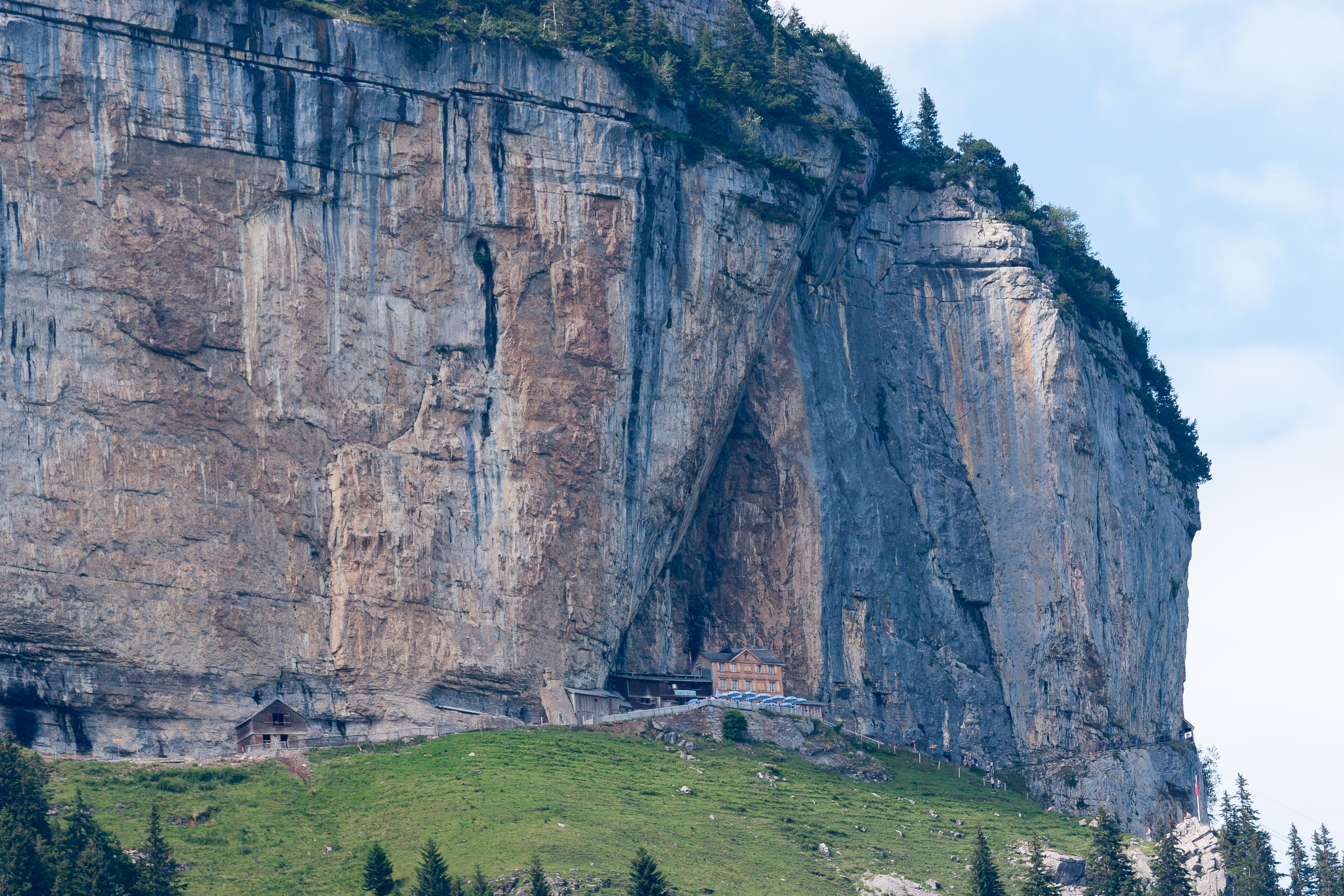

== See also ==
- List of restaurants in Switzerland
- Tourism in Switzerland
