= Wasserauen =

Rural locality in Appenzell Innerrhoden, Switzerland

Coordinates: 47.284986°N 9.428694°E

Wasserauen is a place in the district of Schwende in the canton of Appenzell Innerrhoden in Switzerland.

The settlement consists of a few farms, the terminus stations of the railway line Gossau – Appenzell – Wasserauen of the Appenzeller Bahnen and the cable car Wasserauen - Ebenalp as well as a parking lot for tourists. The railway station also contains a museum run by the Appenzeller Bahnen.

It is also a landing pad for paragliders starting from the Ebenalp and starting point for hikes to the Seealpsee, Ebenalp, Berggasthaus Äscher, Wildkirchli and Säntis.

The Seealpsee-Wasserauen hydropower plant delivers approximately 10% of the Canton of Appenzell Inner Rhoden with environmentally friendly electricity. Thanks to its commissioning, electric light appeared in Appenzell in 1905.

== See also ==
- Alpstein
