= Seealpsee =

Lake in Appenzell Innerrhoden, Switzerland

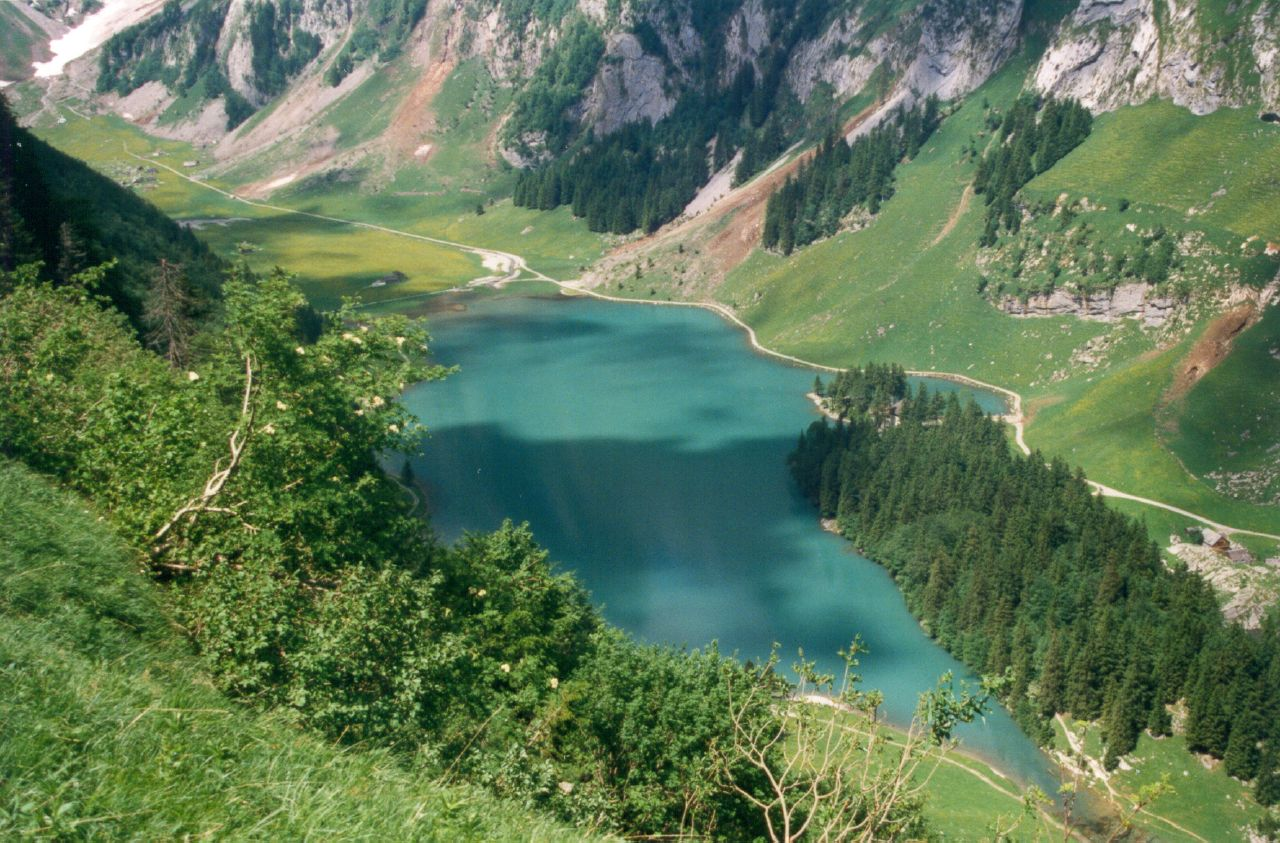

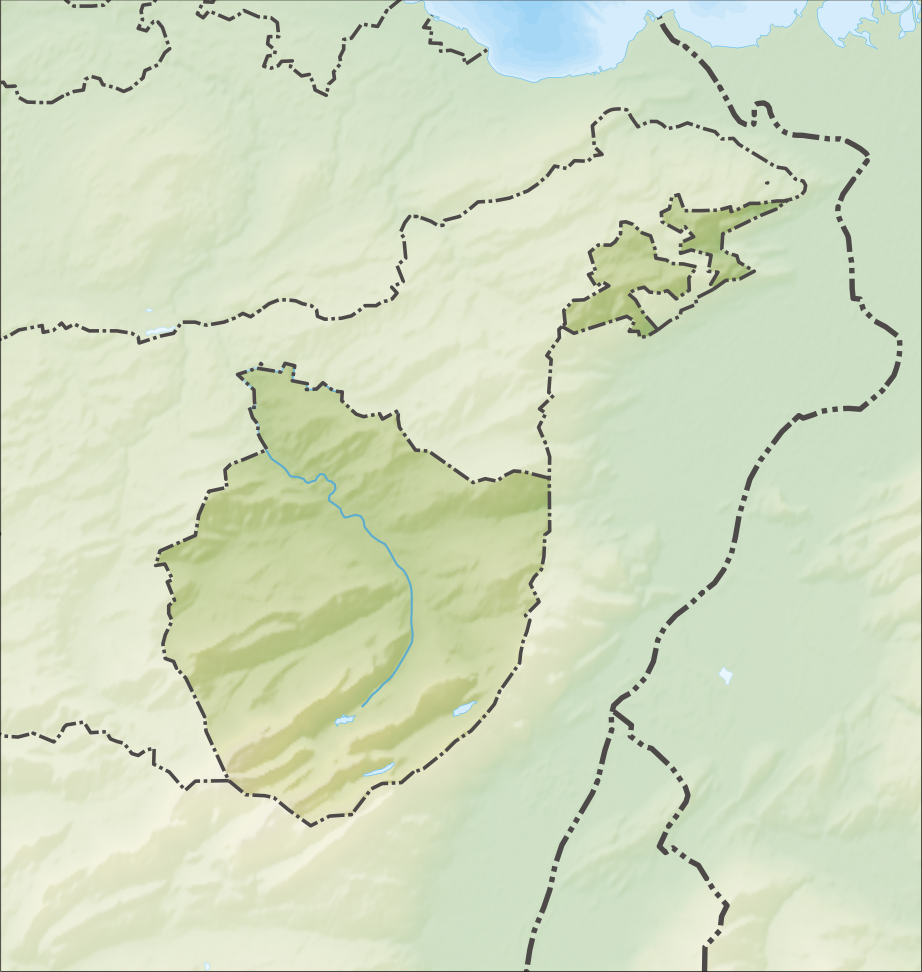
- Location within Canton of Appenzell Innerrhoden Location within Switzerland Location within Alps
- Interactive map of Seealpsee
- Location: Appenzell Innerrhoden
- Coordinates: 47°16′8″N 9°24′0″E
- Primary inflows: Schwendibach
- Primary outflows: Schwendibach
- Basin countries: Switzerland
- Surface area: 13.6 ha (34 acres)
- Max. depth: 15 m (49 ft)
- Surface elevation: 1,143.2 m (3,751 ft)

Seealpsee is a lake in the Alpstein range of the canton of Appenzell Innerrhoden, Switzerland. At an elevation of 1,143.2 m, the surface area is 13.6 hectares (34 acres). The lake can be reached by foot from Wasserauen or from Ebenalp. It is a popular tourist destination. A network of routes around Ebenalp connects Seealpsee with other notable sights in the Appenzell Alps, such as the Wildkirchli and Säntis. The Seealpsee provides hydroelectric power and drinking water to the town of Appenzell through the Kraftwerk Seealpsee-Wasserauen, which is run by the Feuerschaugemeinde.

The Berggasthaus Forelle am Seealpsee, with a large open air terrace, dominates the western end of the lake.

== See also ==
- List of mountain lakes of Switzerland
