= Rüte =

Rüte District Bezirk Rüte
- District
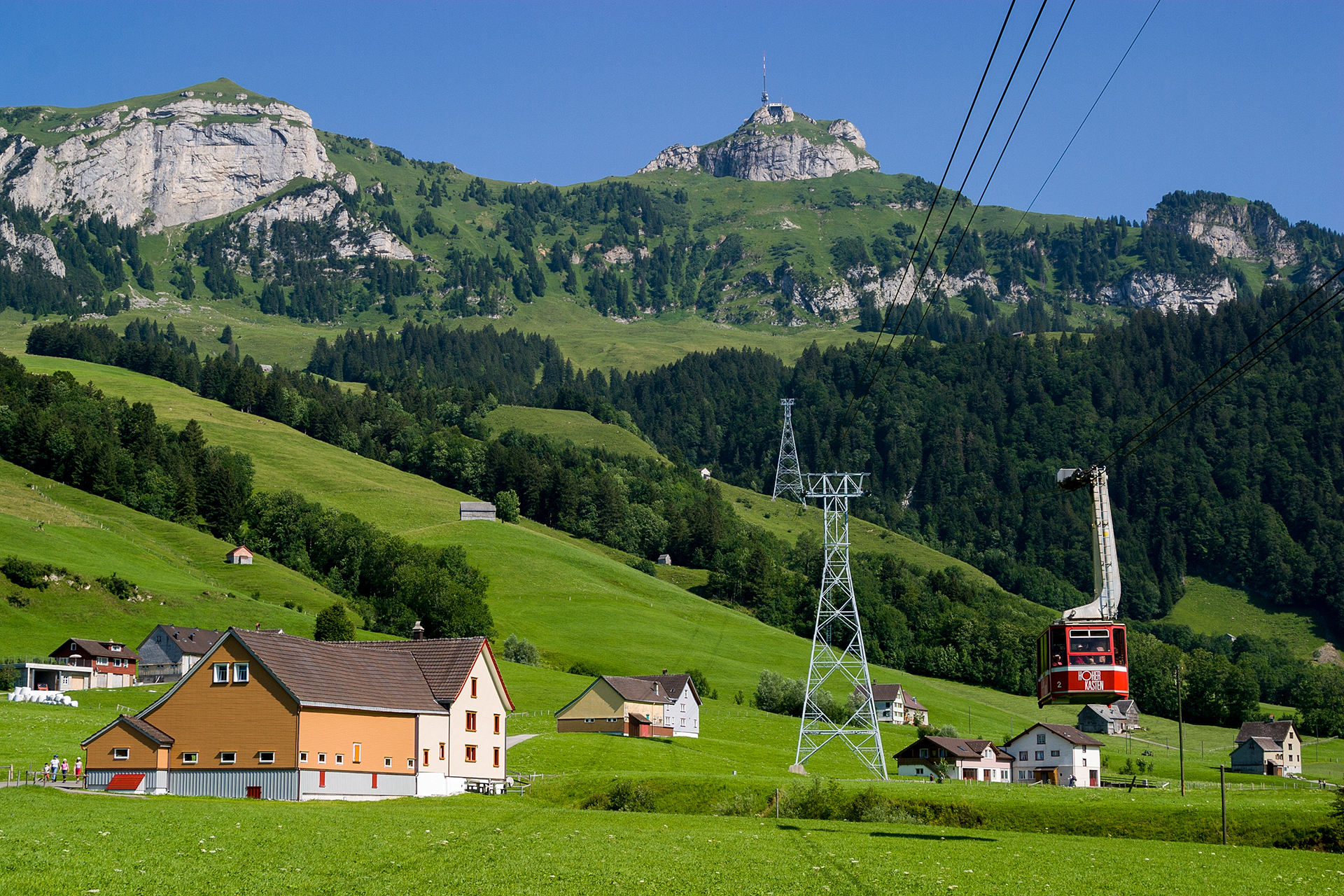

- Flag Coat of arms
- Coordinates: 47°19′N 9°26′E
- Country: Switzerland
- Canton: Appenzell Innerrhoden
- Capital: Appenzell (town)
- District: Schwende-Rüte

Area
  - Total: 40.9 km^{2} (15.8 sq mi)
- Elevation: 799 m (2,621 ft)

Population (December 2020)
  - Total: 3,752
  - Density: 91.7/km^{2} (238/sq mi)
- Time zone: UTC+1 (CET)
  - Summer (DST): UTC+2 (CEST)
- Postal code: 9050
- SFOS number: 3103
- Municipalities: Appenzell Innerrhoden has no municipalities
- Website: http://www.ruete.ch

Rüte District was a district in the canton of Appenzell Innerrhoden in Switzerland.

== History ==
Rüte is first mentioned around 1420-21 as Rütiner rod.

On 1 May 2022, the former districts of Rüte and Schwende merged to form the new district of Schwende-Rüte.

== Name ==
The name Rüte goes back to Reuten, which refers to the German word roden (wood clearing). The name originally comes from one of the two hamlets called Rüti.

== Formation ==
The municipality was formally established in 1872 and did not undergo major changes since then.

== Geography ==
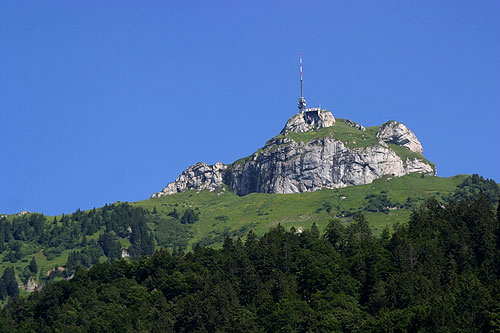
Hoher Kasten mountain (1,795 m (5,889 ft)) near Brülisau

Aerial view from 1600 m by Walter Mittelholzer (1923)

Rüte has an area, as of 2011, of 40.9 square kilometers (15.8 sq mi). Of this area, 55.7% is used for agricultural purposes, while 31.8% is forested. Of the rest of the land, 3.4% is settled (buildings or roads) and 9.1% is unproductive land.

The district stretches from Altmann in the south to the hill country around the Hirschberg in the north. It includes the villages of Brülisau, Eggerstanden and Steinegg as well as portion of Weissbad between the Brüel, Schwendebach and Sitter rivers and the eastern portion of the Appenzell. The administrative center of the district is Steinegg.

== Coat of arms ==
The blazon of the municipal coat of arms is Sable a Semi Swan Argent langued and beaked Gules issuant from a Crown Or adorned of the third.

The coat of arms shows a golden crown on a black background. From the crown a swan's neck with a red beak emerges. This is a modified version of the coat of arms of the Schönenbühl family who were the landlords of the abbey in St. Gallen in the 13th century. The family formerly resided in a castle in Rüte.

== Demographics ==
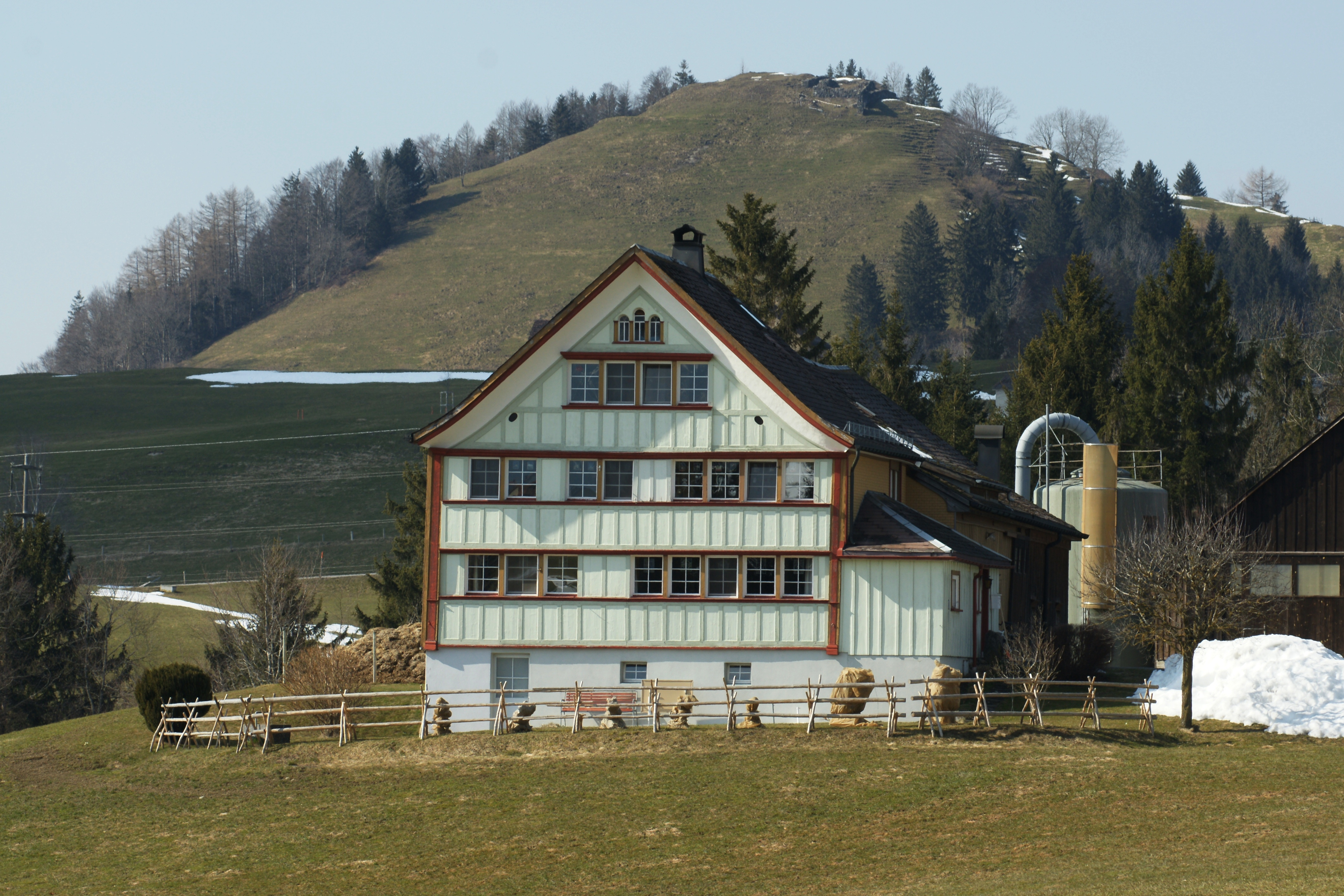
Appenzell farmhouse on the Gaiserstrasse between Gais and Appenzell.

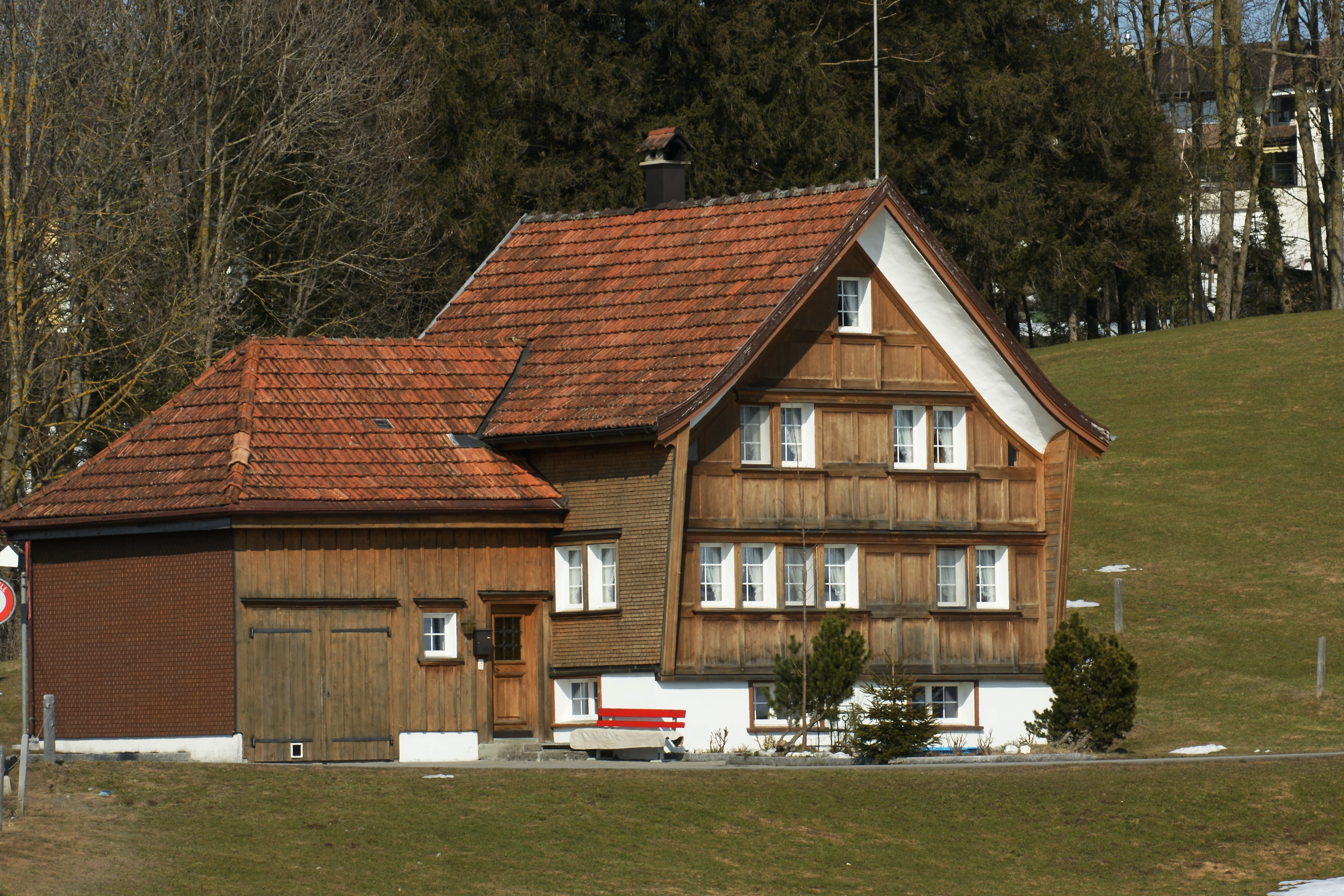
Appenzell farmhouse on the Gaiserstrasse between Gais and Appenzell.

Rüte has a population (as of December 2020) of 3,752. As of 2008, 4.1% of the population are resident foreign nationals. Over the last 10 years (1999–2009 ) the population has changed at a rate of 11.4%. It has changed at a rate of 5.4% due to migration and at a rate of 0.1% due to births and deaths.

Most of the population (as of 2000) speaks German (2,841 or 97.5%), with Serbo-Croatian being second most common (19 or 0.7%) and Italian being third (10 or 0.3%). There are 3 people who speak French and 3 people who speak Romansh.

Of the population in the district 1,667 or about 57.2% were born in Rüte and lived there in 2000. There were 467 or 16.0% who were born in the same canton, while 587 or 20.1% were born somewhere else in Switzerland, and 172 or 5.9% were born outside of Switzerland.

In 2008 there were no live births to or deaths of Swiss citizens. Ignoring immigration and emigration, the population of Swiss citizens remained the same while the foreign population remained the same. There were 2 Swiss men who immigrated back to Switzerland. At the same time, there were 5 non-Swiss men and 8 non-Swiss women who immigrated from another country to Switzerland. The total Swiss population change in 2008 (from all sources, including moves across municipal borders) was an increase of 26 and the non-Swiss population increased by 8 people. This represents a population growth rate of 1.1%.

As of 2000, there were 1,372 people who were single and never married in the district. There were 1,348 married individuals, 137 widows or widowers and 58 individuals who are divorced.

As of 2000 the average number of residents per living room was 0.58 which is about equal to the cantonal average of 0.59 per room. In this case, a room is defined as space of a housing unit of at least 4 m^{2} (43 sq ft) as normal bedrooms, dining rooms, living rooms, kitchens and habitable cellars and attics. About 63.8% of the total households were owner occupied, or in other words did not pay rent (though they may have a mortgage or a rent-to-own agreement).

As of 2000, there were 1,014 private households in the district, and an average of 2.9 persons per household. There were 254 households that consist of only one person and 185 households with five or more people. Out of a total of 1,023 households that answered this question, 24.8% were households made up of just one person and there were 17 adults who lived with their parents. Of the rest of the households, there are 223 married couples without children, 462 married couples with children There were 37 single parents with a child or children. There were 21 households that were made up of unrelated people and 9 households that were made up of some sort of institution or another collective housing.

In 2000 there were 465 single family homes (or 52.3% of the total) out of a total of 889 inhabited buildings. There were 115 multi-family buildings (12.9%), along with 264 multi-purpose buildings that were mostly used for housing (29.7%) and 45 other use buildings (commercial or industrial) that also had some housing (5.1%). Of the single family homes 75 were built before 1919, while 109 were built between 1990 and 2000. The greatest number of single family homes (95) were built between 1981 and 1990.

In 2000 there were 1,124 apartments in the district. The most common apartment size was 5 rooms of which there were 271. There were 19 single room apartments and 614 apartments with five or more rooms. Of these apartments, a total of 978 apartments (87.0% of the total) were permanently occupied, while 104 apartments (9.3%) were seasonally occupied and 42 apartments (3.7%) were empty. As of 2009, the construction rate of new housing units was 4.2 new units per 1000 residents. The vacancy rate for the district, in 2010, was 0.83%.

The historical population is given in the following chart:

== Heritage sites of national significance ==
The Alte Bleiche on Bleichestrasse 8, the Altwasser-Höhle (a late Paleolithic shelter) and the Farm House at Blumenau are listed as Swiss heritage site of national significance.

== Politics ==
In the 2007 federal election the CVP received 84.1% of the vote. In the federal election, a total of 474 votes were cast, and the voter turnout was 21.4%.

== Economy ==
As of 2010, Rüte had an unemployment rate of 0%. As of 2008, there were 276 people employed in the primary economic sector and about 127 businesses involved in this sector. 236 people were employed in the secondary sector and there were 38 businesses in this sector. 313 people were employed in the tertiary sector, with 78 businesses in this sector. There were 1,449 residents of the district who were employed in some capacity, of which females made up 40.0% of the workforce.

In 2008 the total number of full-time equivalent jobs was 630. The number of jobs in the primary sector was 189, all of which were in agriculture. The number of jobs in the secondary sector was 196 of which 98 or (50.0%) were in manufacturing, 1 was in mining and 97 (49.5%) were in construction. The number of jobs in the tertiary sector was 245. In the tertiary sector; 65 or 26.5% were in the sale or repair of motor vehicles, 26 or 10.6% were in the movement and storage of goods, 73 or 29.8% were in a hotel or restaurant, 3 or 1.2% were in the information industry, 2 or 0.8% were the insurance or financial industry, 19 or 7.8% were technical professionals or scientists, 19 or 7.8% were in education and 7 or 2.9% were in health care.

In 2000, there were 206 workers who commuted into the district and 965 workers who commuted away. The district is a net exporter of workers, with about 4.7 workers leaving the district for every one entering. Of the working population, 5.7% used public transportation to get to work, and 54.3% used a private car.

== Transport ==
The district has three railway stations: Hirschberg on the Appenzell–St. Gallen–Trogen line, and Steinegg and Weissbad on the Gossau–Wasserauen line. All three are served by Appenzell Railways.

== Religion ==
From the 2000 census, 2,585 or 88.7% were Roman Catholic, while 197 or 6.8% belonged to the Swiss Reformed Church. Of the rest of the population, there were 7 members of an Orthodox church (or about 0.24% of the population), there was 1 individual who belongs to the Christian Catholic Church, and there were 26 individuals (or about 0.89% of the population) who belonged to another Christian church. There was 1 individual who was Jewish, and 14 (or about 0.48% of the population) who were Islamic. There were 2 individuals who were Hindu and 1 individual who belonged to another church. 44 (or about 1.51% of the population) belonged to no church, are agnostic or atheist, and 37 individuals (or about 1.27% of the population) did not answer the question.

== Education ==
In Rüte about 997 or (34.2%) of the population have completed non-mandatory upper secondary education, and 259 or (8.9%) have completed additional higher education (either University or a Fachhochschule). Of the 259 who completed tertiary schooling, 76.1% were Swiss men, 15.4% were Swiss women, 5.0% were non-Swiss men and 3.5% were non-Swiss women.

As of 2000, there were 37 students in Rüte who came from another district, while 375 residents attended schools outside the district.
