= Schwende District =

Schwende District Bezirk Schwende
- District
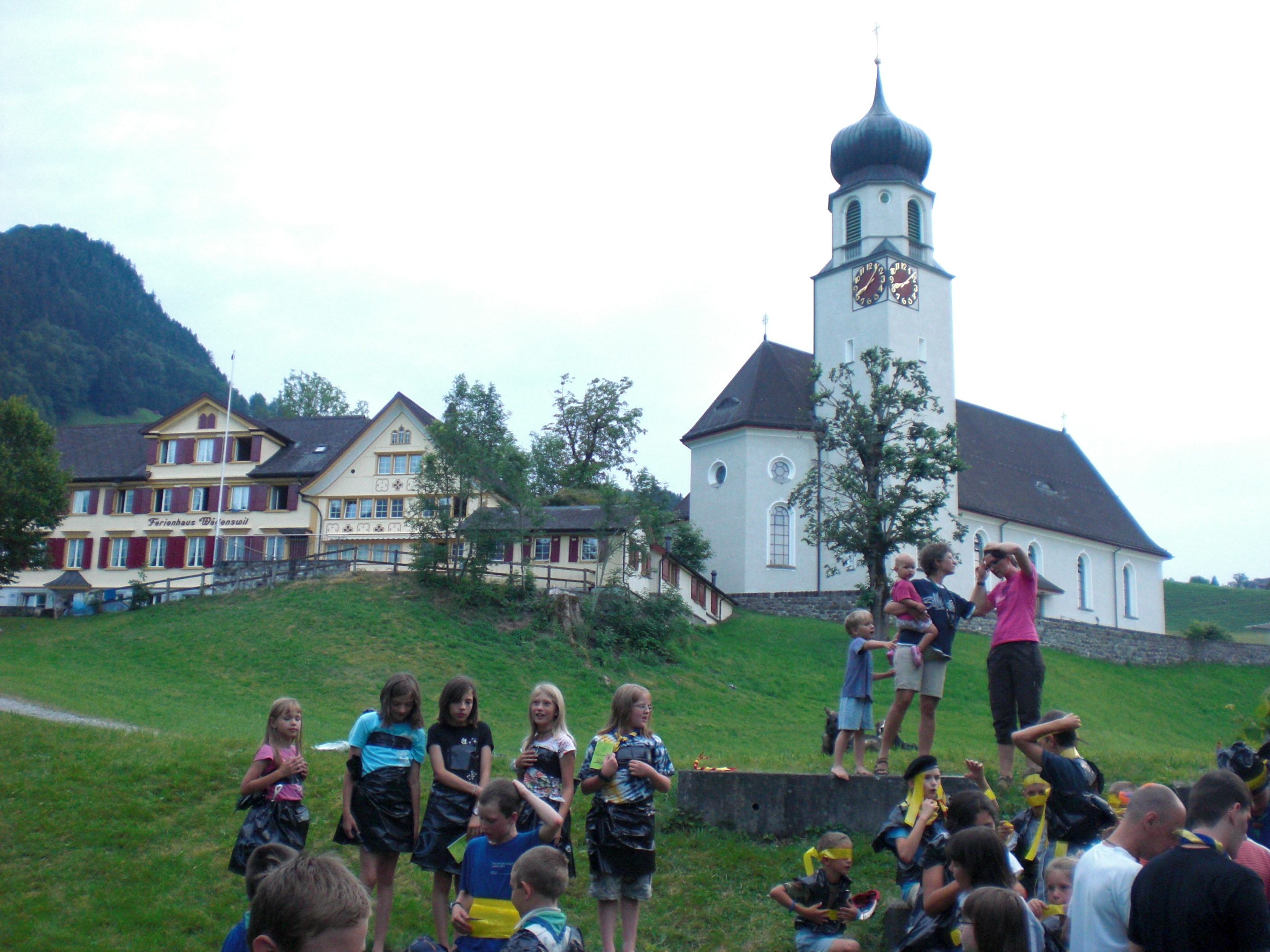

- Flag Coat of arms
- Coordinates: 47°18′N 9°26′E
- Country: Switzerland
- Canton: Appenzell Innerrhoden
- Capital: Appenzell (town)
- District: Schwende-Rüte

Area
  - Total: 57.5 km^{2} (22.2 sq mi)
- Elevation: 838 m (2,749 ft)

Population (December 2020)
  - Total: 2,254
  - Density: 39.2/km^{2} (102/sq mi)
- Time zone: UTC+1 (CET)
  - Summer (DST): UTC+2 (CEST)
- Postal code: 9057
- SFOS number: 3105
- Municipalities: Appenzell Innerrhoden has no municipalities
- Website: http://www.schwende.ch/

Schwende District was a district in the canton of Appenzell Innerrhoden in Switzerland.

== Name ==
In the 12th century the name was recorded as Swendi or swandjan. This is a derivate of the German expression schwinden machen (wood clearing).

== History ==
Schwende first came into existence between 1204 and 1220.

On 1 May 2022, the former districts of Rüte and Schwende merged to form the new district of Schwende-Rüte.

== Geography ==
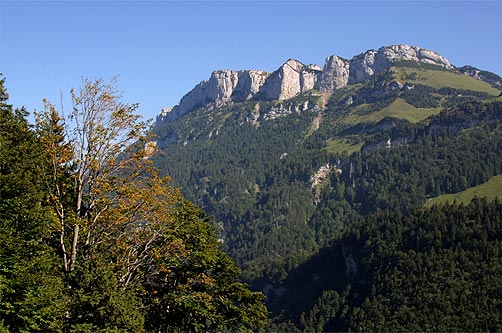
Mountains above Wasserauen

Aerial view from 1500 m by Walter Mittelholzer (1922)

Schwende has an area, as of 2011, of 57.5 square kilometers (22.2 sq mi). Of this area, 48.1% is used for agricultural purposes, while 32.2% is forested. Of the rest of the land, 2.1% is settled (buildings or roads) and 17.6% is unproductive land.

The district covers the portion of the half-canton which lies south-west of the Sitter river. It includes the settlement of Schwende as well as the western portion of Weissbad which is between the Sitter and south of the Brüelbachs. It also includes the village of Wasserauen as well as the majority of the Alpstein mountains to the peak of Mt. Säntis.

== Coat of arms ==
The blazon of the municipal coat of arms is Azure a Castle Argent windowed Sable and roofed Gules issuant from a Mount of 3 Coupeaux Vert with a bandlet wavy Argent.

A silver castle stands on three green mountains. The three mountains are horizontally traversed by a silver waived beam. The background is blue. The coat of arms refers back to the Schwende Castle located in this village, but destroyed at the beginning of Appenzell's liberation wars.

== Demographics ==
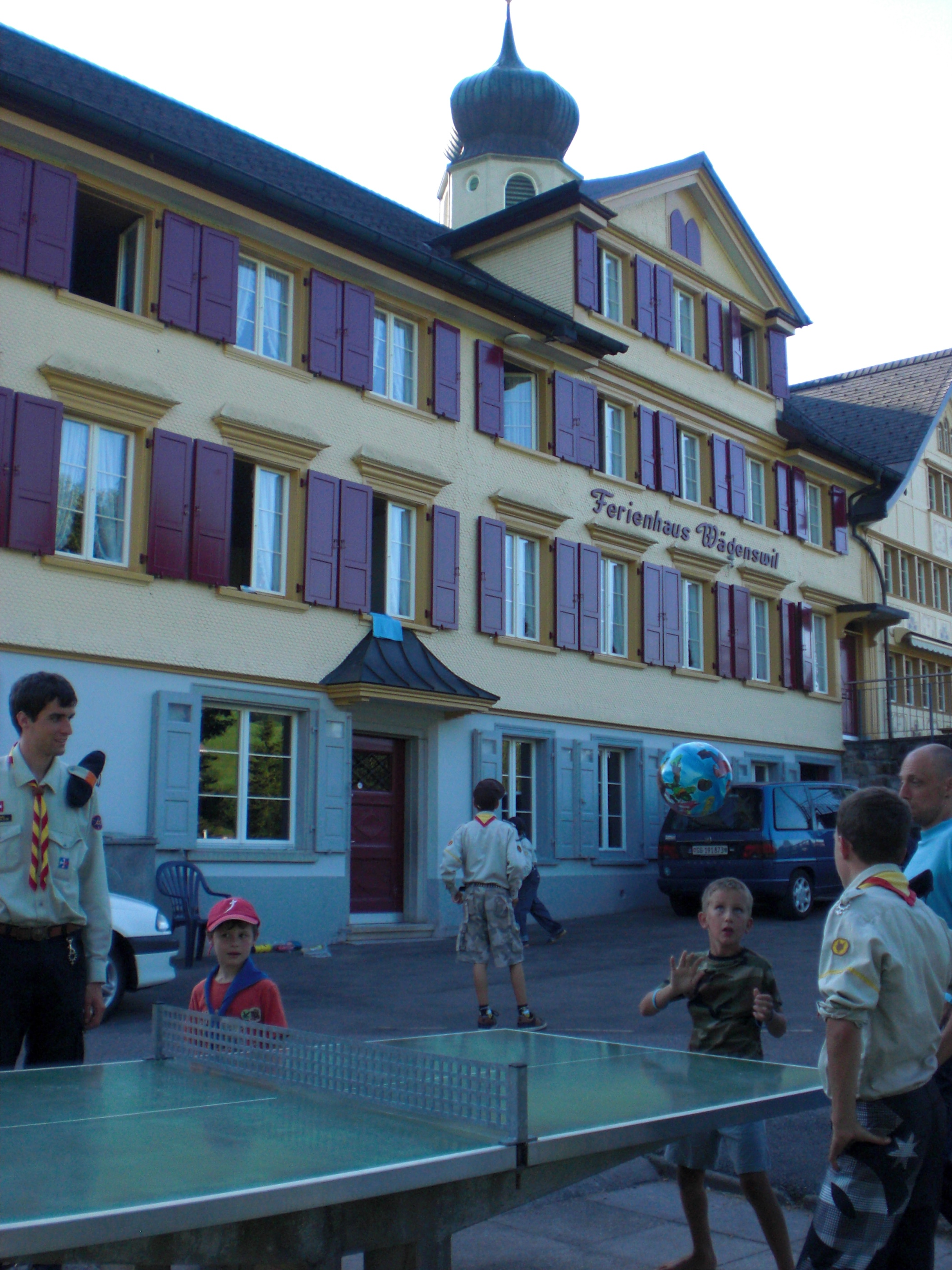
A group plays table tennis in front of buildings in Schwende

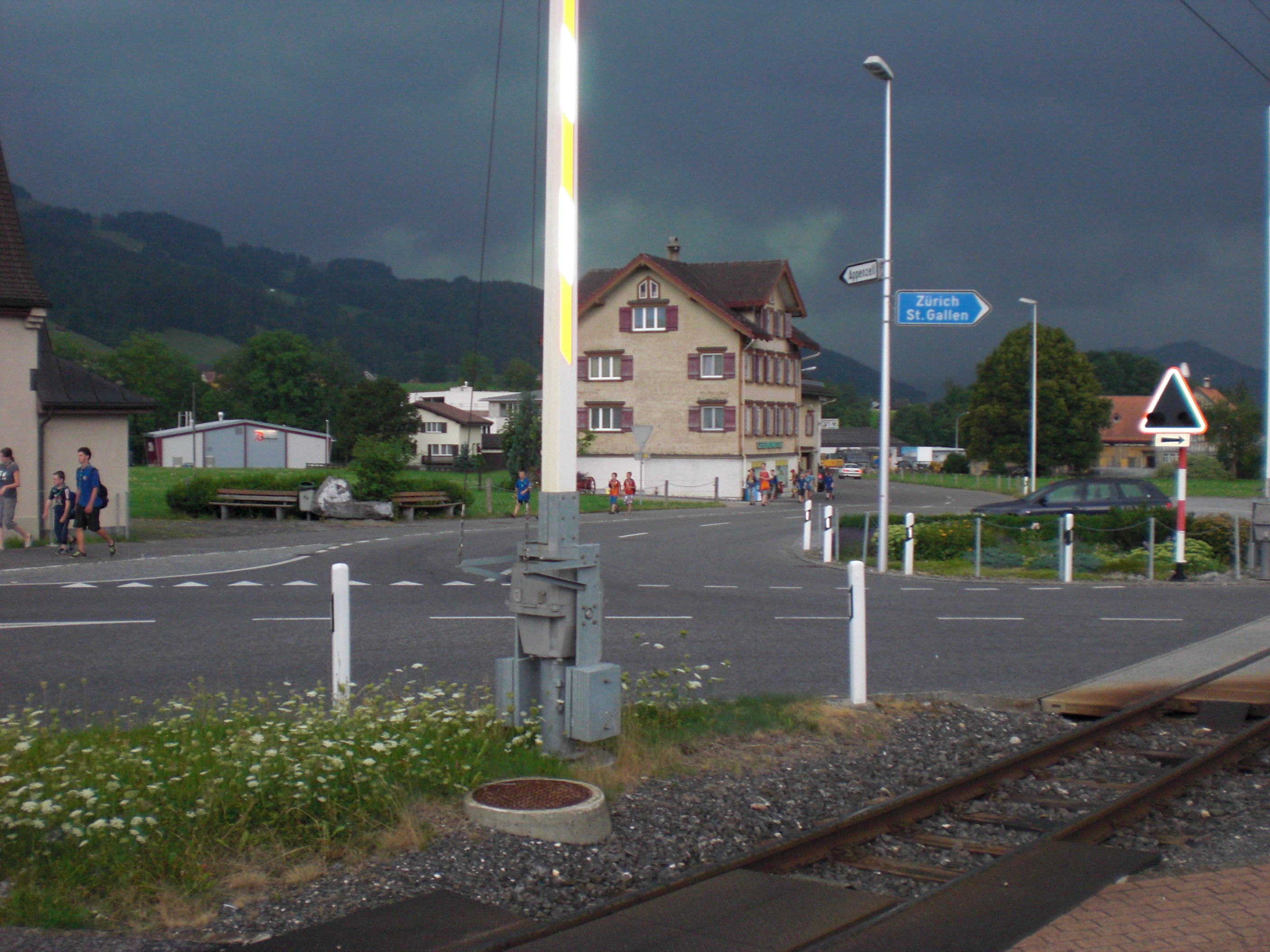
Houses in the Schwende district

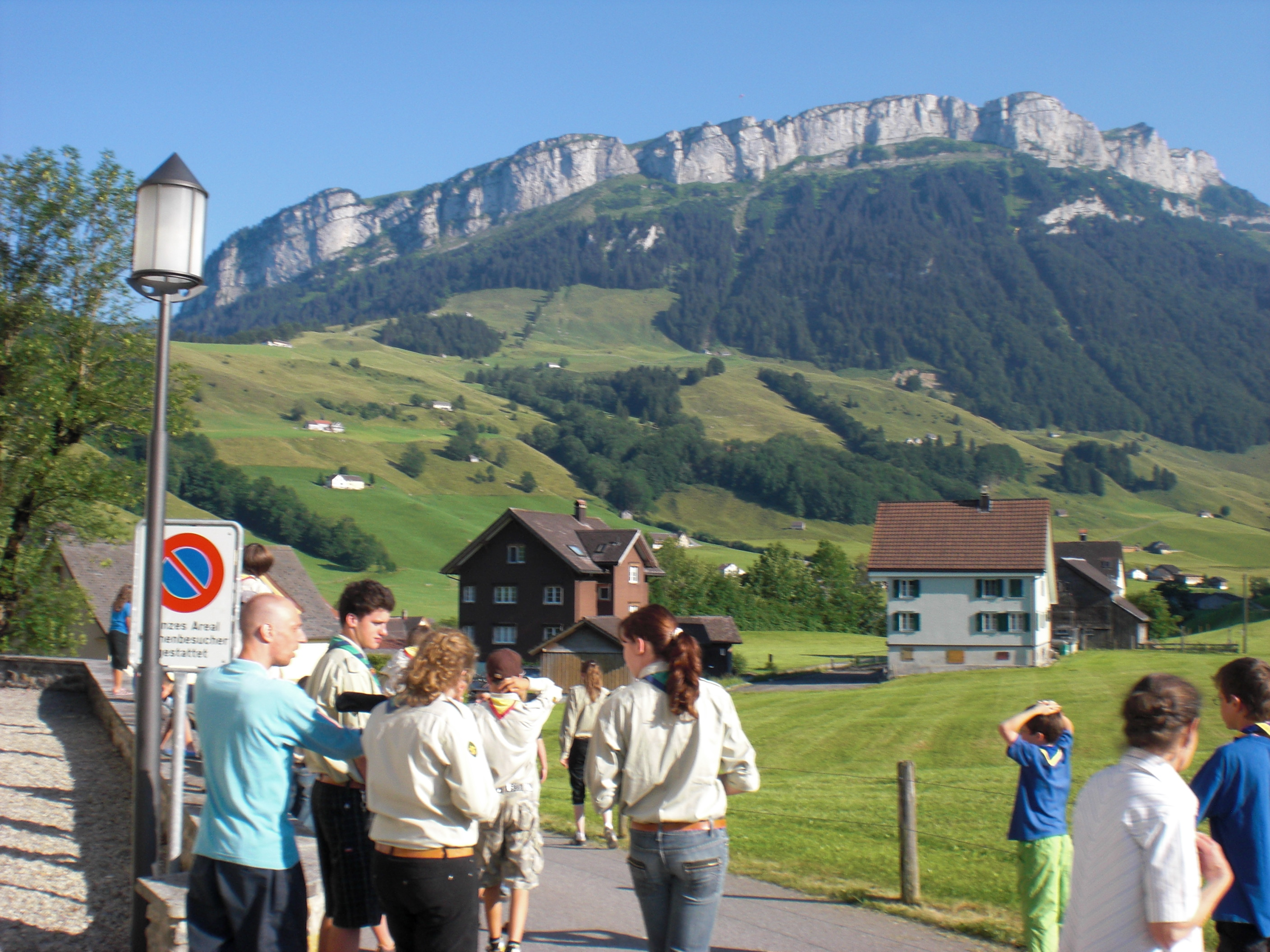
Mountains and houses near Schwende

Schwende has a population (as of December 2020) of 2,254. As of 2008, 6.9% of the population are resident foreign nationals. Over the last 10 years (1999–2009 ) the population has changed at a rate of 7.3%. It has changed at a rate of 5.4% due to migration and at a rate of -0.1% due to births and deaths.

Most of the population (as of 2000) speaks German (1,816 or 93.9%), with Serbo-Croatian being second most common (32 or 1.7%) and Italian being third (15 or 0.8%). There are 5 people who speak French and 3 people who speak Romansh.

Of the population in the district 1,042 or about 53.9% were born in Schwende and lived there in 2000. There were 288 or 14.9% who were born in the same canton, while 418 or 21.6% were born somewhere else in Switzerland, and 181 or 9.4% were born outside of Switzerland.

In 2008, ignoring immigration and emigration, the population of Swiss citizens remained the same while the foreign population remained the same. There was 1 Swiss man and 2 Swiss women who immigrated back to Switzerland. At the same time, there were 3 non-Swiss men and 2 non-Swiss women who immigrated from another country to Switzerland. The total Swiss population change in 2008 (from all sources, including moves across municipal borders) was a decrease of 9 and the non-Swiss population increased by 5 people. This represents a population growth rate of -0.2%.

As of 2000, there were 907 people who were single and never married in the district. There were 899 married individuals, 88 widows or widowers and 41 individuals who are divorced.

As of 2000 the average number of residents per living room was 0.57 which is about equal to the cantonal average of 0.59 per room. In this case, a room is defined as space of a housing unit of at least 4 m^{2} (43 sq ft) as normal bedrooms, dining rooms, living rooms, kitchens and habitable cellars and attics. About 64.5% of the total households were owner occupied, or in other words did not pay rent (though they may have a mortgage or a rent-to-own agreement).

As of 2000, there were 686 private households in the district, and an average of 2.8 persons per household. There were 175 households that consist of only one person and 110 households with five or more people. Out of a total of 700 households that answered this question, 25.0% were households made up of just one person and there were 12 adults who lived with their parents. Of the rest of the households, there are 156 married couples without children, 300 married couples with children There were 31 single parents with a child or children. There were 12 households that were made up of unrelated people and 14 households that were made up of some sort of institution or another collective housing.

In 2000 there were 339 single family homes (or 55.3% of the total) out of a total of 613 inhabited buildings. There were 102 multi-family buildings (16.6%), along with 132 multi-purpose buildings that were mostly used for housing (21.5%) and 40 other use buildings (commercial or industrial) that also had some housing (6.5%). Of the single family homes 55 were built before 1919, while 77 were built between 1990 and 2000. The greatest number of single family homes (71) were built between 1971 and 1980.

In 2000 there were 821 apartments in the district. The most common apartment size was 5 rooms of which there were 239. There were 24 single room apartments and 462 apartments with five or more rooms. Of these apartments, a total of 665 apartments (81.0% of the total) were permanently occupied, while 106 apartments (12.9%) were seasonally occupied and 50 apartments (6.1%) were empty. As of 2009, the construction rate of new housing units was 4.3 new units per 1000 residents. The vacancy rate for the district, in 2010, was 2.27%.

The historical population is given in the following chart:

== Heritage sites of national significance ==
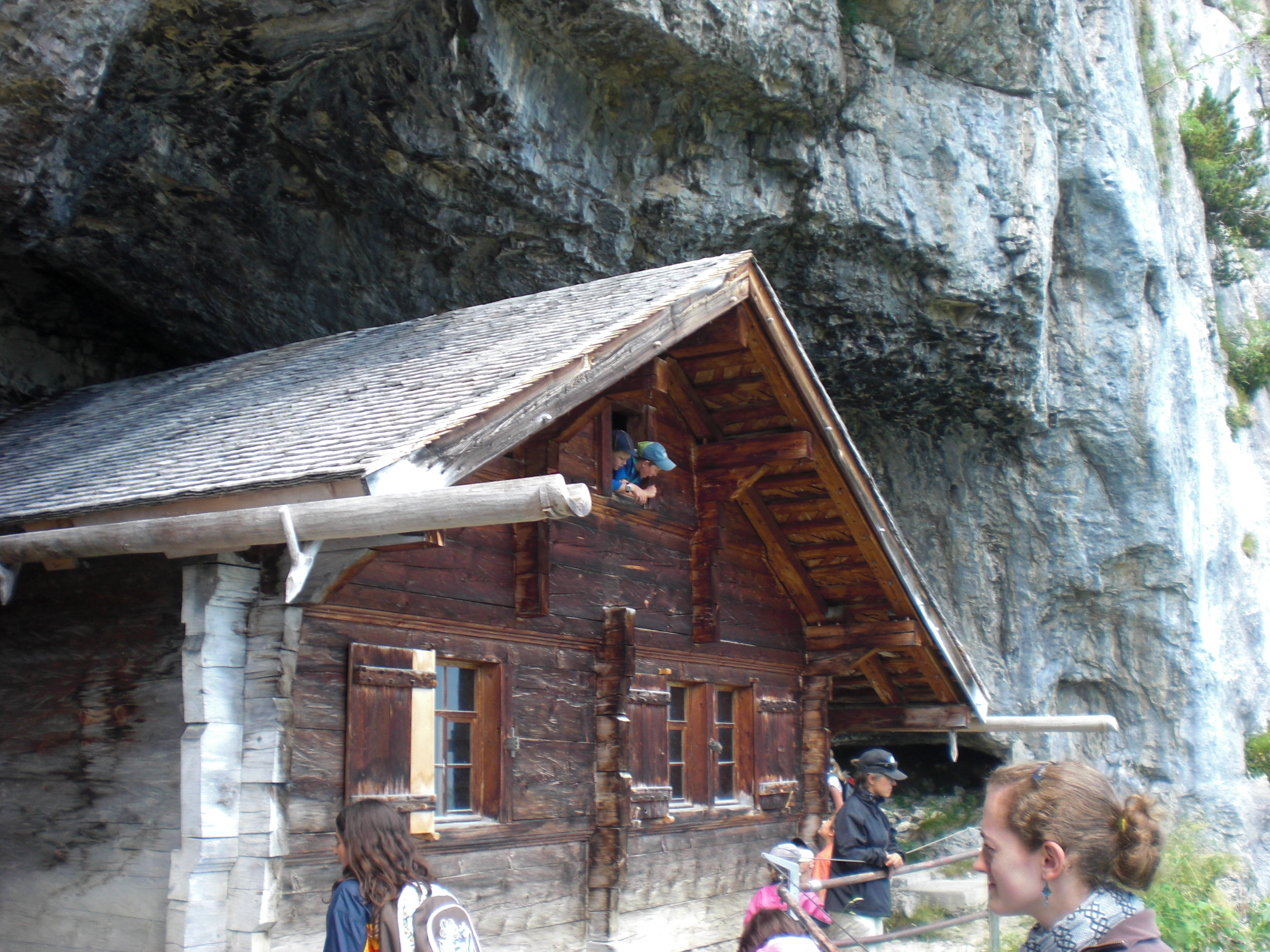
House in Wildkirchli

The Wildkirchli site with the Chapel of St. Michael and paleolithic houses as well as an early modern settlement is listed as a Swiss heritage site of national significance.

== Politics ==
In the 2007 federal election the CVP received 80.99% of the vote. In the federal election, a total of 282 votes were cast, and the voter turnout was 20.0%.

== Economy ==
As of 2010, Schwende had an unemployment rate of 0.2%. As of 2008, there were 147 people employed in the primary economic sector and about 65 businesses involved in this sector. 114 people were employed in the secondary sector and there were 17 businesses in this sector. 590 people were employed in the tertiary sector, with 89 businesses in this sector. There were 975 residents of the district who were employed in some capacity, of which females made up 40.3% of the workforce.

In 2008 the total number of full-time equivalent jobs was 665. The number of jobs in the primary sector was 90, of which 87 were in agriculture and 3 were in forestry or lumber production. The number of jobs in the secondary sector was 103 of which 52 or (50.5%) were in manufacturing and 51 (49.5%) were in construction. The number of jobs in the tertiary sector was 472. In the tertiary sector; 56 or 11.9% were in the sale or repair of motor vehicles, 18 or 3.8% were in the movement and storage of goods, 264 or 55.9% were in a hotel or restaurant, 19 or 4.0% were the insurance or financial industry, 53 or 11.2% were technical professionals or scientists, 41 or 8.7% were in education and 1 was in health care.

In 2000, there were 234 workers who commuted into the district and 661 workers who commuted away. The district is a net exporter of workers, with about 2.8 workers leaving the district for every one entering. About 3.8% of the workforce coming into Schwende are coming from outside Switzerland. Of the working population, 6.8% used public transportation to get to work, and 51.3% used a private car.

== Transport ==
The district has two railway stations: Schwende and Wasserauen. Both are located on the Gossau–Wasserauen line of Appenzell Railways.

== Religion ==
From the 2000 census, 1,641 or 84.8% were Roman Catholic, while 158 or 8.2% belonged to the Swiss Reformed Church. Of the rest of the population, there were 17 members of an Orthodox church (or about 0.88% of the population), and there were 3 individuals (or about 0.16% of the population) who belonged to another Christian church. There were 37 (or about 1.91% of the population) who were Islamic. There was 1 person who was Buddhist and 1 individual who belonged to another church. 67 (or about 3.46% of the population) belonged to no church, are agnostic or atheist, and 10 individuals (or about 0.52% of the population) did not answer the question.

== Education ==
In Schwende about 679 or (35.1%) of the population have completed non-mandatory upper secondary education, and 161 or (8.3%) have completed additional higher education (either University or a Fachhochschule). Of the 161 who completed tertiary schooling, 70.8% were Swiss men, 13.7% were Swiss women, 10.6% were non-Swiss men and 5.0% were non-Swiss women.

As of 2000, there were 28 students in Schwende who came from another district, while 230 residents attended schools outside the district.
