= Ebenalp =

Northernmost mountain of the Appenzell Alps, Switzerland

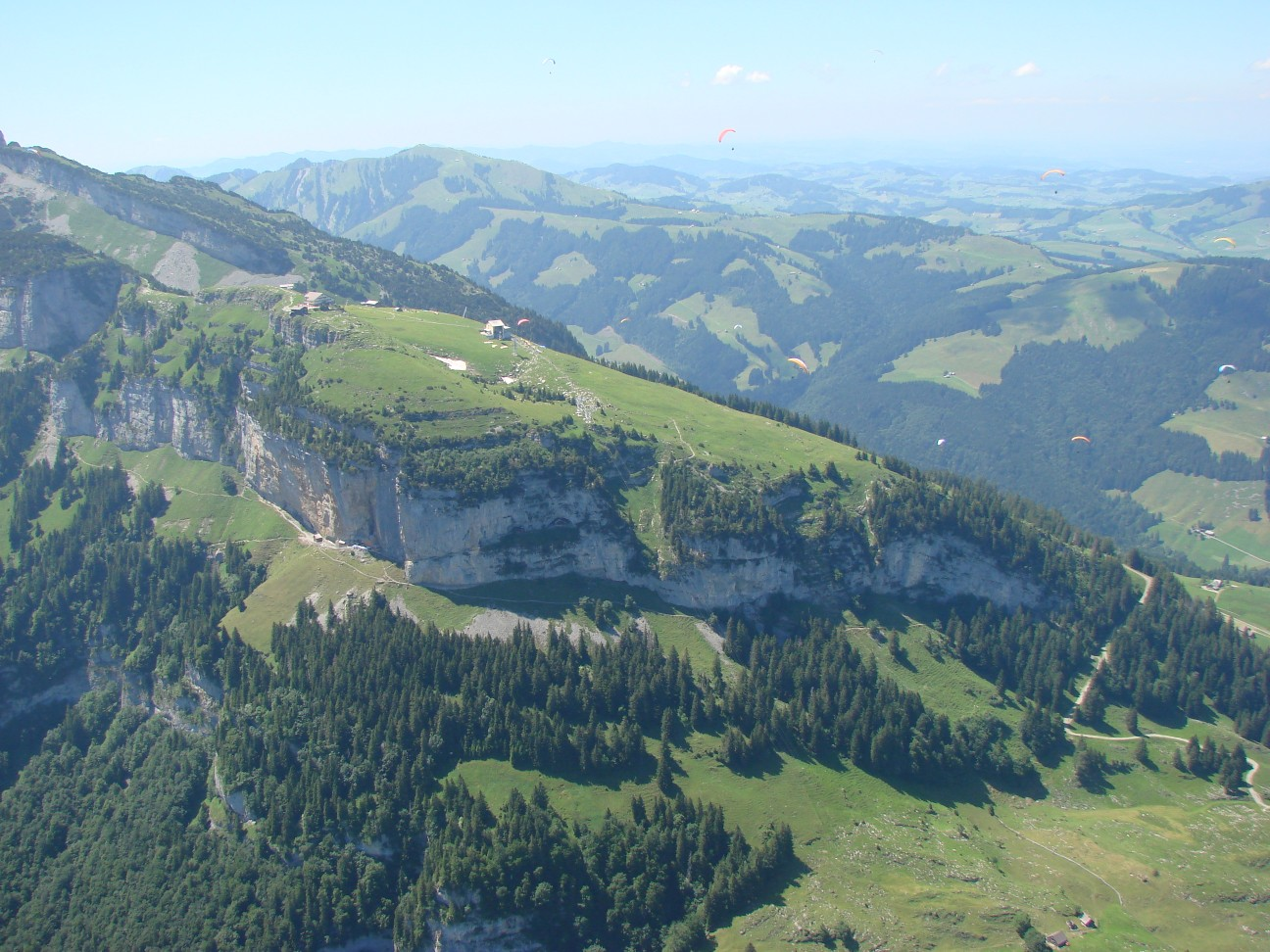

Highest point
- Elevation: 1,640 m (5,380 ft)
- Prominence: 41 m (135 ft)
- Coordinates: 47°17′03″N 9°24′39″E

Geography
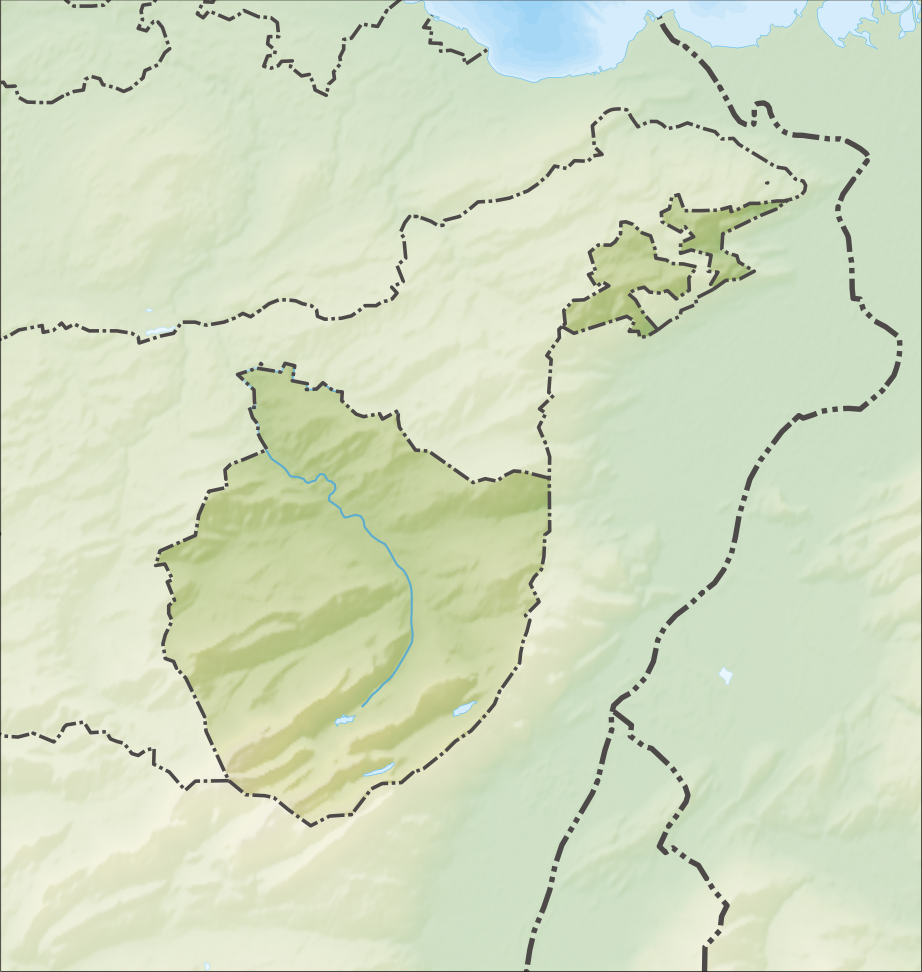
- Location within Alps Location within Switzerland Location within Canton of Appenzell Innerrhoden
- Location: Canton of Appenzell Innerrhoden; Switzerland
- Parent range: Appenzell Alps

The Ebenalp is the northernmost summit of the Alpstein in the Appenzell Alps, Switzerland. The mountain is a popular paragliding and hiking destination.

It has been accessible by cable car from Wasserauen since 1955. Ebenalp attracts up to 200,000 visitors each year.

From the high plateau of the cable car station, visitors have a panoramic view of the rolling hills of Appenzell. Trails start at the station and lead to a network of mountain huts. These hiking routes lead to sites such as Säntis and Seealpsee. The nearby Äscher hut and the Wildkirchli can be reached by hiking through a cave.

== Transport ==
The nearest railway station is Wasserauen, the southern terminus of the Gossau–Wasserauen railway, which is operated by Appenzell Railways (Appenzeller Bahnen, AB). The station is served by the S23 service of St. Gallen S-Bahn to Gossau SG via Appenzell and Herisau, which are both served by long-distance trains. Wasserauen railway station is located across the street of the valley station of an aerial tramway (Luftseilbahn Wasserauen–Ebenalp) to Ebenalp.

== Gallery ==
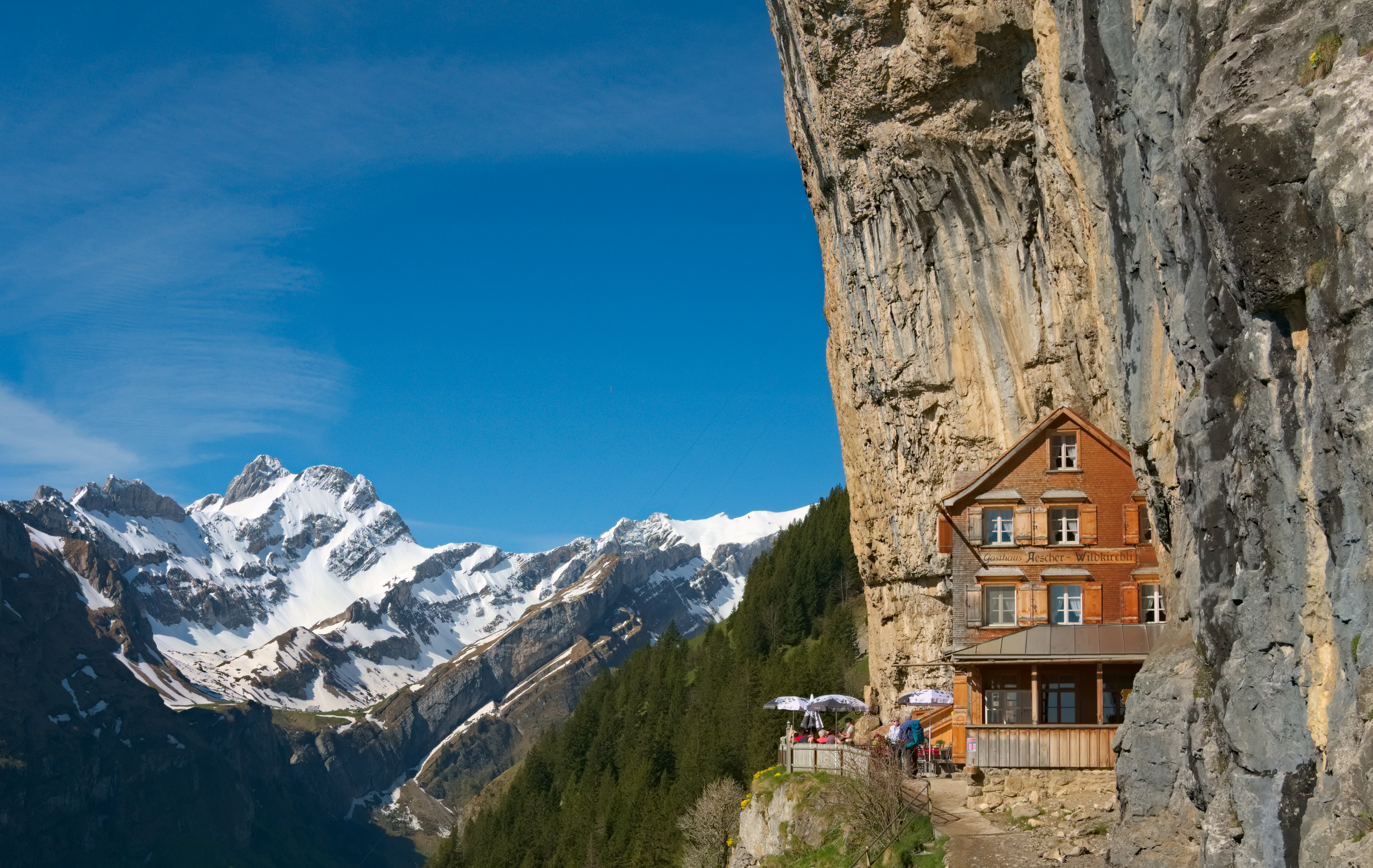
Mountain hut Aescher-Wildkirchli below Ebenalp

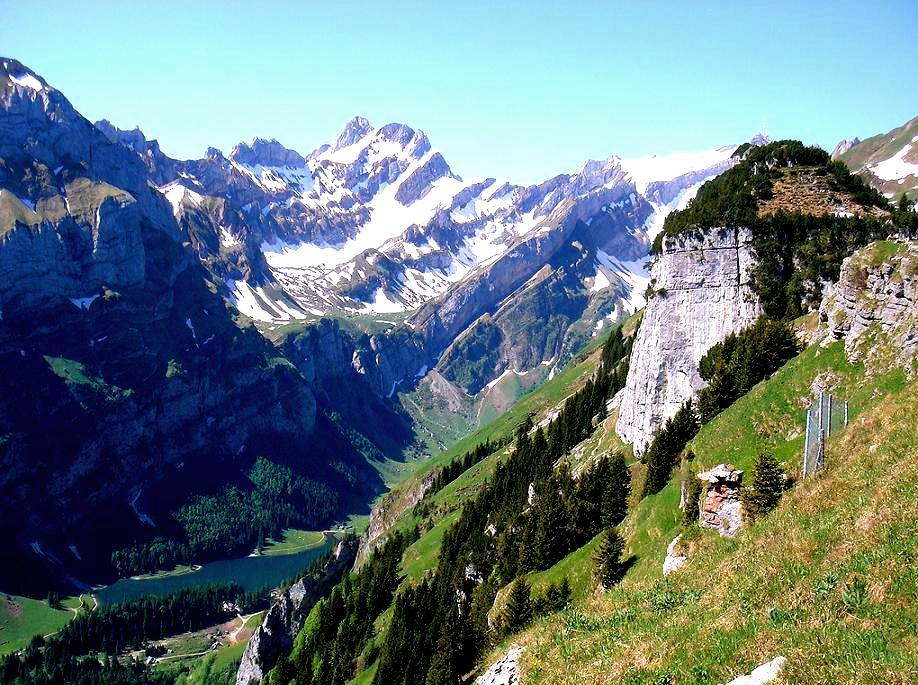
View of Altmann (center), Säntis (right), and Seealpsee from Ebenalp

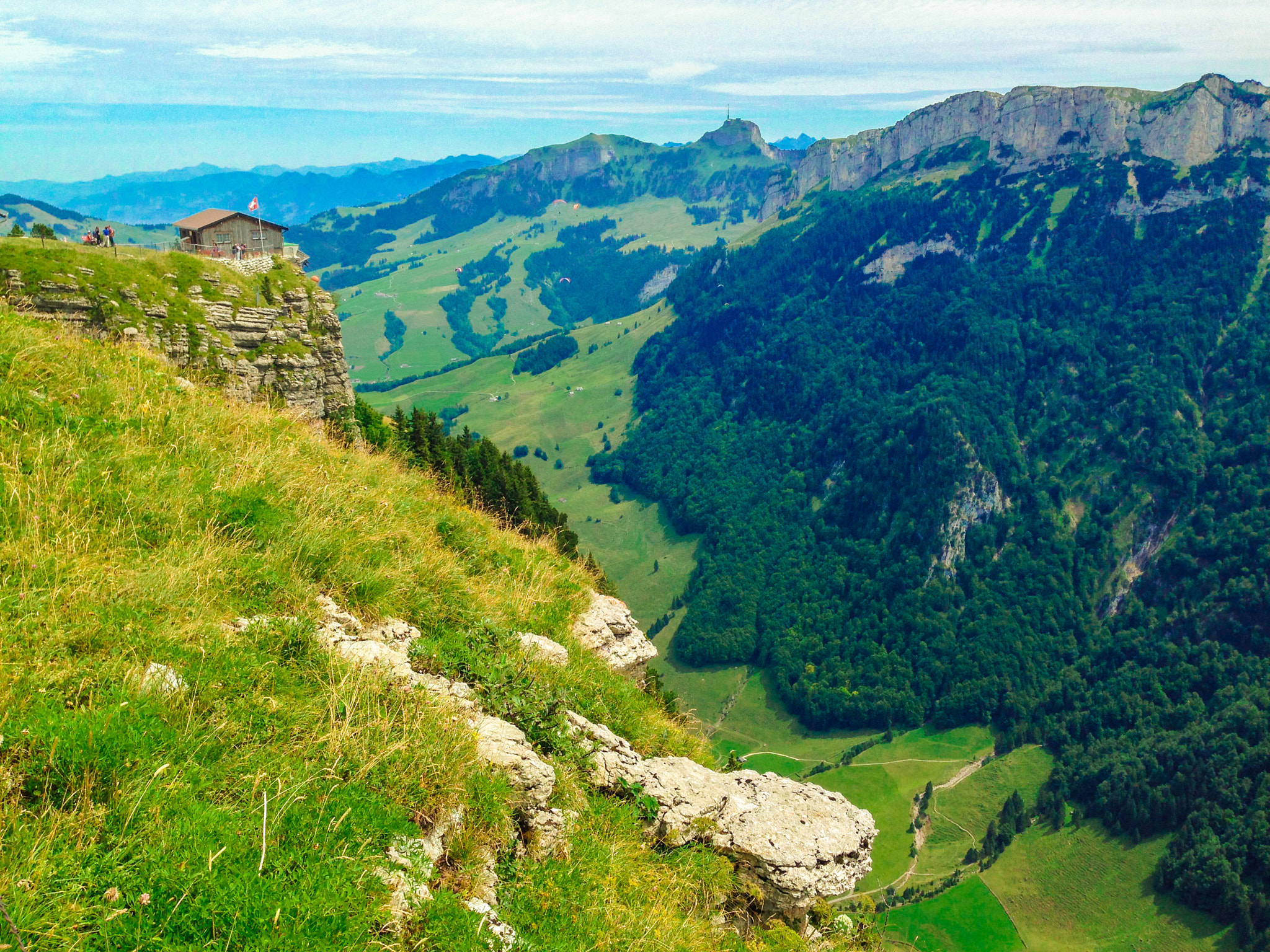
Kamor and Hoher Kasten seen from Ebenalp

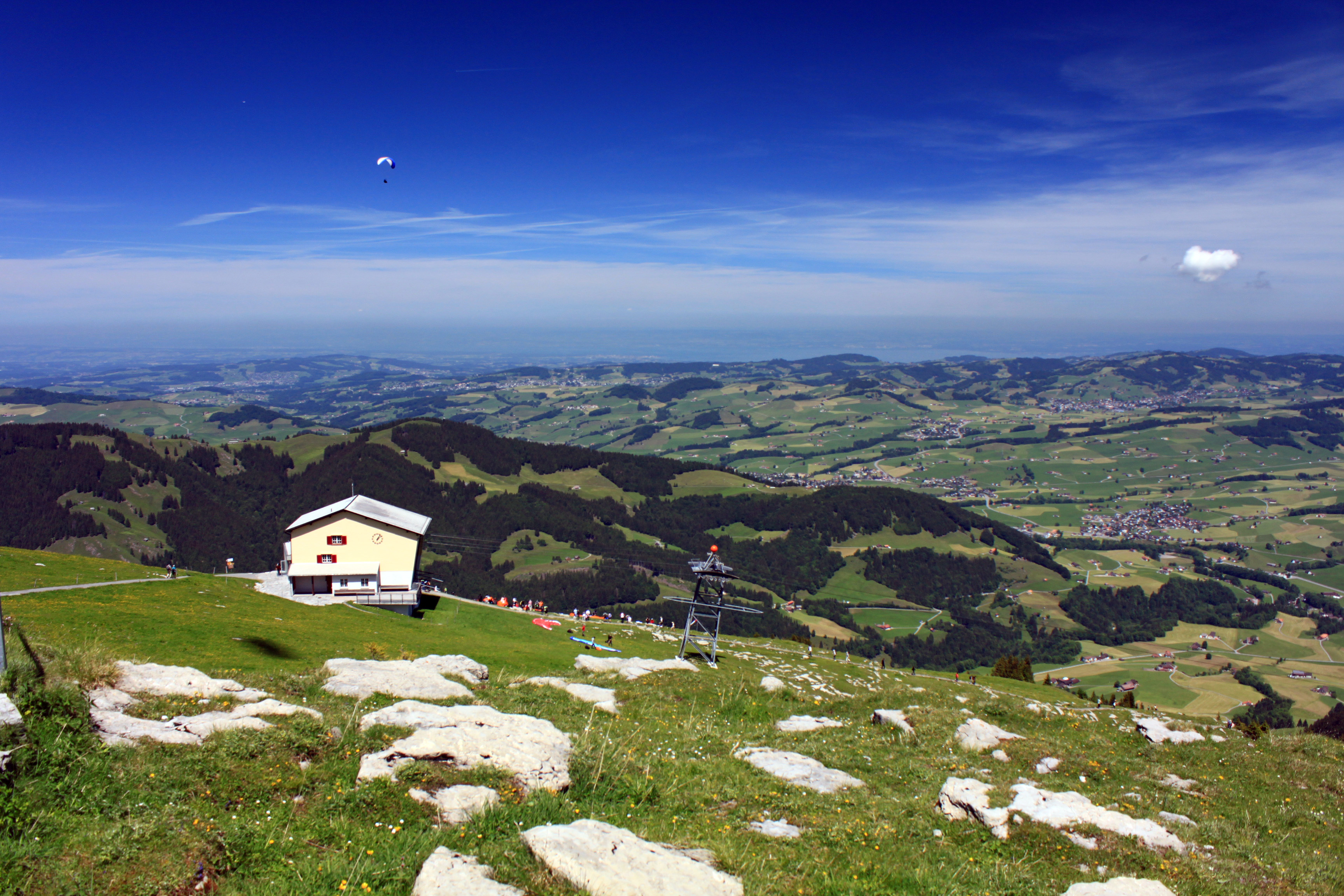
View towards Lake Constance from Ebenalp

== See also ==
- Churfirsten
- Schwägalp Pass
- List of mountains of Appenzell Innerrhoden
- Tourism in Switzerland
