= Appenzell Castle =

Castle in Appenzell, Switzerland

- Schloss von Appenzell
- Appenzell
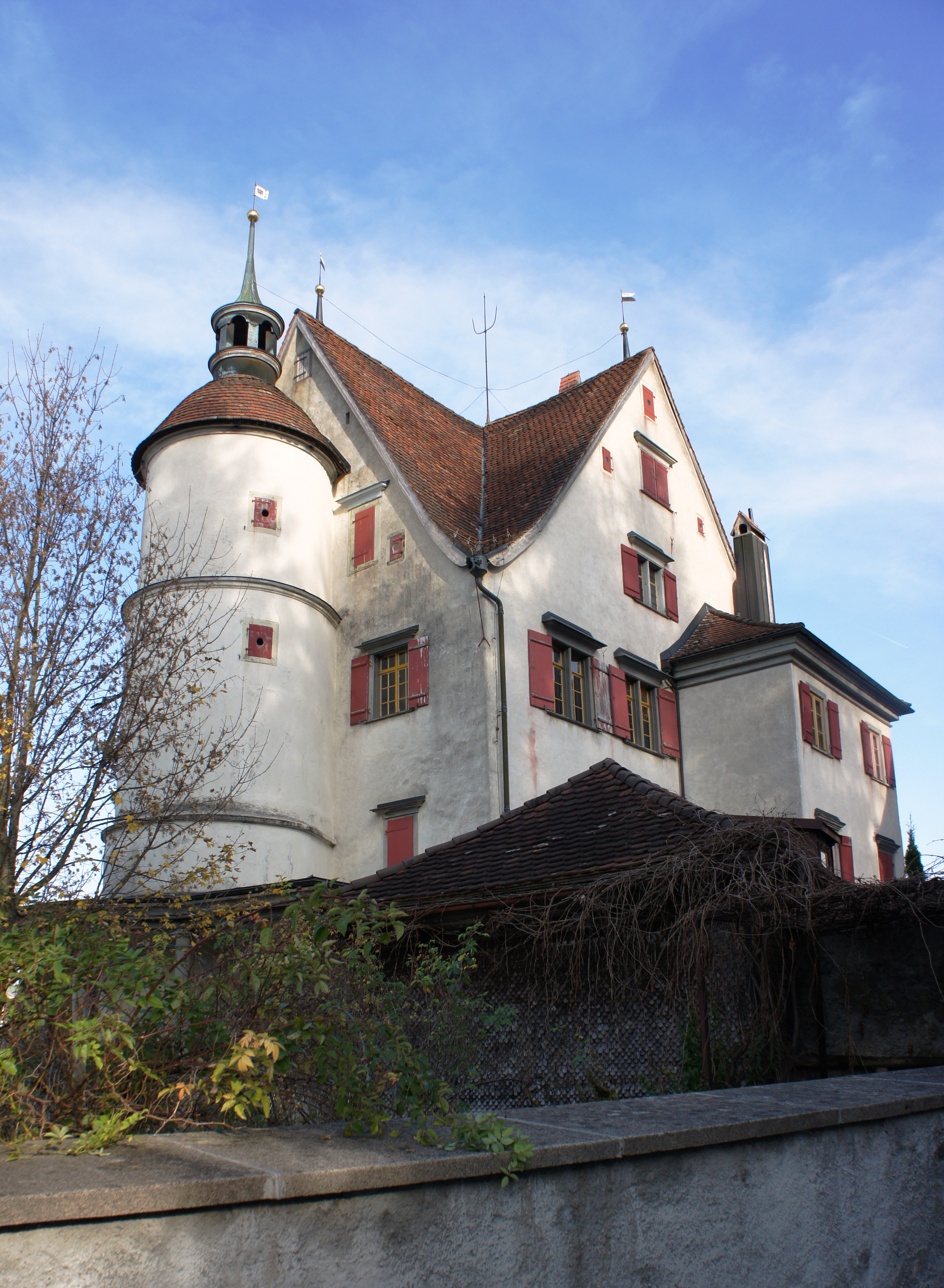

Site information
- Code: CH-AI

Location
- Coordinates: 47.329947°N 9.409615°E

Site history
- Built: 1563
- Materials: stone

Appenzell Castle (German: Schloss von Appenzell) is a castle in the Appenzell District of the canton of Appenzell Innerrhoden in Switzerland. It is one of a few 16th century stone buildings in Appenzell. It is part of the Swiss heritage site of national significance.

== History ==
The castle was built in 1563 as an elegant mansion by doctor Antoni Löw.

Löw was an enthusiastic supporter of the Protestant Reformation in Appenzell. In 1584 he was captured, judged and sentenced to death by the local Catholics for accusing a priest of "sodomy with a boy", while the accused fled the country to prevent his examination and a Catholic earwitness claimed to have heard nothing.

After Löw's decapitation the castle was taken by the town and given to the Franciscans. They remained in the castle for almost a century, until 1682 when they moved into the newly completed St. Mary of the Angels. When the Franciscans moved out, the castle was sold to Antoni Speck who owned it until his death in 1708. It then passed to Johann Baptist Fortunat and then into the possession of the Sutter family. On 15 February 1875 Doctor Anton Alfred Sutter became the sole owner of the castle. He established his practice in the castle, leading to it being known as the "Doctor's House". Today the castle remains the property of the Sutter family.

== See also ==
List of castles and fortresses in Switzerland
