= Schwende-Rüte =

Schwende-Rüte District Bezirk Schwende-Rüte
- District
- Flag Coat of arms
- Coordinates: 47°18′N 9°25′E
- Country: Switzerland
- Canton: Appenzell Innerrhoden

Area
  - Total: 9,833 km^{2} (3,797 sq mi)
- Elevation: 1,256 m (4,121 ft)

Population (December 2020)
  - Total: 6,006
  - Density: 0.6108/km^{2} (1.582/sq mi)
- Time zone: UTC+1 (CET)
  - Summer (DST): UTC+2 (CEST)
- Postal code: Schwende: 9057; Rüte: 9050
- SFOS number: 3112
- Municipalities: None
- Website: schwende-ruete.ch

Schwende-Rüte District is a district of the canton of Appenzell Innerrhoden in Switzerland.

== History ==
Schwende-Rüte is formed on 1 May 2022 after the merger the districts of Rüte and Schwende.

== Name ==
The name refers to the two former municipalities.
