= Wildkirchli =

Swiss cultural property of national significance in Schwende

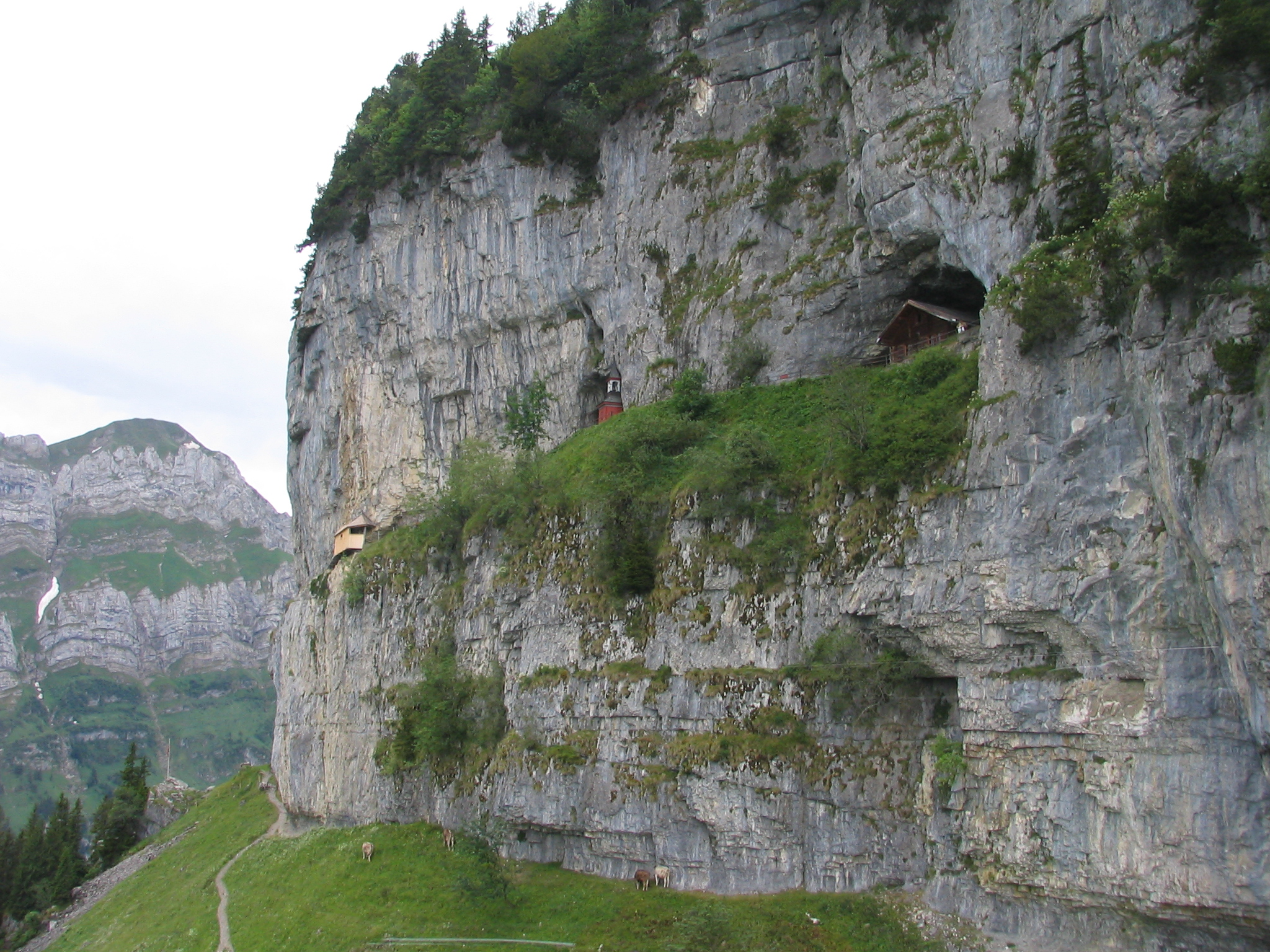

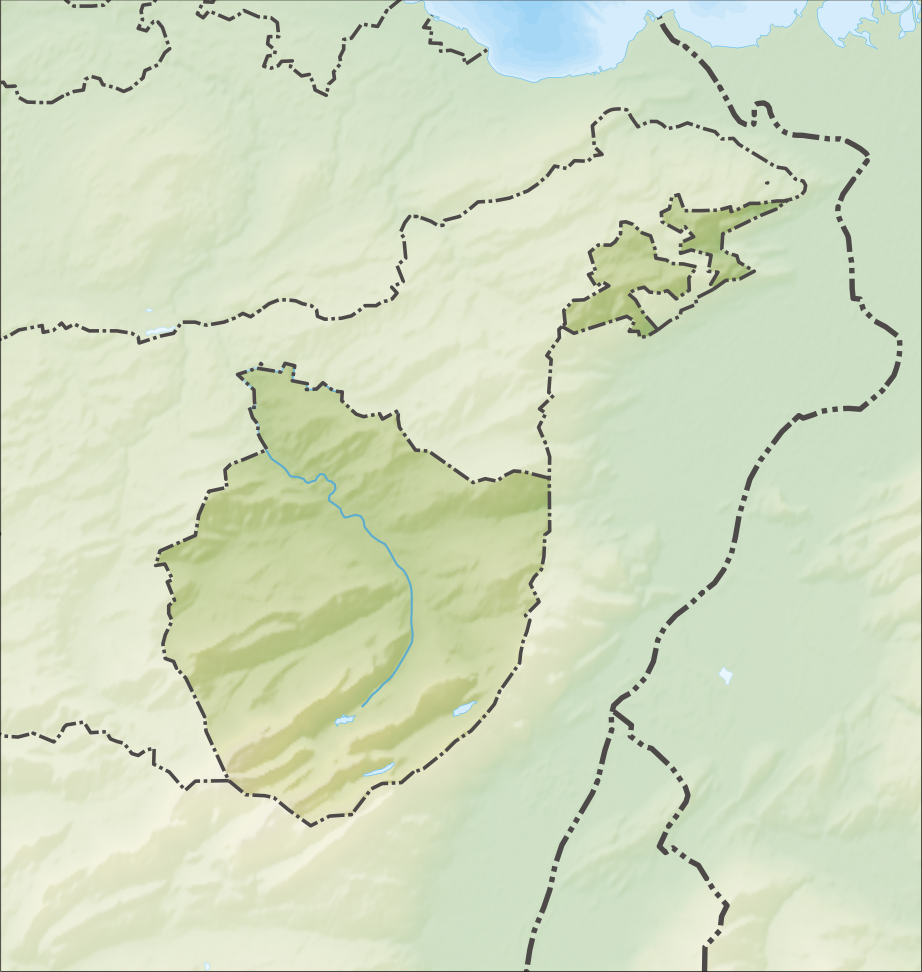
- Location in Switzerland Location in the canton of Appenzell Innerrhoden
- 47°16′55″N 9°24′29″E
- Periods: Paleolithic
- Associated with: Neanderthal
- Location: Alpstein massif
- Region: Appenzell Innerrhoden

Site notes
- Archaeologists: Emil Bächler

Wildkirchli (lit. 'Wild Chapel') are three interlinked caves situated in the Alpstein massif in the Appenzell Innerrhoden canton of Switzerland, north-east of Mount Säntis Switzerland. The caves are located at a height of 1,477–1,500 m (4,846–4,921 ft). They are notable for the traces of Paleolithic Neanderthal habitation, dating to c. 40,000 BP, and cave bear bones dating to 90,000–40,000 BP. A museum at the site houses a full bear skeleton that was found in one of the caves.

== Geography and transport ==
There are three caves, the Altarhöhle (lit. 'altar cave'), the Untere Höhle ("lower cave"), and the Obere Höhle ("upper cave"), located on the Ebenalp, which is the northernmost summit of the Appenzell Alps. They sit at a height of 1,477–1,500 metres (4,846–4,921 ft), and are reached by cable car from Wasserauen to the top of Ebenalp, followed by a 15-minute hike down the mountain. Wasserauen railway station is served by regional trains from/to Herisau/Gossau, which are both served by long-distance trains.

== History of the caves ==
The earliest-known documentation of the cave was a visit by a cave explorers' club, the Höhlenklub of Appenzell, in 1863. In 1658, Paulus Ulmann (1613–1680), a priest in Appenzell, founded a chapel in the lower cave and established a hermitage in the upper cave. A series of hermits inhabited the site, and provided food and lodging to pilgrims who visited the chapel. The last hermit died in 1851, and the hermitage was eventually transformed into an inn. A small museum which is a recreation of the hermits' house was built on the site of the old inn.

The cave chapel and pilgrimage were the subject of one chapter of Joseph Victor von Scheffel's Ekkehard: A Tale of the Tenth Century, Volume II.

== Archaeological finds in the caves ==
Many bones have been found in the caves; the hermits sold them to pilgrims. In 1903–1908, Emil Bächler discovered flint tools in the Altarhöhle. Their identification as Mousterian was the first demonstration of Neanderthal man in the Appenzell Alps. Later excavations revealed three stratigraphic layers in the Altarhöhle. The lowest layer (90,000–40,000 BP) contained primarily cave bear bones. The upper layer contained the flint tools and was dated to the final phase of the Mousterian (about 40 000 BC). The layer also contained bones from animals such as chamois, ibexes and wolves, suggesting that the caves served as summer hunting sites.

== 21st century ==
Today the caves have become a tourist destination. On the same path as the caves is the Berggasthaus Aescher, a 170-year-old guesthouse built into the cliff. The guesthouse was included as one of the four most interesting restaurants by the Huffington Post and it was featured on the cover of National Geographic's "Places of a Lifetime" publication (2015).

== See also ==
- List of caves in Switzerland
- Paleolithic in Switzerland

== Literature ==
- Bächler, Emil (1940). Das alpine paläolithikum der Schweiz im Wildkirchli, Drachenloch und Wildenmannlisloch, die ältesten menschlichen niederlassungen aus der altsteinzeit des Schweizerlandes (in German). Birkhäuser.
- E. Schmid, "Zum Besuch der Wildkirchli-Höhlen", in Mitteilungsblatt der Schweizerischen Geschichte für Ur- und Frühgeschichte 8, 1977, 2-12. (in German)
