= Speicher railway station =

Railway station in Speicher, Switzerland

Speicher
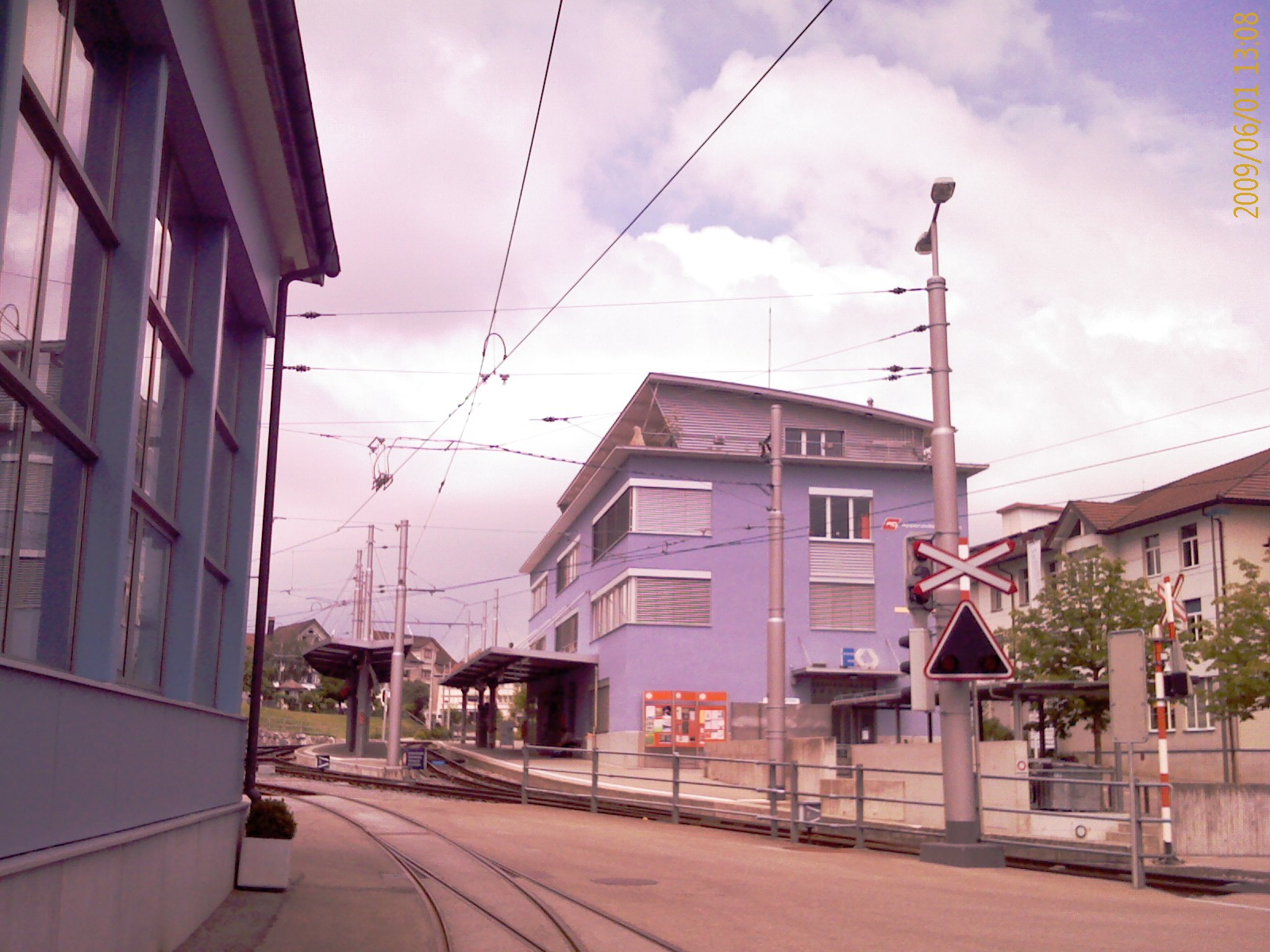
- The station building in 2009

General information
- Location: Speicher; Switzerland
- Coordinates: 47°24′40″N 9°26′35″E
- Elevation: 924 m (3,031 ft)
- Owner: Appenzell Railways
- Lines: Appenzell–St. Gallen–Trogen railway; (St. Gallen–Trogen railway until 2018)
- Train operators: Appenzell Railways
- Connections
- Bus: PostAuto bus route 190

Other information
- Fare zone: 245 (Tarifverbund Ostwind)

Services
Preceding station	St. Gallen S-Bahn	Following station
Schützengarten towards Appenzell	S20	Bendlehn towards Trogen
Schützengarten towards Appenzell	S21	Bendlehn towards Trogen
Schützengarten towards Teufen AR	S22	Bendlehn towards Trogen
Location
- Location within Switzerland Location within Canton of Appenzell Ausserrhoden

Speicher railway station (German: Bahnhof Speicher) is a railway station in Speicher, in the Swiss canton of Appenzell Ausserrhoden. It is a station on the 1,000 mm (3 ft 3 3/8 in) metre gauge Appenzell–St. Gallen–Trogen railway line (until 2018 St. Gallen–Trogen railway line) of Appenzell Railways (Appenzeller Bahnen, AB), and is served by local light rail trains only.

== Services ==
As of the December 2023 timetable change, the following services stop at Speicher:

- St. Gallen S-Bahn:
  - S20: hourly service to Appenzell, via St. Gallen and to Trogen (peak-hour service, only calls at Niederteufen, Teufen AR and Bühler between St. Gallen and Gais).
  - S21: half-hourly service to Appenzell, via St. Gallen and to Trogen.
  - S22: hourly service to Teufen AR, via St. Gallen and to Trogen (peak-hour only).

== See also ==
- Rail transport in Switzerland
