= Lustmühle railway station =

Train station in the canton of Appenzell Ausserrhoden, Switzerland

Lustmühle

General information
- Location: Teufen; Canton of Appenzell Ausserrhoden, Switzerland
- Coordinates: 47°24′00″N 9°21′32″E
- Elevation: 775 m (2,543 ft)
- Lines: Appenzell–St. Gallen–Trogen railway; (St. Gallen-Gais-Appenzell railway until 2018)
- Platforms: 2 side platforms
- Tracks: 2
- Train operators: Appenzell Railways
- Connections
- Bus: PostAuto bus route 180

Other information
- Fare zone: 211 (Tarifverbund Ostwind)

Services
Preceding station	St. Gallen S-Bahn	Following station
Niederteufen towards Appenzell	S21	St. Gallen Riethüsli towards Trogen
Niederteufen towards Teufen AR	S22	St. Gallen Riethüsli towards Trogen
Location
- Location within Switzerland Location within Canton of Appenzell Ausserrhoden

Lustmühle station is a railway station in the Ortschaft of Lustmühle in the municipality of Teufen, in the canton of Appenzell Ausserrhoden, Switzerland. It is located along Hauptstrasse on the 1,000 mm (3 ft 3 3/8 in) Appenzell–St. Gallen–Trogen line of Appenzell Railways (Appenzeller Bahnen, AB), and is served by local light rail trains only.

== Services ==
Only S-Bahn services call at Lustmühle (stop only on request). As of the December 2024 timetable change, the station is served by the following services:

- St. Gallen S-Bahn:
  - S21: half-hourly service between Appenzell and Trogen, via St. Gallen.
  - S22: rush-hour service between Teufen AR and Trogen, via St. Gallen.

== See also ==
- Rail transport in Switzerland
