= Gfeld railway station =

Train station in the city of St. Gallen, Switzerland

Gfeld

General information
- Location: Trogen; Canton of Appenzell Ausserrhoden, Switzerland
- Coordinates: 47°24′18″N 9°27′22″E
- Elevation: 917 m (3,009 ft)
- Lines: Appenzell–St. Gallen–Trogen railway; (St. Gallen–Trogen railway until 2018)
- Platforms: 1 side platform
- Tracks: 1
- Train operators: Appenzell Railways

Other information
- Fare zone: 245 (Tarifverbund Ostwind)

Services
Preceding station	St. Gallen S-Bahn	Following station
Schützengarten towards Appenzell	S20	Trogen Terminus
Schützengarten towards Appenzell	S21	Trogen Terminus
Schützengarten towards Teufen AR	S22	Trogen Terminus
Location
- Location within Switzerland Location within Canton of Appenzell Ausserrhoden

Gfeld station is a railway station in the municipality of Trogen, in the canton of Appenzell Ausserrhoden, Switzerland. It is located along St. Gallerstrasse on the 1,000 mm (3 ft 3 3/8 in) Appenzell–St. Gallen–Trogen line of Appenzell Railways (Appenzeller Bahnen, AB), and is served by local light rail trains only.

== Services ==
Only S-Bahn services call at Gfeld (stop only on request). As of the December 2024 timetable change, the station is served by the following services:

- St. Gallen S-Bahn:
  - S20: rush-hour service between Appenzell and Trogen, via St. Gallen (only calls at Niederteufen, Teufen AR and Bühler between St. Gallen and Gais).
  - S21: half-hourly service between Appenzell and Trogen, via St. Gallen.
  - S22: rush-hour service between Teufen AR and Trogen, via St. Gallen.

== See also ==
- Rail transport in Switzerland
