= Steigbach railway station =

Train station in the canton of Appenzell Ausserrhoden, Switzerland

Steigbach
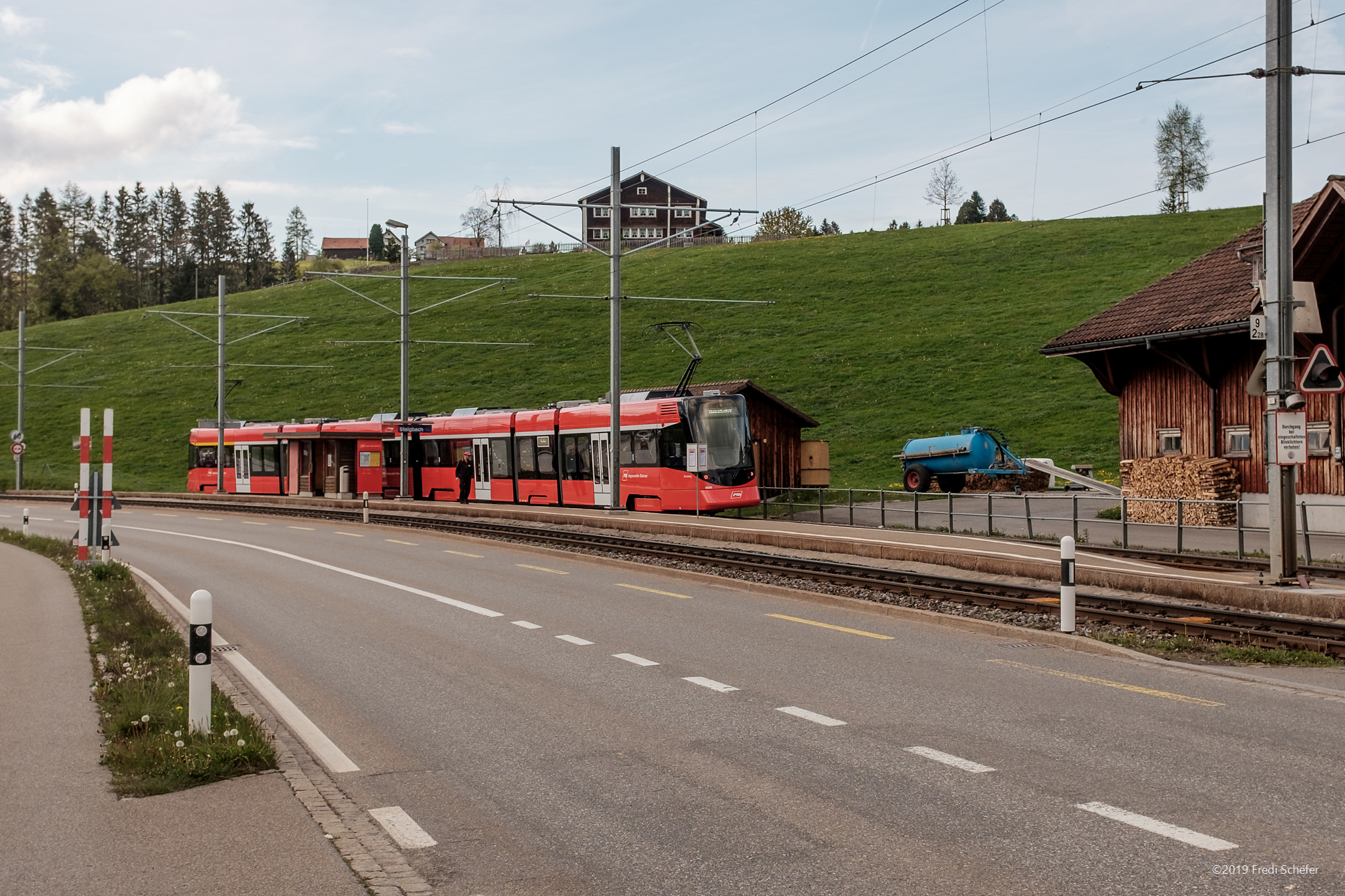
- An ABe 8/12 of AB at the station

General information
- Location: Bühler; Canton of Appenzell Ausserrhoden, Switzerland
- Coordinates: 47°22′37″N 9°24′18″E
- Elevation: 814 m (2,671 ft)
- Lines: Appenzell–St. Gallen–Trogen railway; (St. Gallen-Gais-Appenzell railway until 2018)
- Platforms: 1 island platform
- Tracks: 2
- Train operators: Appenzell Railways

Other information
- Fare zone: 245 (Tarifverbund Ostwind)

Services
Preceding station	St. Gallen S-Bahn	Following station
Bühler towards Appenzell	S21	Teufen AR towards Trogen
Location
- Location within Switzerland Location within Canton of Appenzell Ausserrhoden

Steigbach station is a railway station in the municipality of Bühler, in the canton of Appenzell Ausserrhoden, Switzerland. It is located along Bühlerstrasse on the 1,000 mm (3 ft 3 3/8 in) Appenzell–St. Gallen–Trogen line of Appenzell Railways (Appenzeller Bahnen, AB), and is served by local light rail trains only.

== Services ==
Only S-Bahn services call at Steigbach (stop only on request). As of the December 2024 timetable change, the station is served by the following services:

- St. Gallen S-Bahn S21: half-hourly service between Appenzell and Trogen, via St. Gallen.

== See also ==
- Rail transport in Switzerland
