= Speicher, Switzerland =

Municipality in Appenzell Ausserrhoden, Switzerland

Speicher
- Municipality
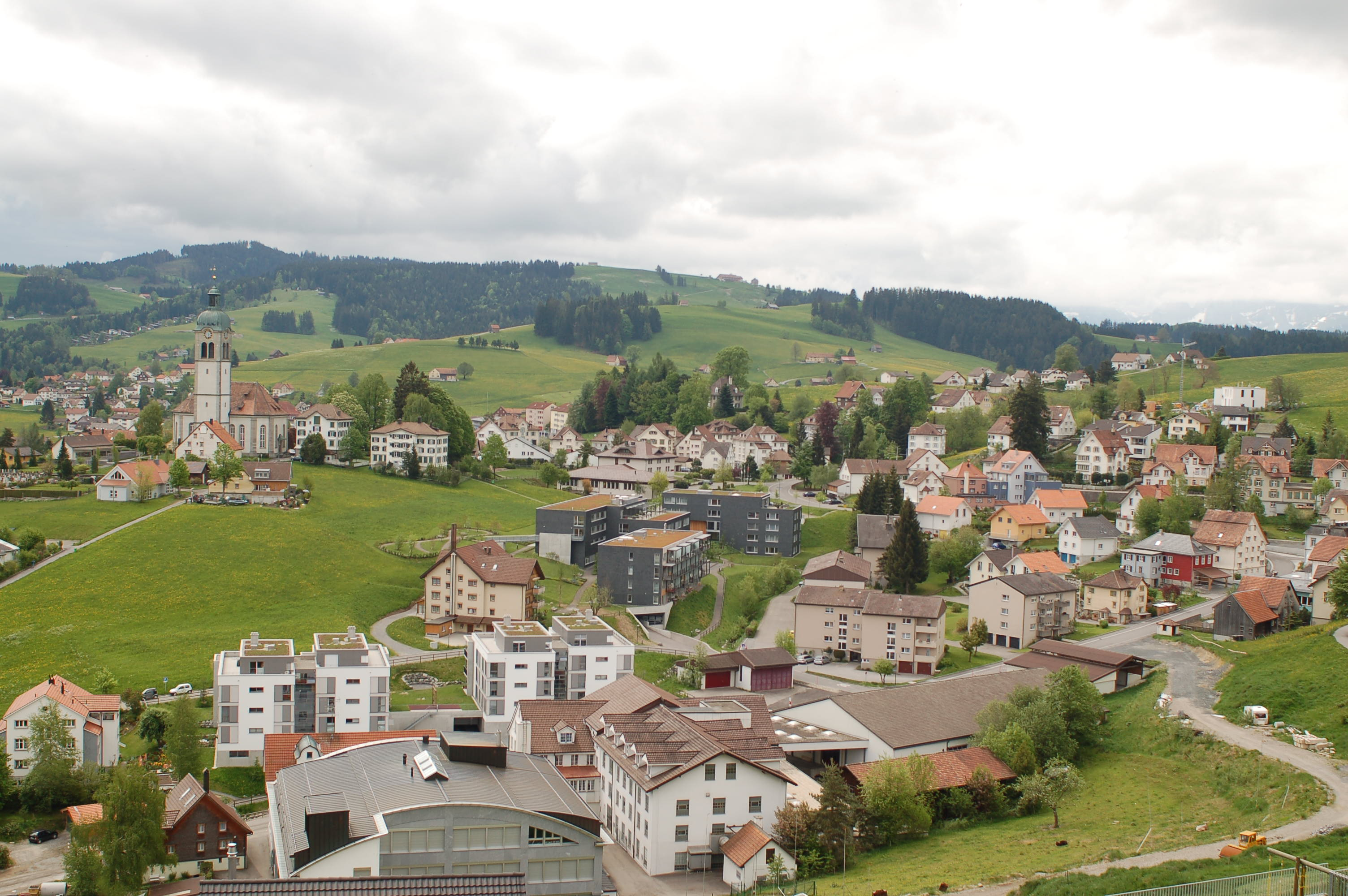

- Flag Coat of arms
- Location of Speicher
- Location within Switzerland Location within Canton of Appenzell Ausserrhoden
- Coordinates: 47°24′N 9°26′E
- Country: Switzerland
- Canton: Appenzell Ausserrhoden
- District: n.a.

Area
  - Total: 8.21 km^{2} (3.17 sq mi)
- Elevation: 924 m (3,031 ft)

Population (December 2008)
  - Total: 4,012
  - Density: 489/km^{2} (1,270/sq mi)
- Time zone: UTC+01:00 (CET)
  - Summer (DST): UTC+02:00 (CEST)
- Postal code: 9042
- SFOS number: 3023
- ISO 3166 code: CH-AR
- Surrounded by: Bühler, Eggersriet (SG), Rehetobel, St. Gallen (SG), Teufen, Trogen
- Website: www.speicher.ch

Speicher (Swiss Standard German pronunciation: [ˈʃpaɪçər]) is a municipality in the canton of Appenzell Ausserrhoden, in Switzerland.

== History ==
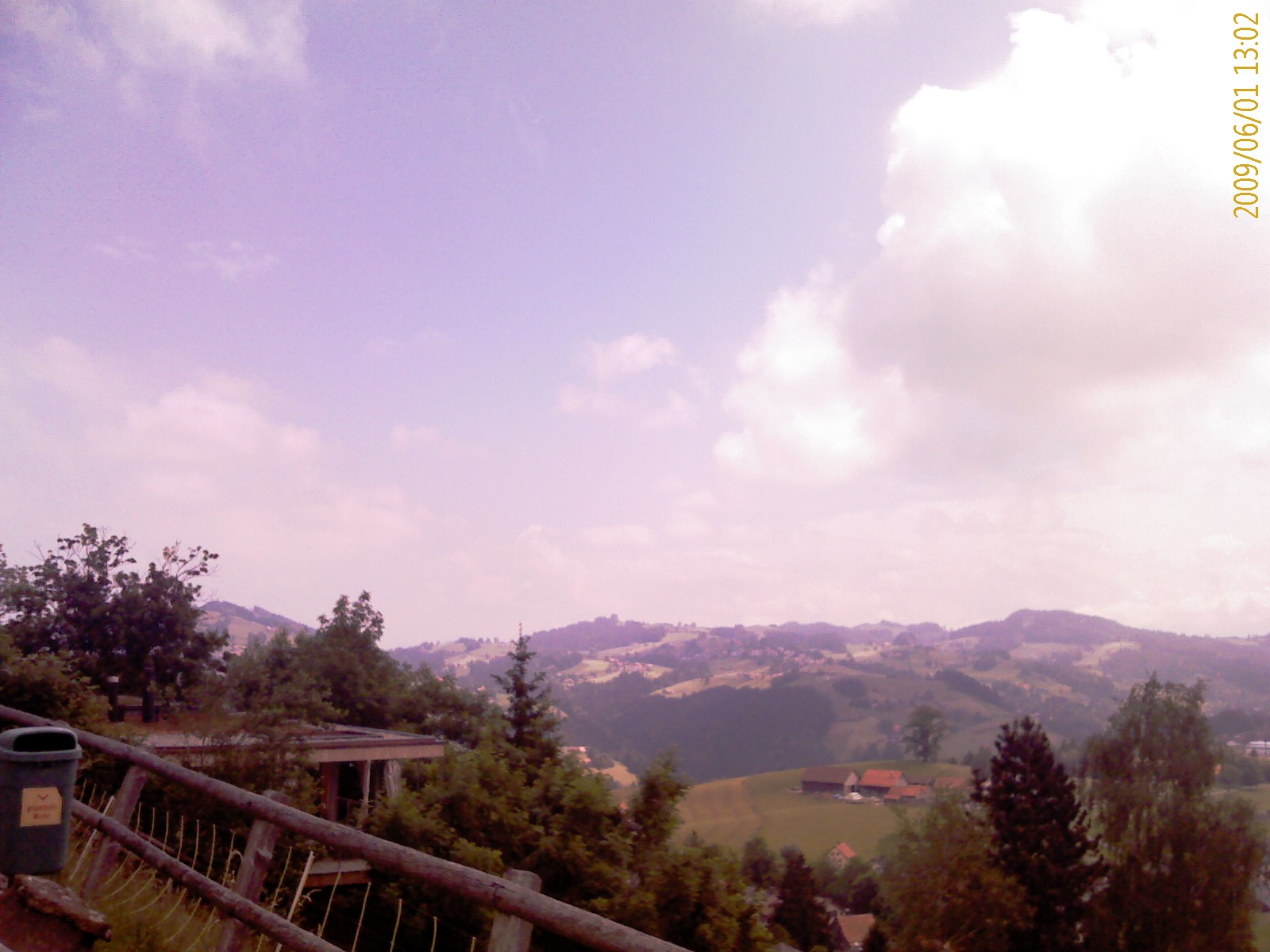
View from the Vögelinsegg

Aerial view from 200 m by Walter Mittelholzer (1923)

Speicher is first mentioned in 1309 as Spicher. The name originated in the Middle Ages, during the heyday of the Abbey of Saint Gall. At that time the village church served as a granary of the monastery. The first battle of the Appenzell Wars was fought at the village of Vögelinsegg, near Speicher in 1403. A monument to the battle, a pointing Appenzell farmer with a morning star, was built in 1903 on the ridge of Vögelinsegg.

A right of way had to be blasted through the rock at Vögelinsegg to lay the track for the Trogenerbahn in 1900.

== Geography ==
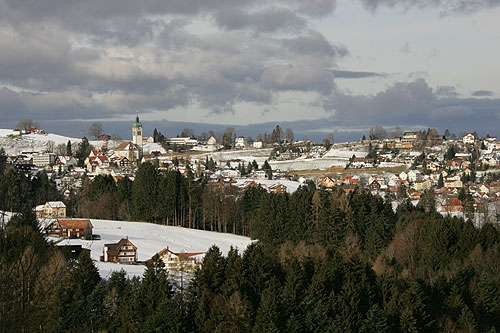
Speicher

Speicher has an area, as of 2006, of 8.21 km^{2} (3.17 sq mi). Of this area, 54.8% is used for agricultural purposes, while 28.6% is forested. Of the rest of the land, 16.1% is settled (buildings or roads) and the remainder (0.5%) is non-productive (rivers, glaciers or mountains).

The municipality is located in the former District of Mittelland. Until the 1950s the municipality was lightly settled with scattered farmhouses and two small settlements, Speicher and Speicherschwendi. Both have expanded into larger villages since then.

== Demographics ==
Speicher has a population (as of 2008) of 4,012, of which about 8.5% are foreign nationals. Over the last 10 years the population has grown at a rate of 1.8%. Most of the population (as of 2000) speaks German (93.5%), with Spanish being second most common ( 1.3%) and Albanian being third ( 0.9%).

As of 2000, the gender distribution of the population was 49.5% male and 50.5% female. The age distribution, as of 2000, in Speicher is; 298 people or 7.7% of the population are between 0–6 years old. 477 people or 12.4% are 6-15, and 190 people or 4.9% are 16-19. Of the adult population, 164 people or 4.3% of the population are between 20–24 years old. 1,104 people or 28.7% are 25-44, and 1,077 people or 28.0% are 45-64. The senior population distribution is 405 people or 10.5% of the population are between 65–79 years old, and 138 people or 3.6% are over 80.

In the 2007 federal election the FDP received 72.2% of the vote.

In Speicher about 78% of the population (between age 25-64) have completed either non-mandatory upper secondary education or additional higher education (either university or a Fachhochschule).

Speicher has an unemployment rate of 1.2%. As of 2005, there were 86 people employed in the primary economic sector and about 34 businesses involved in this sector. 256 people are employed in the secondary sector and there are 47 businesses in this sector. 617 people are employed in the tertiary sector, with 156 businesses in this sector.

The historical population is given in the following table:

Historical population
Year	Pop.	±%
1667	908	—
1734	1,634	+80.0%
1910	3,315	+102.9%
1941	2,137	−35.5%
1990	3,789	+77.3%
2000	3,953	+4.3%
2005	3,921	−0.8%
2007	3,953	+0.8%

== Education ==
Speicher is home to five kindergartens, one primary school and a secondary school. Students who continue on to advanced secondary attend Gymnasium in Trogen.

== Sights ==
The Holzpalast house in the municipality is listed as a heritage site of national significance.

== Sports ==
- Tennis Hall
- Indoor swimming pool with gym
- Sports facilities with artificial turf skate park and outdoor handball field
- Beach volleyball
- Various sports clubs: FC-Speicher, TV-Speicher, Uni hockey, tennis club
- Cross-country ski in the winter
- Vita-Parcours

== Transport ==
Speicher is linked to the city of St. Gallen and Appenzell by the Appenzell–St. Gallen–Trogen railway, a narrow-gauge road-side railway line. The line operates two trains per hour throughout the day, with four trains per hour during peak periods. Services are operated by Appenzell Railways for S-Bahn St. Gallen. There are four stations within the municipality, Bendlehn, Schützengarten, Speicher and Vögelinsegg. The journey from Speicher to St. Gallen takes 28 minutes and all the way to Appenzell 67 minutes.
