= Appenzell–St. Gallen–Trogen railway line =

Tramway in Switzerland

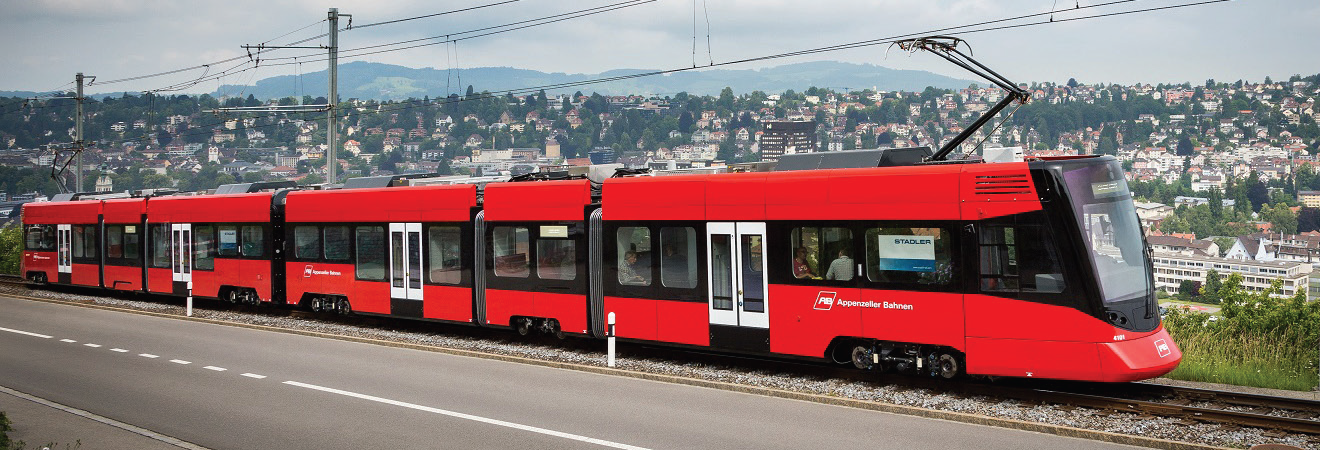
- ABe 8/12 between Schülerhaus and Notkersegg, St. Gallen behind

Overview
- Native name: Durchmesserlinie
- Line number: 855
- Locale: Switzerland
- Termini: Appenzell; Trogen

Technical
- Line length: 29.72 km (18.47 mi)
- Track gauge: 1,000 mm (3 ft 3 3/8 in)
- Minimum radius: 25 metres (82 ft)
- Electrification: Appenzell–St. Gallen: 1500 V DC; St. Gallen–Schülerhaus: 600 V DC; Schülerhaus–Trogen: 1500 V DC; Overhead lines
- Maximum incline: 8.0%
Route map
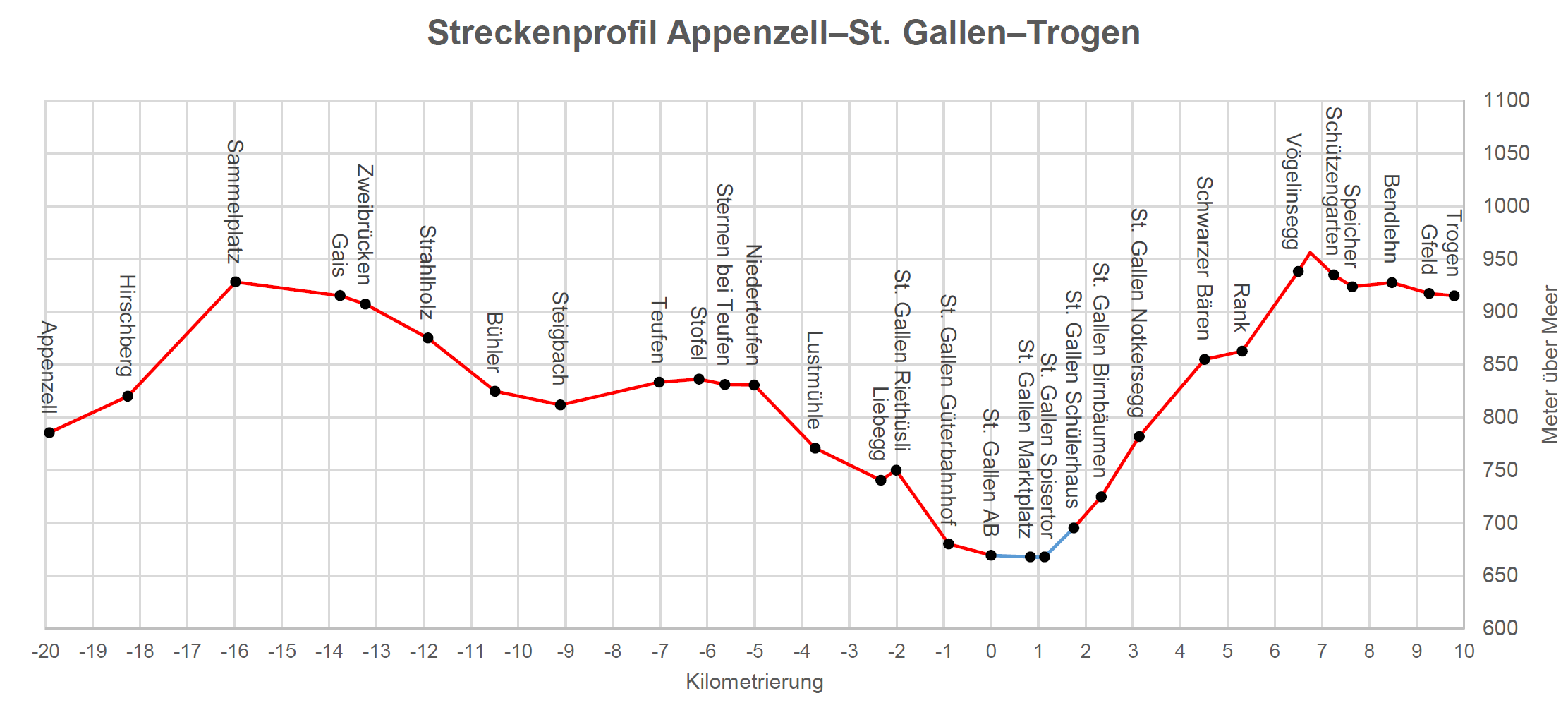
Simplified route profile: blue: tram section in urban St. Gallen
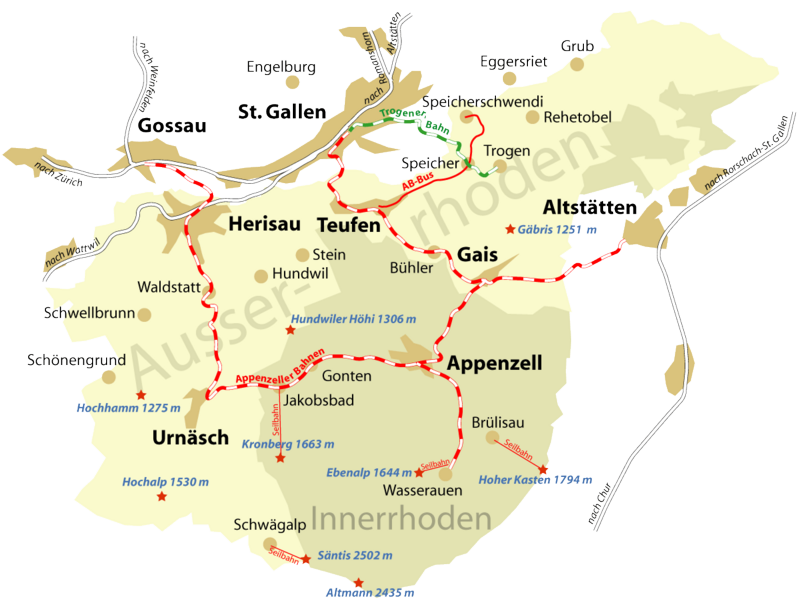

The Appenzell–St. Gallen–Trogen railway line, also known as the Durchmesserlinie (lit. 'diameter line'), is a metre gauge interurban tramway in the Swiss cantons of Appenzell Innerrhoden and Ausserrhoden and the city of St. Gallen. It is the steepest adhesion railway in Switzerland with a gradient of up to 8.0% and forms part of the network of the Appenzell Railways (Appenzeller Bahnen, AB). The line's two branches were completed in sections between 1889 and 1904 by the St. Gallen-Gais-Appenzell-Altstätten Railway and the Trogen Railway. The two lines were connected by the AB with a cross-city route through St. Gallen in 2018. The line is operated by light rails of AB, which run as S20, S21 and S22 services of the St. Gallen S-Bahn.

== S20, S21, S22 routes ==
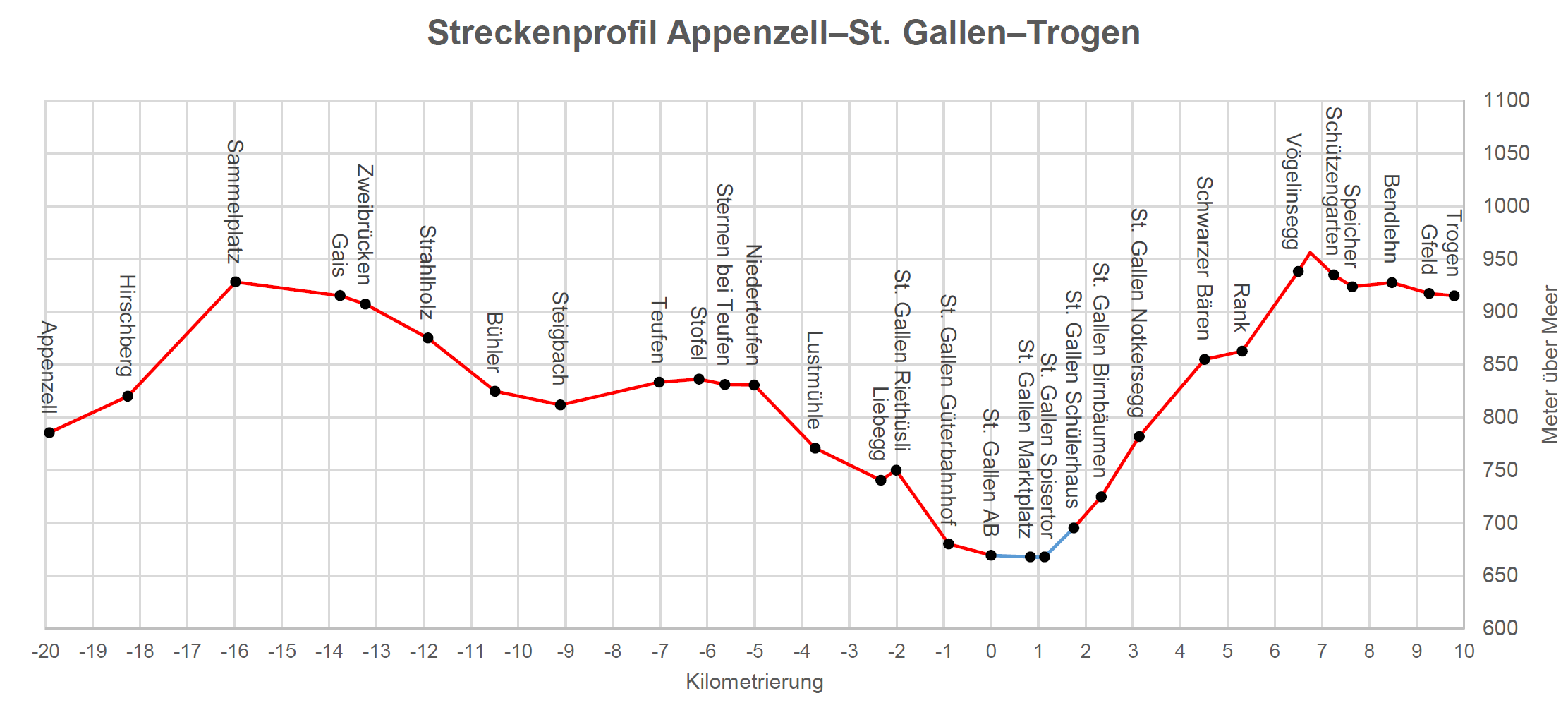
Appenzell–St. Gallen–Trogen distance profile (in kilometers), with elevation (meters above sea level)

S-Bahn services S20, S21 and S22 of St. Gallen S-Bahn use the Appenzell–St. Gallen–Trogen railway line. Their routes and operations are as follows:

S20 Trogen – St. Gallen – Teufen AR – Appenzell (peak-hour only; only calls at Niederteufen, Teufen AR and Bühler between St. Gallen and Gais)

S21 Trogen – St. Gallen – Teufen AR – Appenzell

S22 Trogen – St. Gallen – Teufen AR (peak-hour only)

The S21 service is also part of the Bodensee S-Bahn.

=== Stations ===
- Trogen
- Gfeld (stops only on request)
- Bendlehn (stops only on request)
- Speicher
- Schützengarten (stops only on request)
- Vögelinsegg (stops only on request)
- Rank (stops only on request), until 2018
- Schwarzer Bären (stops only on request)
- St. Gallen Notkersegg (stops only on request)
- St. Gallen Birnbäumen (stops only on request)
- St. Gallen Schülerhaus (stops only on request)
- St. Gallen Spisertor (stops only on request)
- St. Gallen Marktplatz (stops only on request)
- St. Gallen
- St. Gallen Güterbahnhof (stops only on request), since 2021
- St. Gallen Riethüsli (stops only on request), new location since 2018
- Liebegg (passing loop)
- Lustmühle (stops only on request)
- Niederteufen (stops only on request)
- Sternen bei Teufen (stops only on request)
- Teufen AR Stofel (stops only on request)
- Teufen AR
- Steigbach (stops only on request)
- Bühler
- Strahlholz (stops only on request)
- Zweibrücken (stops only on request)
- Gais (junction with Altstätten-Gais railway)
- Sammelplatz (stops only on request)
- Hirschberg (stops only on request)
- Appenzell (junction with Gossau-Wasserauen railway)

== History ==
=== St. Gallen-Gais-Appenzell railway ===
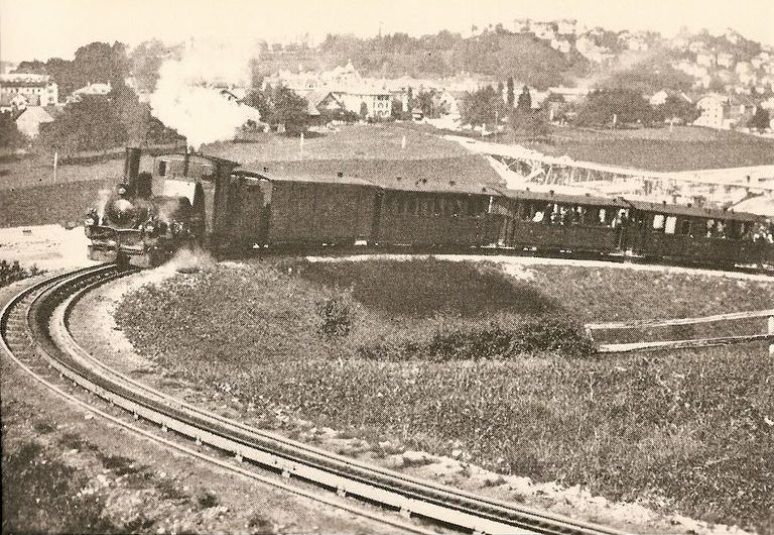
Train of the Appenzell tramway in the Ruckhalde area around 1910.

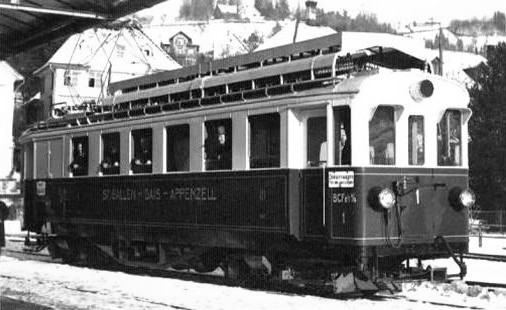
The five BCFeh 4/4 trams dominated the image of the SGA for fifty years after electrification.

The former St. Gallen-Gais-Appenzell-Altstätten-Bahn (lit. 'St. Gallen-Gais-Appenzell-Altstätten Railway', ASt) opened the line from St. Gallen to Gais, popularly known as the Gaiserbahn, on 1 October 1889. The continuation from Gais to Appenzell followed on 1 July 1904. The route had seven rack sections using the Riggenbach-Klose system with a total length of 4.9 kilometres (3.0 mi).

Electrical operations at 1500 V DC commenced on 23 January 1931 and its name was changed to St. Gallen-Gais-Appenzell-Bahn (SGA). The difficult line with tight bends demanded new design solutions to enable the BCFeh 4/4 electric railcars to operate over both adhesion and rack sections. Between 1978 and 1983, five of the six rack sections were replaced by new track allowing adhesion operations. All that remained was the nearly one kilometre-long rack section through the Ruckhalde landscape between St. Gallen and Riethüsli.

=== Trogen Railway ===
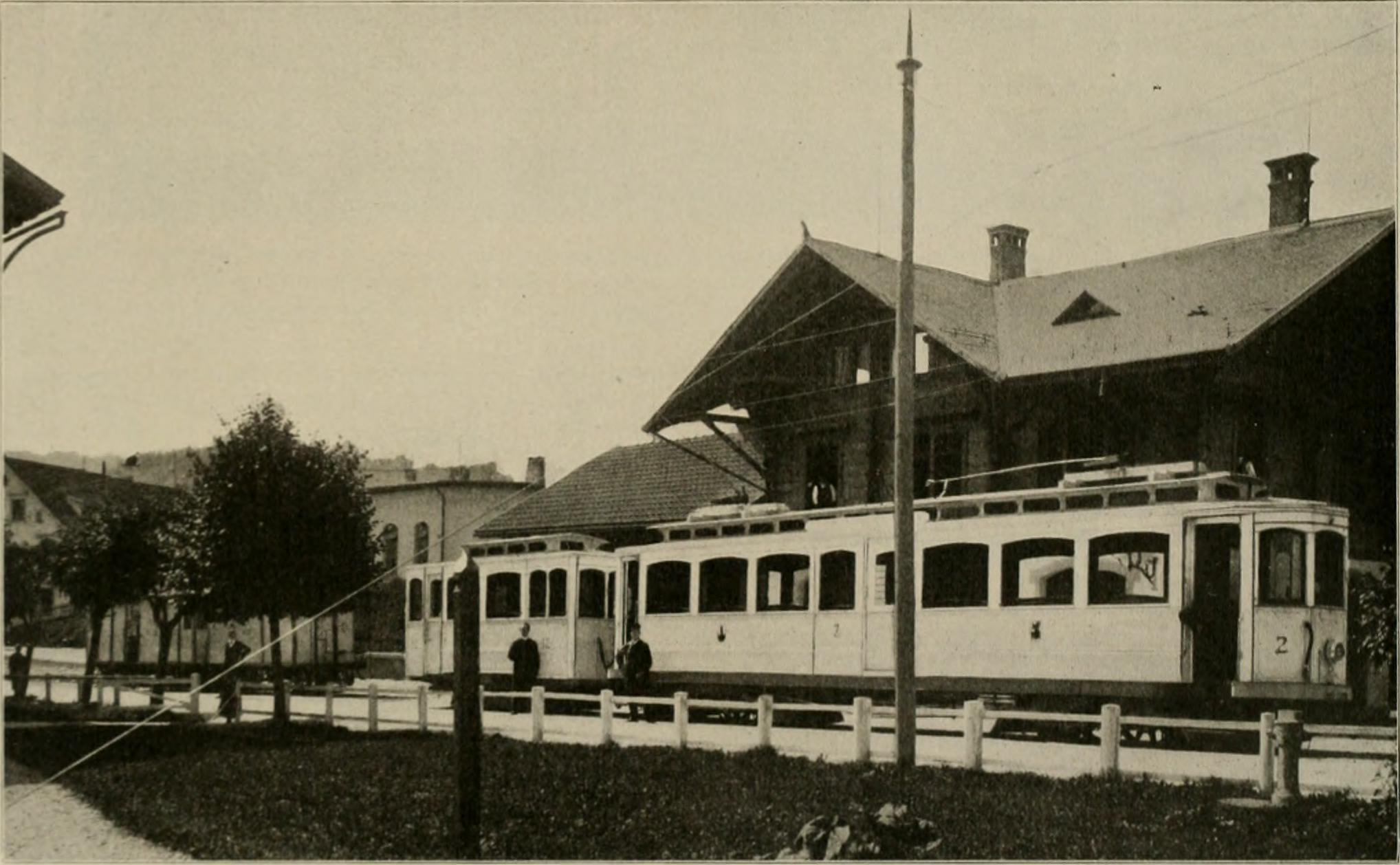
Train of the Trogen Railway in Speicher shortly after the opening of the line

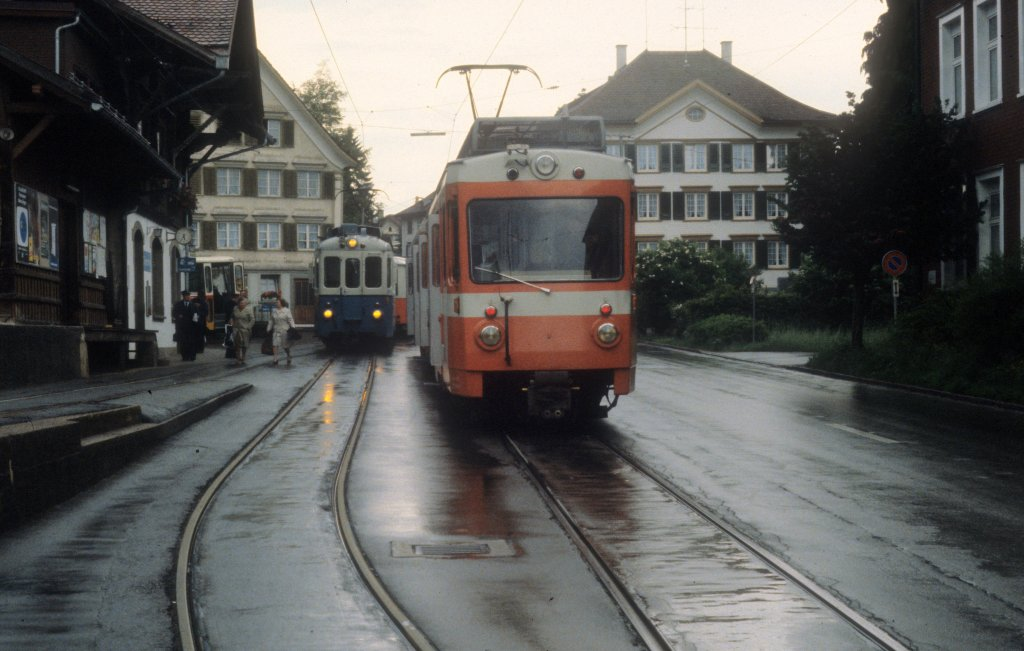
Two trains crossing in Speicher in June 1980

The St. Gallen–Trogen railway (Trogenerbahn, TB) was opened on 10 July 1903. Originally, the line was electrified at 750 volts DC. The voltage was increased to 900 volts in 1921 and finally to 1000 volts in 1928 with the replacement of the converter group in Speicher by a fully automatic mercury vapour rectifier plant. In the city of St. Gallen, the trains ran on the tracks of the St. Gallen Tramway, which was closed in 1957. Because of the intersections with the city trolleybuses, the contact wire voltage is still only 600 volts.

Despite the modest length of its operations, the Trogen Railway has been preserved. The line, which originally ran almost completely on track laid on roads, has been largely moved over the years to its own route. With a gradient of up to 7.6%, the Trogen Railway was the steepest narrow-gauge adhesion line in Switzerland prior to the opening of the Ruckhalde Tunnel.

=== Cross-city line ===
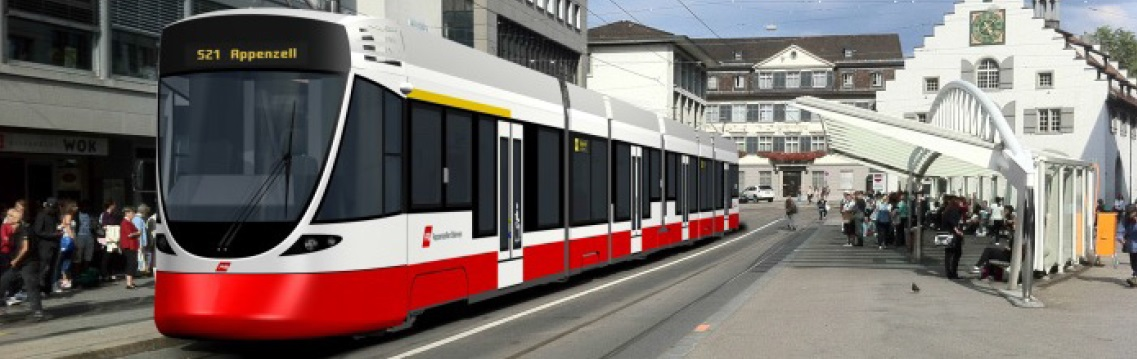
Photomontage with a Tango train from 2018 to Appenzell on the St. Gallen market square

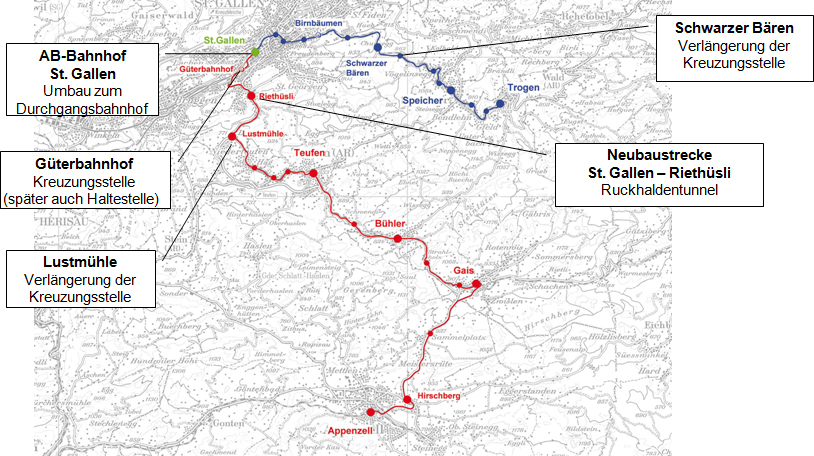
The five sub-projects that made up the cross-city line

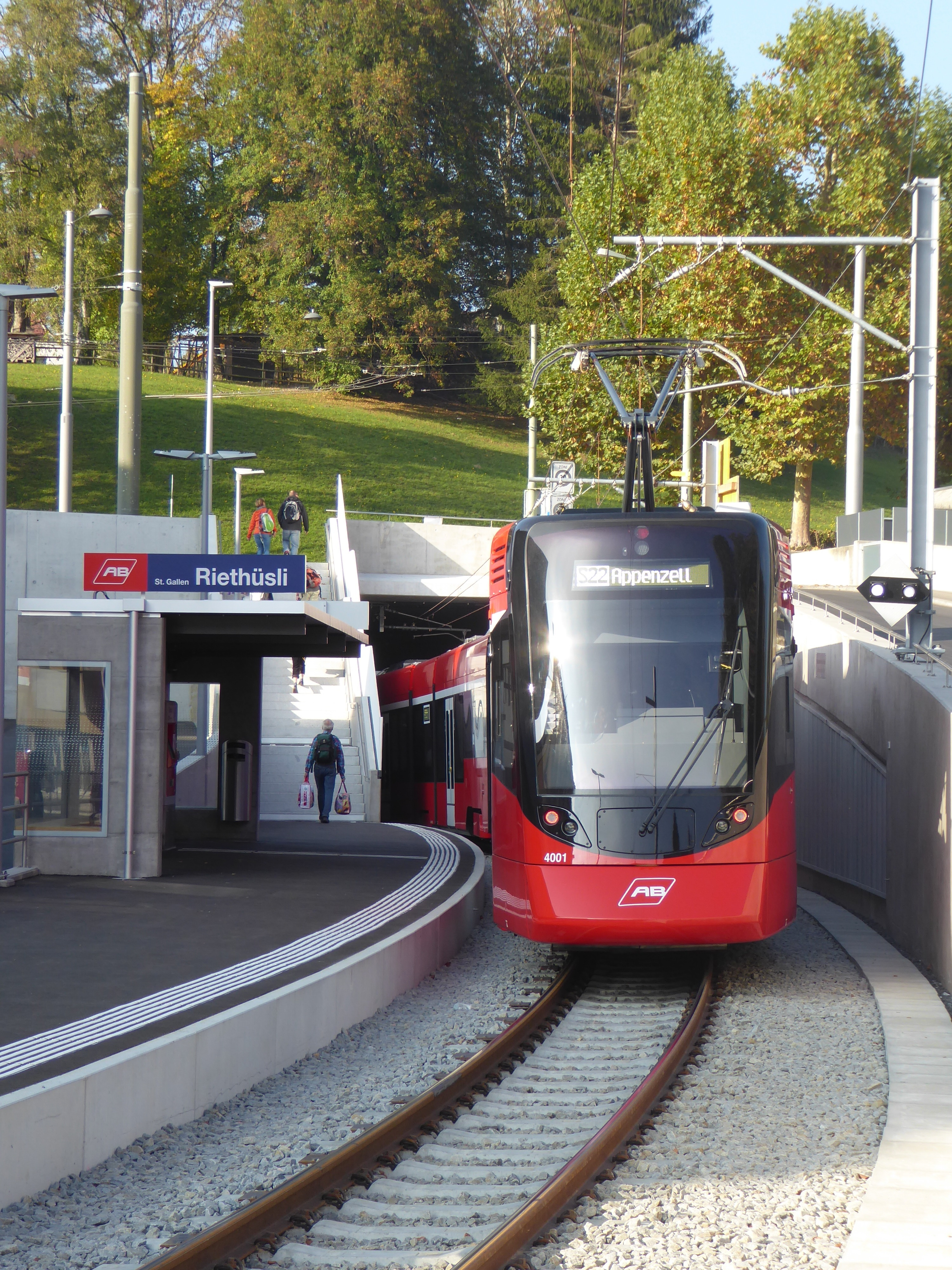
The Ruckhalde tunnel was the most important structure involved in the development of the cross-city line. South portal of the Ruckhalde tunnel and the new Riethüsli station

Since the 1970s, tunnels between St. Gallen and the suburb of Riethüsli have been planned to eliminate the last rack section between St. Gallen and Appenzell. All these projects failed on cost grounds. After the Appenzell Railways (AB) merged with the Trogen Railway (TB), the Rorschach–Heiden railway (RHB) and the Rheineck–Walzenhausen mountain railway (RhW) in 2006, the Appenzell Railways decided to increase services between St. Gallen and Teufen to 15-minute intervals. This required the shortening of the travel time between St. Gallen and Riethüsli, which was only possible with the removal of the rack section through the Ruckhalde. In order to eliminate the uneconomical service pattern of the trains in the St. Gallen "side" station (Nebenbahnhof) needed to be connected to the Appenzell–St. Gallen line of the Trogen Railway by the cross-city line, although the two track branches had very different characteristics.

The Appenzell–St. Gallen–Trogen cross-city line became a key strategic project of Appenzell Railways. The required work was subdivided into five sub-projects, of which the St. Gallen station–Riethüsli section, including the proposed Ruckhalde Tunnel, which was approximately 700-metre (2,296 ft 7 in) long, was the most complex and largest. Apart from the construction of the new track, further work was necessary. Thus, the overhead line voltage was raised to 1500 V; previously it had been 1000 V on the Trogen Railway and 1500 V on the St. Gallen-Gais-Appenzell Railway. Teufen AR station received a third platform track, so that besides the crossings of the regular interval services, trains can reverse there in the peak. The siding to St. Gallen AB station was replaced by a crossover and the double track was extended from the Rathaus (town hall) to the St. Leonhard bridge. In order to simplify operation, the seven signal boxes between Niederteufen and Trogen have been replaced by two new systems, which contain components of the SiGrid interlocking architecture, developed by Siemens. SiGrid connects the external facilities with the interlocking and supplies it with 750 Volt DC power.

The cross-city line brought significant improvements to passengers: in addition to the 15-minute cycle between St. Gallen and Teufen, connections to InterCity trains to and from Zurich have been improved. The elimination of the technically complex and expensive to operate rack section in the Ruckhalde has made it possible to use the newly acquired Tango (class ABe 8/12) low-floor trains, which are more comfortable and quieter, but also more cost-effective. The Ruckhalde Tunnel route eliminated the need for six level crossings, which has significantly increased traffic safety in the Riethüsli district.

The construction began in the spring of 2016. The cantons of St. Gallen, Appenzell Ausserrhoden and Appenzell Innerrhoden and their municipalities contributed a total of Sfr 49 million to the total costs of around SFr 90 million, with the rest being financed by the federal government. While the cross-city line had been duplicated through the St. Gallen station forecourt, the forecourt had also been under renovation since 2015. The new line was opened on 6 October 2018 for a folk festival and scheduled commercial operations began on 7 October.

Siemens used an interruption of operations to operate a digital interlocking for the first time anywhere in the world in September 2018. The signal box was operated from a Siemens location in Wallisellen on a trial basis via a public data network.

== Route description ==
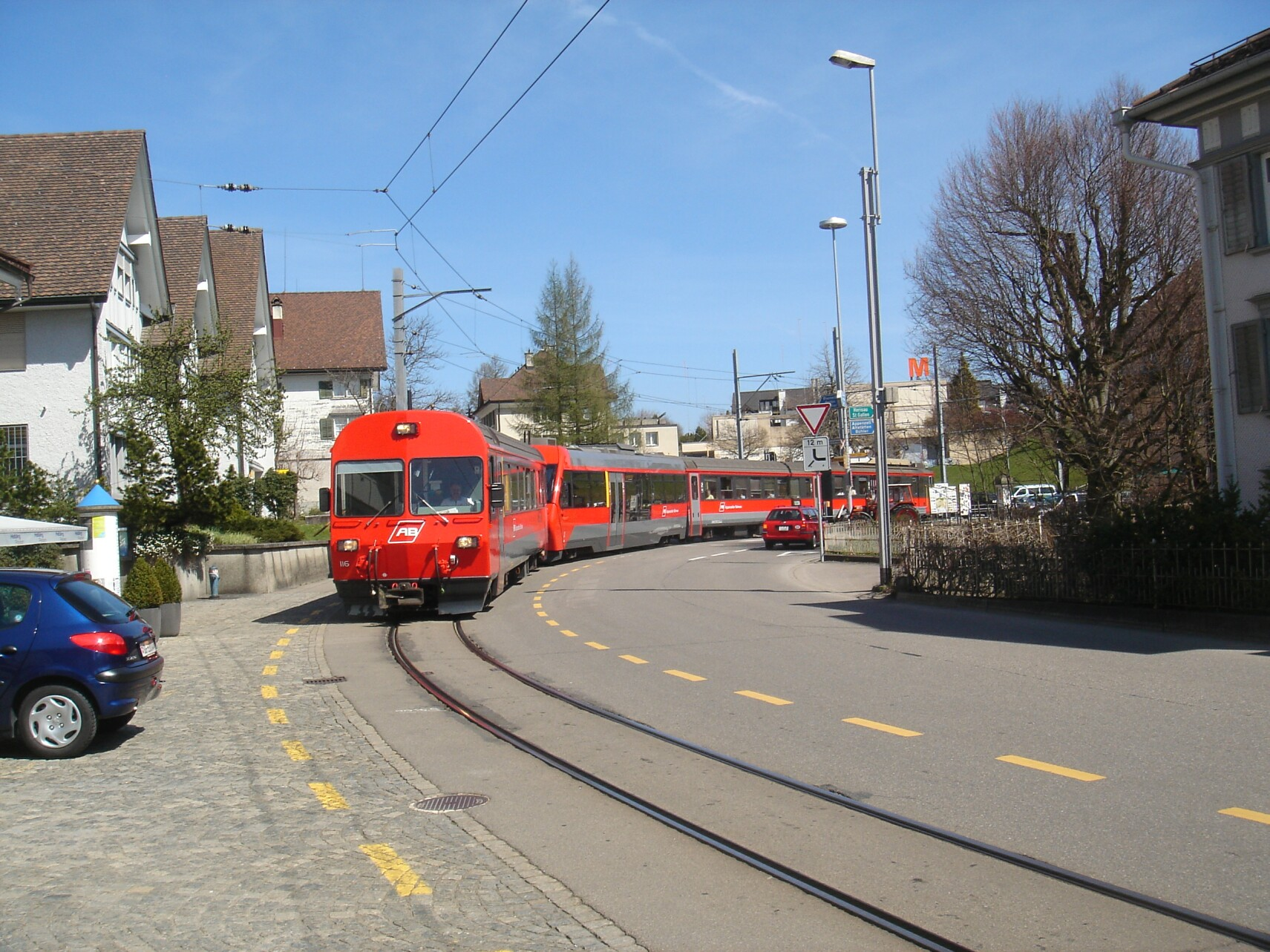
The separation of train and road is not yet completed in Teufen

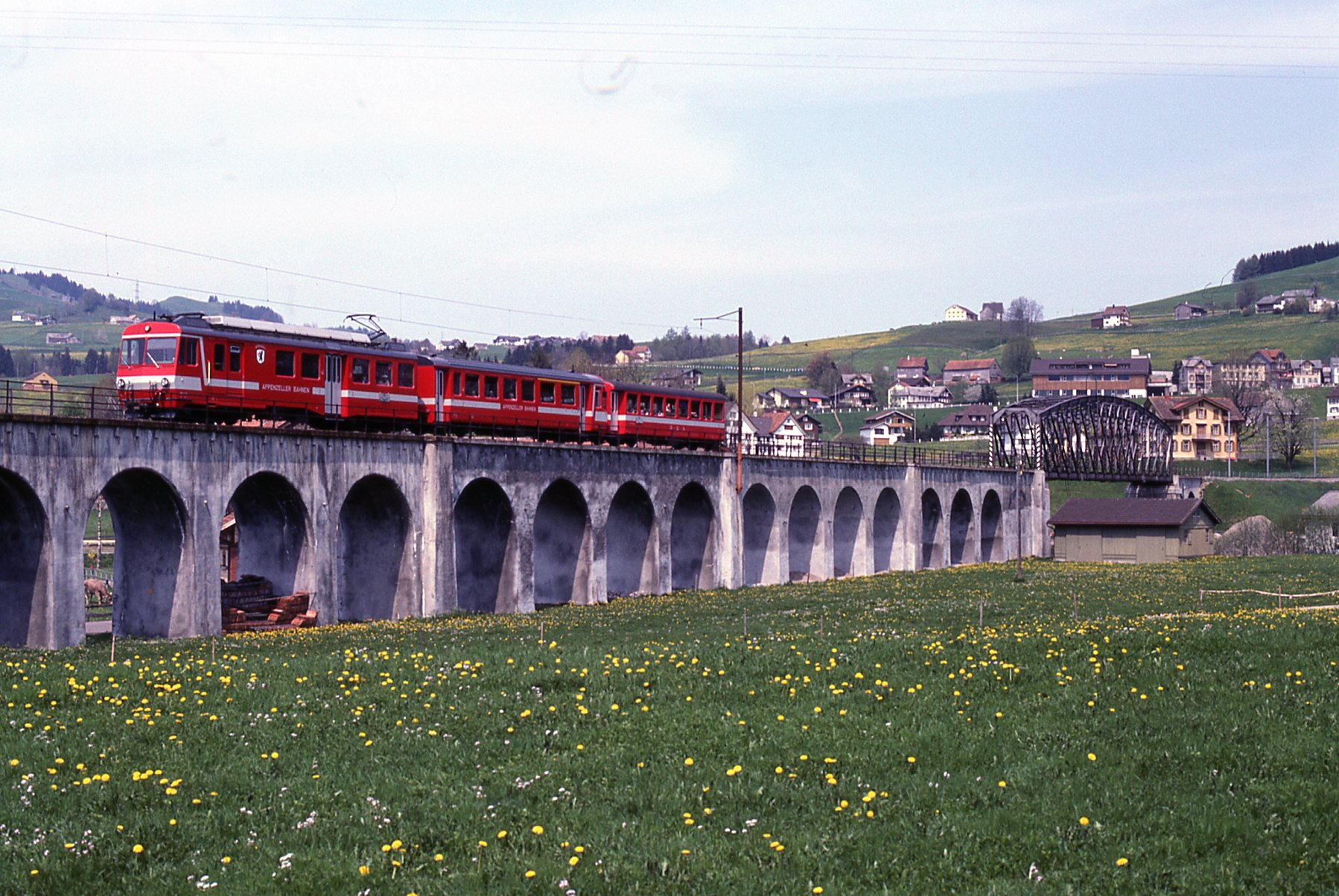
BDeh 4/4 set in 2011 on the Sitter Viaduct near Appenzell

After the line has left the Innerrhoden capital of Appenzell—which is also served by the trains of the Gossau–Wasserauen railway of the original Appenzell Railway—it runs over the 296-metre-long (971 ft 2 in) Sitter Viaduct to the Hirschberg loop, which offers views of Appenzell and the Alpstein. Running next to the road, after passing over a watershed, the railway reaches the crossing station of Sammelplatz and, after about three kilometres of down grade, the entrance of the Ausserrhoden village of Gais. The line, which is now running away from the road, takes a tight 180° curve into the station of Gais, where the trains that run over the Stoss Pass to Altstätten wait, and the depot and workshop buildings of the former SGA are located.

At the village exit, the line returns to the edge of the canton road again. On the following downslope are the stops of jZweibrücken and Strahlholz. Before the village of Bühler, the line changes to the left side of the street. The line crosses the cantonal road again on the way to Steigbach station. After the Goldibach bridge and a short climb, the line reaches the village of Teufen at the hotel "Linde". The station building, built in 1909, houses, along with retail outlets, tenants such as the cantonal police.

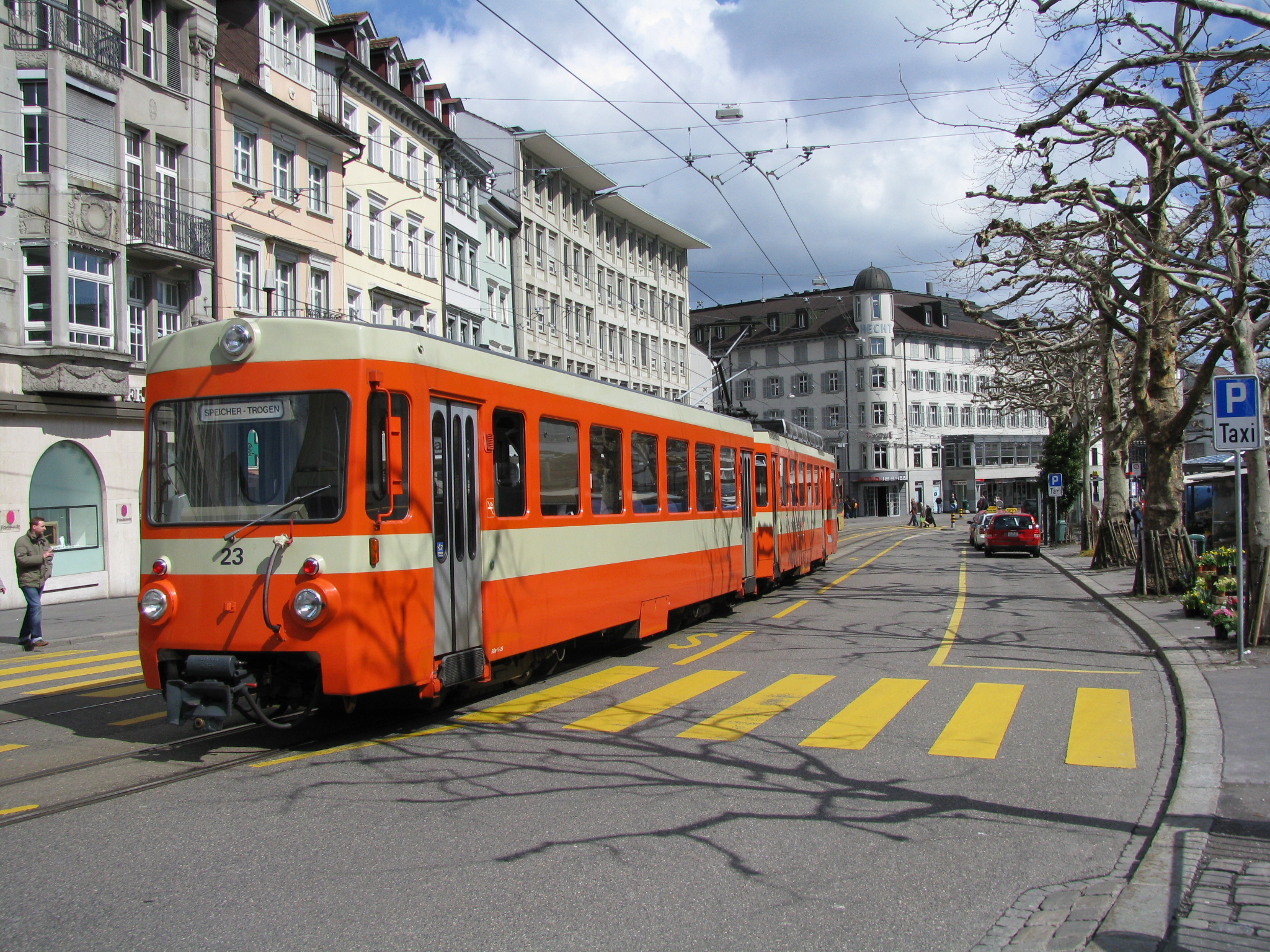
BDe 4/8 23 set in 2008 in Marktplatz in central St. Gallen

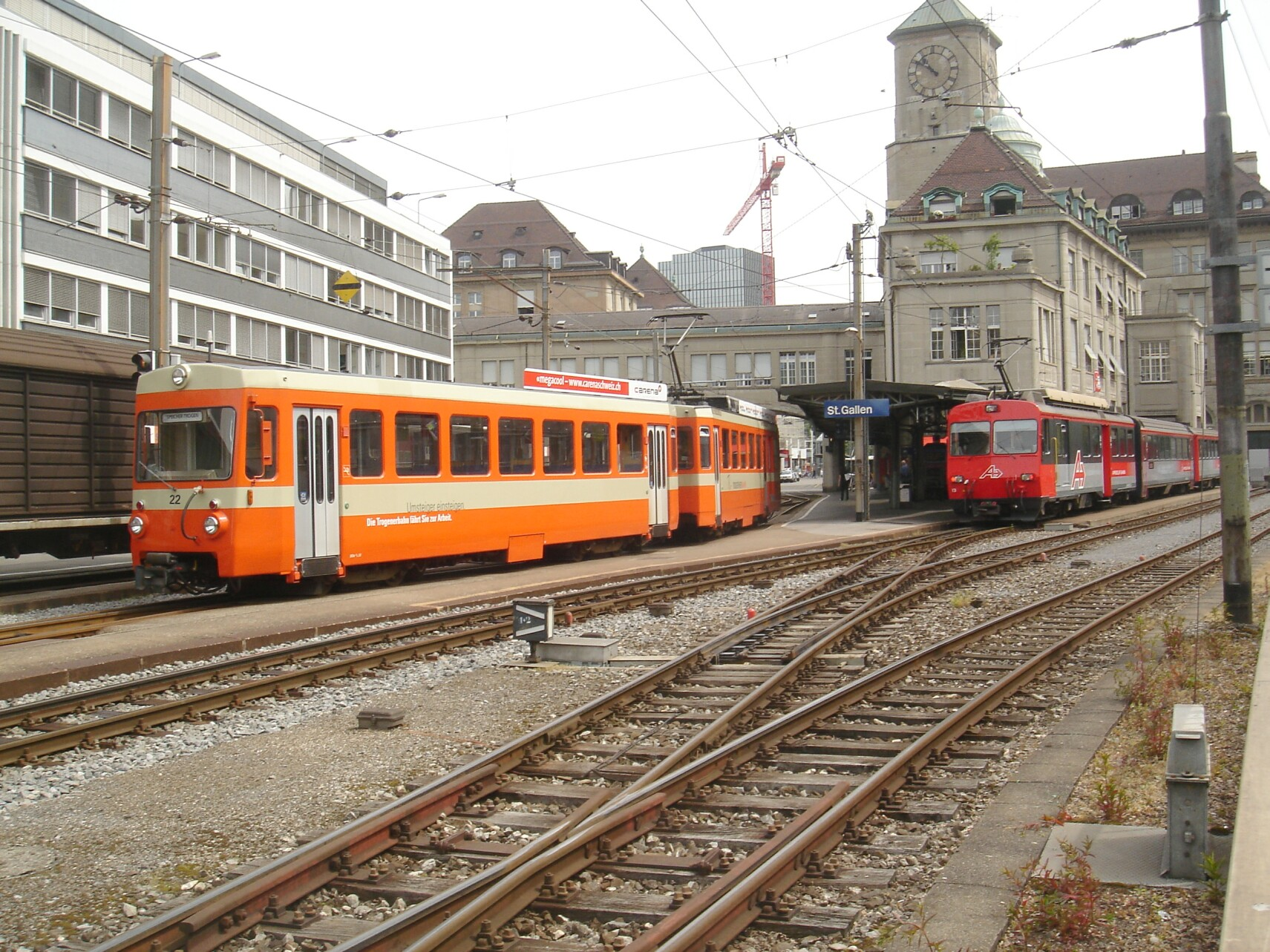
St. Gallen side station before the opening of the Ruckhalde Tunnel with a train to Trogen to the left of the entrance building and to Appenzell to the right of the entrance building.

The line passes through the stops of Teufen AR Stofel, Sternen bei Teufen, Niederteufen and Lustmühle before reaching the St. Gallen quarter of Riethüsli. Until 2018, train crossings took place at the Liebegg crossing loop 300 metres (984 ft 3 in) south of Riethüsli halt. Since 2018, the line has run through the Ruckhalde Tunnel on a decline of 8.0%, losing about 70 metres (229 ft 8 in) in altitude, to the level of the once important SBB freight yard in St. Gallen. The tunnel replaced the last remaining rack section, which had impressive view of the western parts of the city, and the sharp Ruckhalde curve. The tunnel also made an approximately 300 metres (984 ft 3 in)-long section of overhead line that had been shared with the St. Gallen Trolleybus superfluous. Due to the lower voltage of the trolleybus network, the two forms of transport were electrically isolated from each other. The section with an S-curve leading to St. Leonhard bridge will be replaced by a new double-track section next to the SBB St. Gallen–Winterthur railway by the end of 2021. After passing under the St. Leonhard bridge the line reaches the so-called St. Gallen Nebenbahnhof ("side station"), where a connecting building provides covered access to the standard-gauge trains of the SBB, its subsidiary Thurbo, and SOB.

The inner city section which has an overhead line voltage of only 600 volts instead of 1500 volts starts in the Nebenbahnhof and the cross-city line runs up to the Brühltor (Brühl gate) parallel to the St. Gallen Trolleybus line of the Verkehrsbetriebe der Stadt St. Gallen (lit. 'St. Gallen city transport company', VBSG). This section is supplied by a common traction substation. Originally, the trains to Trogen ran in the city on the tracks of the St. Gallen Tramway, which was closed in 1957, but this rail infrastructure now belongs to the Appenzell Railway. After taking over the tram infrastructure from the city of St. Gallen in 1959, the Trogen Railway was required to remove the second track in Bahnhofstrasse (between the station forecourt and the Schibener Gate — Schibenertor). The second track in Bahnhofstrasse was not restored until 1978.

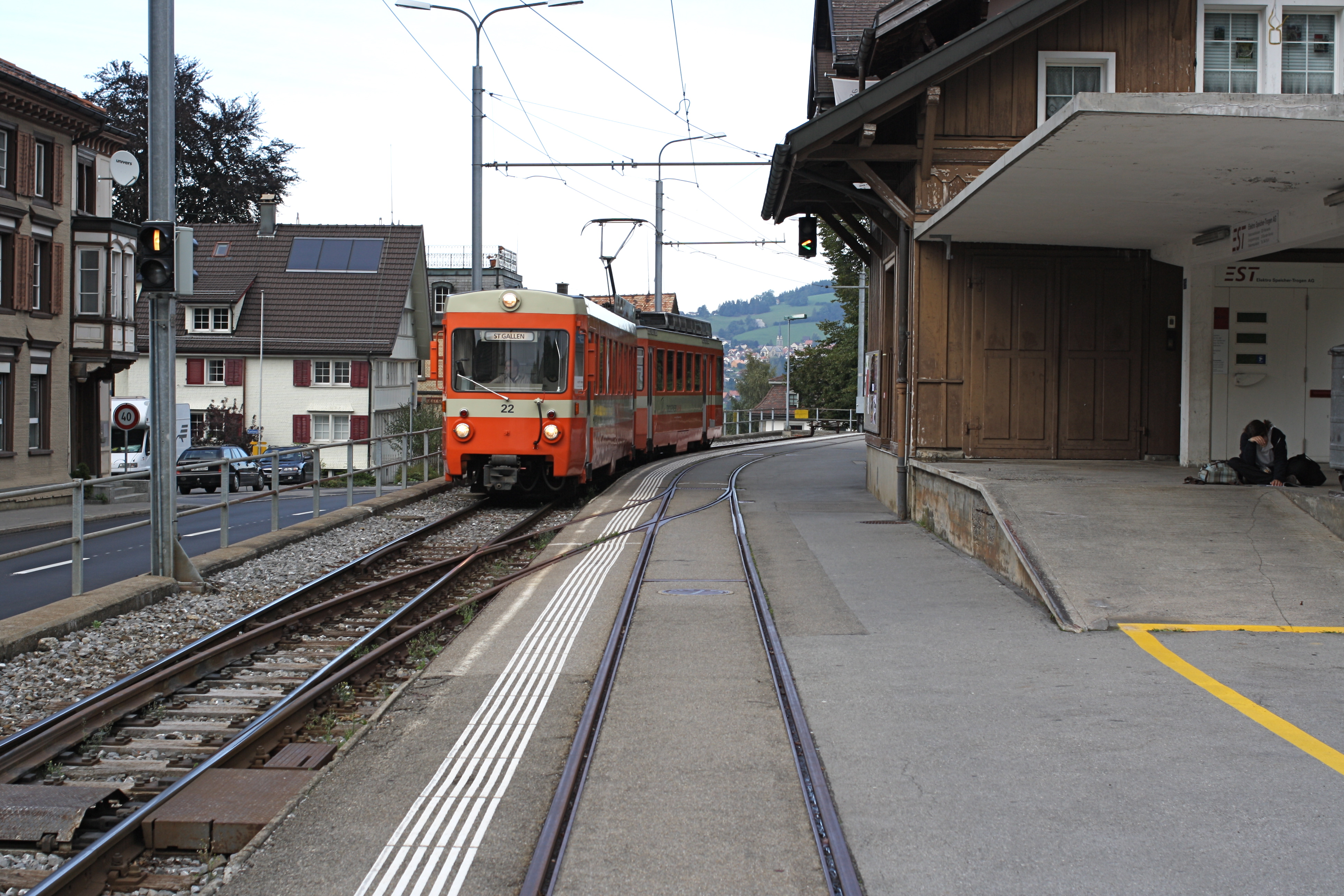
Trogen terminus with a BDe 4/8 22 set

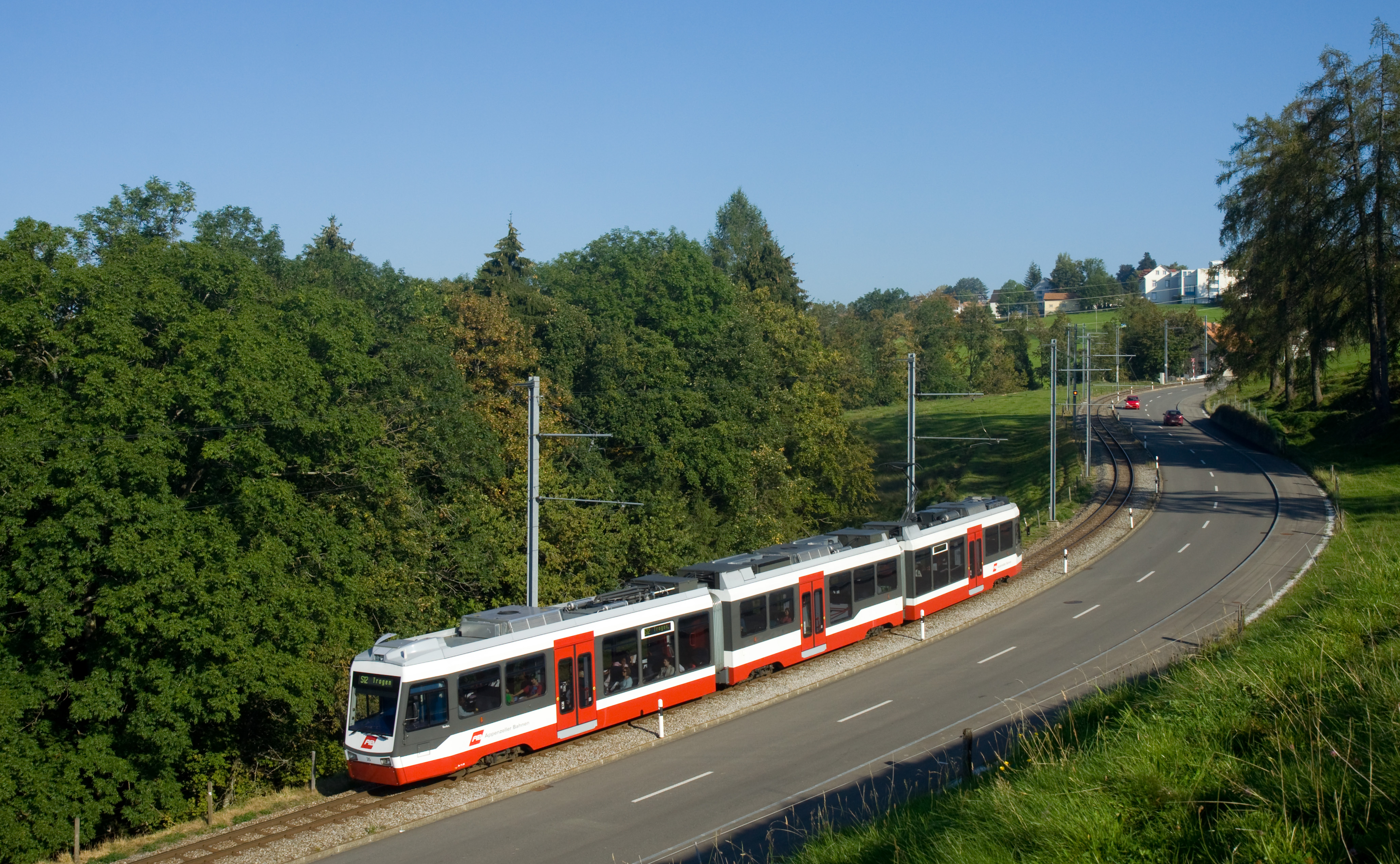
A Be 4/8 set on the slope between Rank and Vögelinsegg

The cross-city line is built as a tramway to the road junction beyond Brühl Gate. It runs up to Schülerhaus station on a double-lane track in the right-hand traffic and on grooved rails on the surface of the street. The light-rail vehicles are equipped with turning signals and with a bell, in addition to the normal train whistle.

Later, the line follows the St. Gallen–Speicher–Trogen cantonal road. From Schülerhaus, it has its own track with normal flat bottomed rail. In this section, the line has the character of an interurban, with trains passing on the left at the crossings loops, as in usual on Swiss railways, unlike trams. Originally, the track was consistently built on the road on this section. From 1953, the track was moved to its own route with assistance provided under the Privatbahnhilfegesetz (Private Railway Assistance Act), later the Eisenbahngesetz (Railway Act). The last part in the village of Speicher, including the station, was not moved from the road until 1997.

The steep section between Schülerhaus and Notkersegg offers a good view of the city of St. Gallen. Passengers can see the Wenigerweiher (a former millpond) at the Schwarzer Bären crossing loop and Lake Constance after the former halt of Rankv (until 2018). Shortly after the high point of the line at the monument to the Battle of Vögelinsegg (part of the Appenzell Wars) the line changes from the left to the right side of the road and reaches Schützengarten halt and then Speicher station, where the depot and workshop of the former Trogen Railway are located. After Bendlehn halt, the line and the cantonal road cross the Sägibach, a tributary of the Goldach River, and after passing through the halt of Gfeld, it reaches its terminus in Trogen, formerly the location of a cantonal assembly (Landsgemeinde).

== Operations ==
=== Until 2018 ===
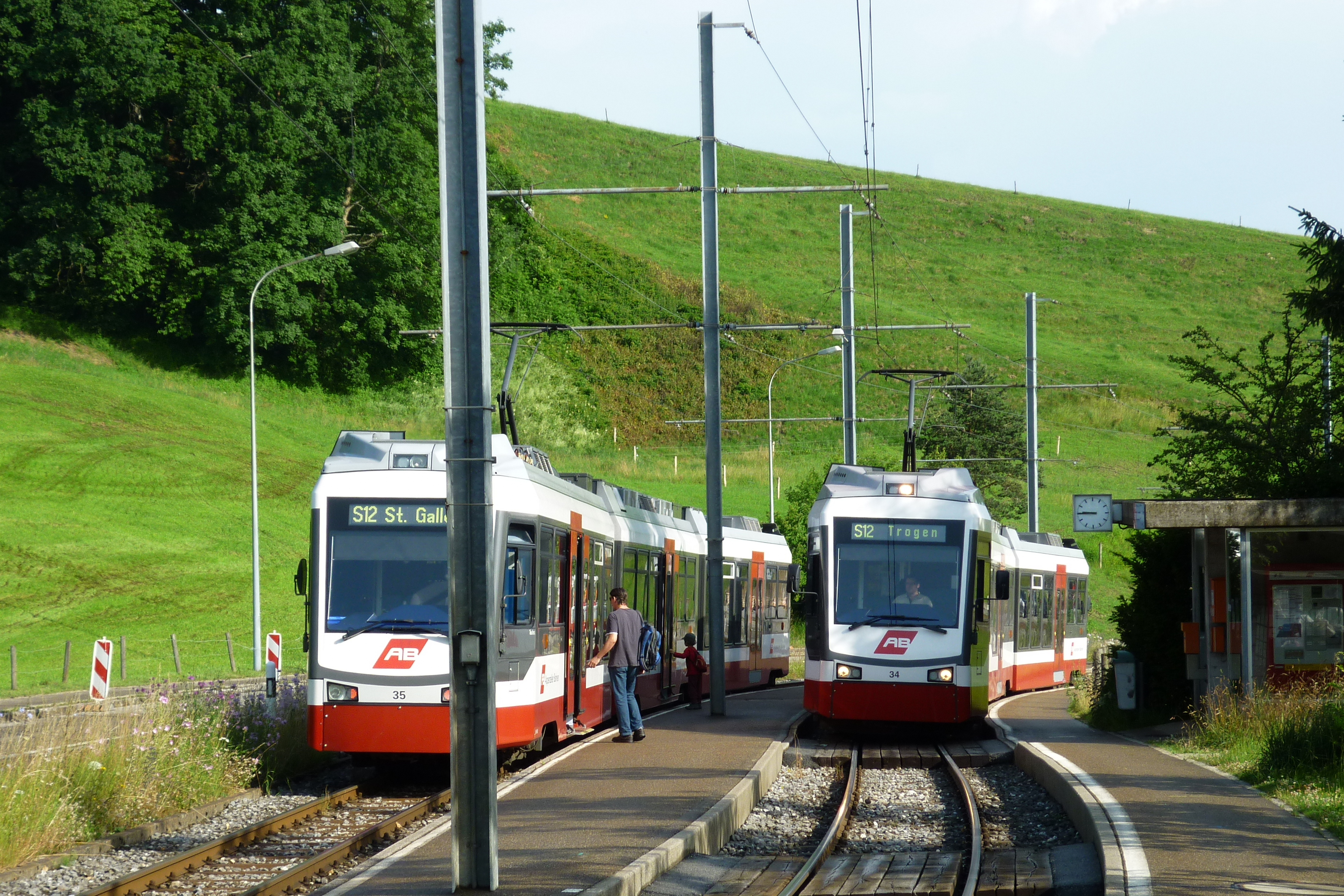
Be 4/8 sets crossing in Schwarzer Bären station (2012)

Before the opening of the Ruckhalde Tunnel, the St. Gallen–Appenzell line was operated as line S 22 of the St. Gallen S-Bahn. The trains ran every half hour and consisted of a BDeh 4/4 motor car, an intermediate car and a control car. Every second train had a low-floor control car. In the working day peak an express service ran from Appenzell to St. Gallen in the morning and returned in the evening peak, taking 39 minutes over the whole line rather than the usual 43 minutes. Two morning and several evening services were replaced by bus services.

The St. Gallen–Trogen line was operated as line S 21 during the day at half-hour intervals with four Be 4/8 services operated as two additional round trips during the peaks, creating a service every quarter of an hour. With the exception of Speicher, all intermediate stations are request stops. Scheduled train crossing occur in Schwarzer Bären station, but in the peak there are also crossings at Speicher and Spisertor. The Trogen line handled freight until mid-1991, largely with freight wagons attached to passenger trains, and until 2007, there were postal consignments in freight wagons.

=== Since the opening of the cross-city line ===
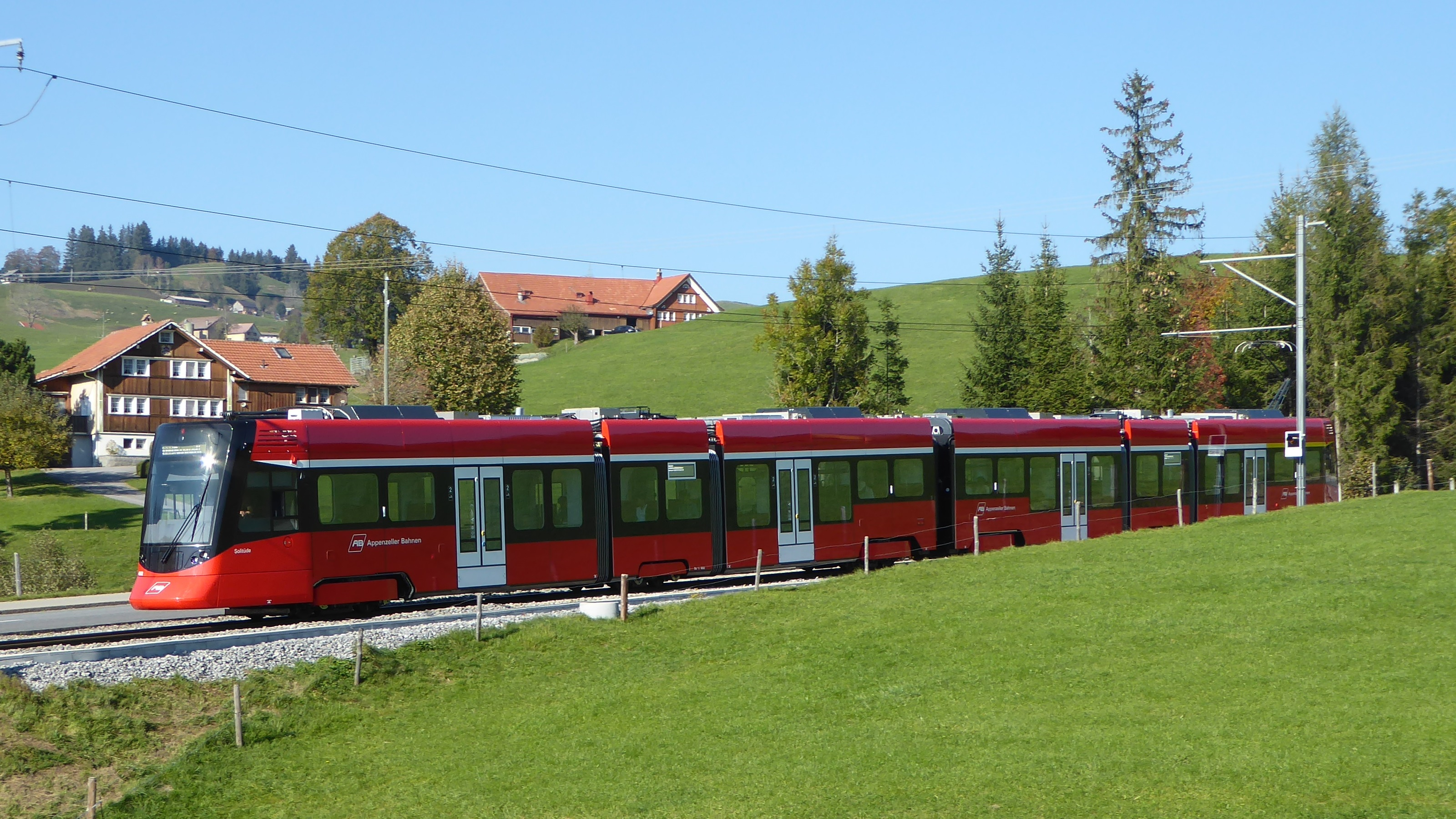
ABe 8/12 "Tango" set in 2018 between Sammelplatz and Hirschberg

In the 2019 timetable, the previous service is basically maintained with an additional Appenzell–St. Gallen express service operating in the load direction between Appenzell and St. Gallen in the peak. The regular interval regional services run on the Appenzell–Trogen route as line S 21 and on the Teufen–Trogen route as line S 22. The services previously operated in the evening by bus are provided by trains. The two minutes reduction in running time enabled by the Ruckhalde Tunnel required the extension of the Liebegg crossing loop to the Lustmühle halt. The other crossing loops on the Gais branch are located at St. Gallen freight yard, Niederteufen, Teufen and Gais.

Since the opening of the Ruckhalde Tunnel, all traffic has been handled by eleven 2.40 metre-wide Tango articulated railcar (class ABe 8/12), which is determined by the structure gauge of the Trogen Railway. The rolling stock previously used on the St. Gallen–Appenzell route are 25 centimetres wider. Major maintenance work will ensure that 2.65 metre-wide vehicles can be used for the next generation of rolling stock.

=== Projects ===
A new section of double track at the St. Gallen freight yard and a crossing loop at Eggli between Zweibrücken and Strahlholz will allow further travel time reductions between St. Gallen and Appenzell and improve the connections in Gais and Appenzell. The Gais workshop will be replaced by a new service center in Schwende, while only maintenance and minor repairs will be carried out in Speicher.
