= Bühler =

- Municipality
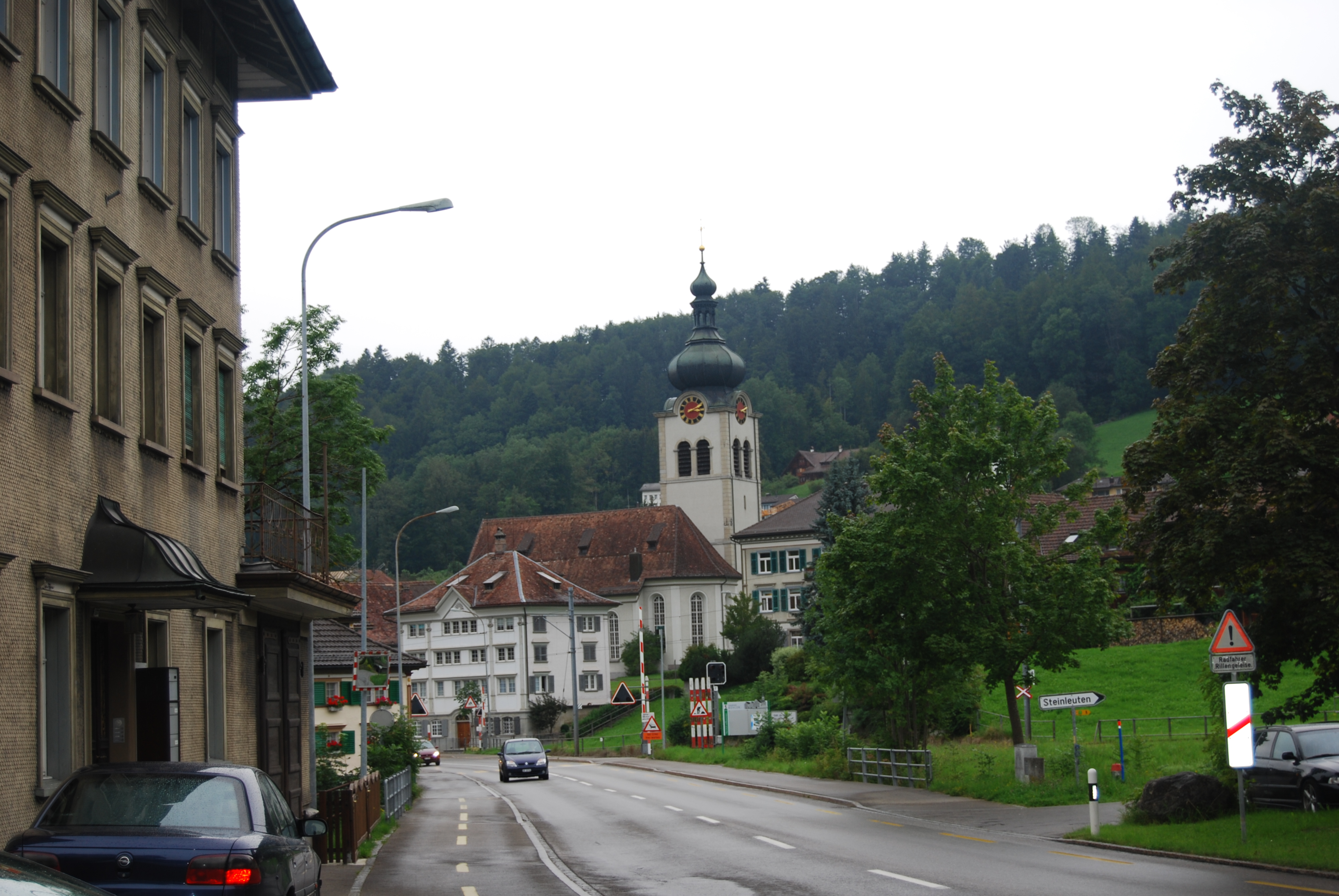

- Flag Coat of arms
- Location of Bühler
- Location within Switzerland Location within Canton of Appenzell Ausserrhoden
- Coordinates: 47°22′N 9°25′E
- Country: Switzerland
- Canton: Appenzell Ausserrhoden
- District: n.a.

Area
  - Total: 5.61 km^{2} (2.17 sq mi)
- Elevation: 828 m (2,717 ft)

Population (December 2008)
  - Total: 1,652
  - Density: 294/km^{2} (763/sq mi)
- Time zone: UTC+01:00 (CET)
  - Summer (DST): UTC+02:00 (CEST)
- Postal code: 9055
- SFOS number: 3021
- ISO 3166 code: CH-AR
- Surrounded by: Gais, Schlatt-Haslen (AI), Speicher, Teufen, Trogen
- Website: www.buehlerar.ch

Bühler (Swiss Standard German pronunciation: [ˈbyːlər]) is a municipality in the canton of Appenzell Ausserrhoden in Switzerland.

== History ==
Bühler is first mentioned in 1479 as Ullrich Büllershoff.

== Geography ==
Aerial view from 1200 m by Walter Mittelholzer (1919)

Bühler has an area, as of 2006, of 5.6 km^{2} (2.2 sq mi). Of this area, 62.7% is used for agricultural purposes, while 26% is forested. Of the rest of the land, 10.6% is settled (buildings or roads) and the remainder (0.7%) is non-productive (rivers, glaciers or mountains).

The municipality is located in the Appenzell Mittelland on the north side of the Rotbachtal. It consists of the village of Bühler and scattered hamlets and factories.

== Demographics ==
Bühler has a population (as of 2008) of 1,652, of which about 23.5% are foreign nationals. Over the last 10 years the population has decreased at a rate of -4.3%. Most of the population (as of 2000) speaks German (84.2%), with Italian being second most common ( 3.6%) and Serbo-Croat being third ( 2.7%).

As of 2000, the gender distribution of the population was 49.1% male and 50.9% female. The age distribution, as of 2000, in Bühler is; 155 people or 9.7% of the population are between 0–6 years old. 177 people or 11.1% are 6–15, and 65 people or 4.1% are 16–19. Of the adult population, 97 people or 6.1% of the population are between 20 and 24 years old. 450 people or 28.2% are 25–44, and 413 people or 25.8% are 45–64. The senior population distribution is 168 people or 10.5% of the population are between 65 and 79 years old, and 73 people or 4.6% are over 80.

In the 2007 federal election the FDP received 65.6% of the vote.

The entire Swiss population is generally well educated. In Bühler about 65.3% of the population (between age 25–64) have completed either non-mandatory upper secondary education or additional higher education (either university or a Fachhochschule).

Bühler has an unemployment rate of 1.19%. As of 2005, there were 61 people employed in the primary economic sector and about 24 businesses involved in this sector. 517 people are employed in the secondary sector and there are 32 businesses in this sector. 170 people are employed in the tertiary sector, with 45 businesses in this sector.

The historical population is given in the following table:

Historical population
Year	Pop.	±%
1734	1,167	—
1850	1,281	+9.8%
1880	1,611	+25.8%
1900	1,625	+0.9%
1950	1,222	−24.8%
1970	1,700	+39.1%
2000	1,598	−6.0%
2025		—

== Transport ==
Bühler is linked to the city of St. Gallen and Appenzell by the Appenzell–St. Gallen–Trogen railway, a narrow-gauge road-side railway line. The line operates two trains per hour throughout the day, with three trains per hour during peak periods. Services are operated by Appenzell Railways for S-Bahn St. Gallen. There are two stations within the municipality, Bühler and Steigbach. The journey from St. Gallen to Bühler takes 23 minutes.
