= Niederteufen railway station =

Train station in the canton of Appenzell Ausserrhoden, Switzerland

Niederteufen
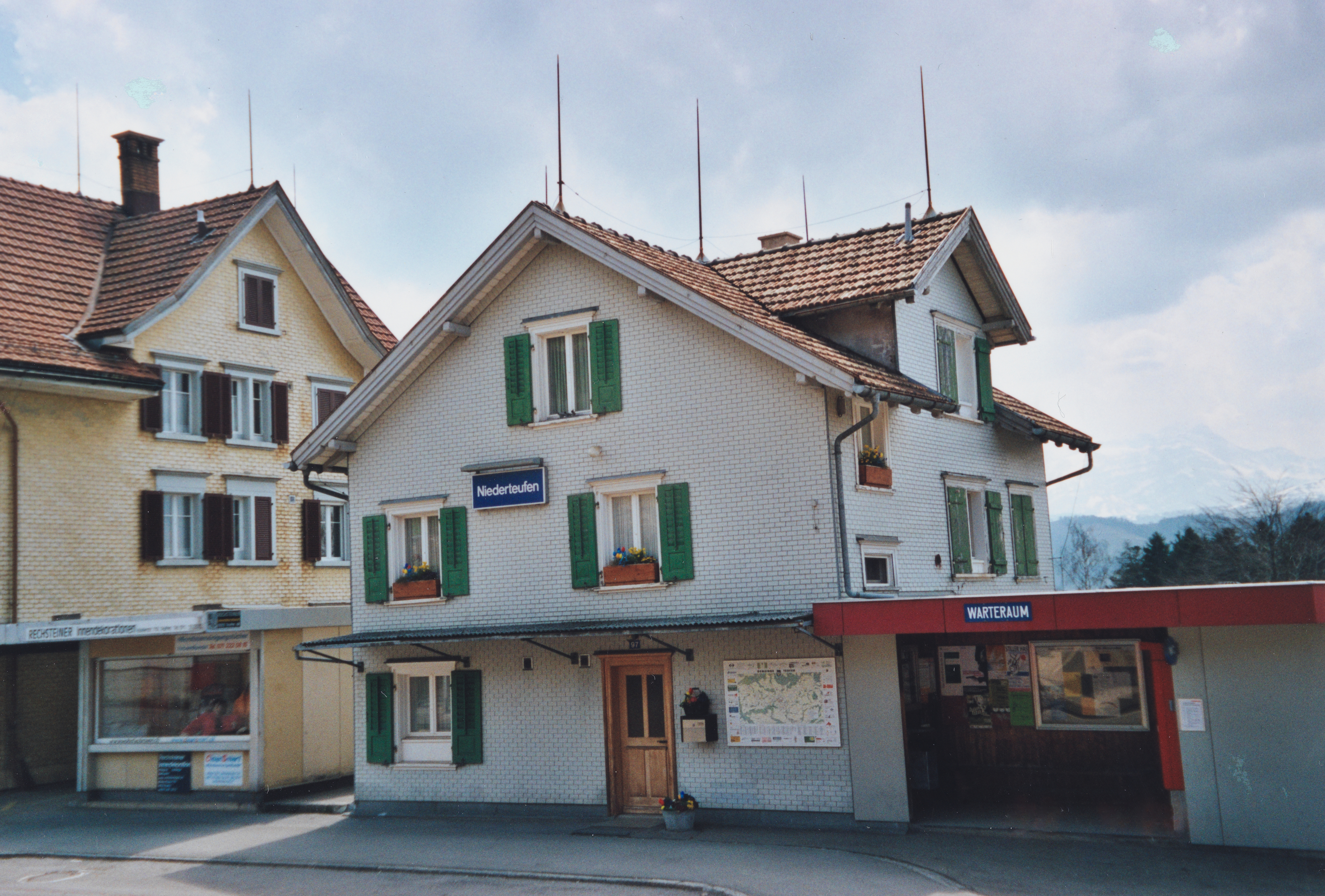
- The station in 2006

General information
- Location: Teufen; Canton of Appenzell Ausserrhoden, Switzerland
- Coordinates: 47°23′31″N 9°22′05″E
- Elevation: 834 m (2,736 ft)
- Lines: Appenzell–St. Gallen–Trogen railway; (St. Gallen-Gais-Appenzell railway until 2018)
- Platforms: 2 side platforms
- Tracks: 2
- Train operators: Appenzell Railways
- Connections
- Bus: PostAuto bus route 181

Other information
- Fare zone: 211 (Tarifverbund Ostwind)

Services
Preceding station	St. Gallen S-Bahn	Following station
Teufen AR towards Appenzell	S20	St. Gallen towards Trogen
Sternen bei Teufen towards Appenzell	S21	Lustmühle towards Trogen
Sternen bei Teufen towards Teufen AR	S22	Lustmühle towards Trogen
Location
- Location within Switzerland Location within Canton of Appenzell Ausserrhoden

Niederteufen station is a railway station in the Ortschaft of Niederteufen in the municipality of Teufen, in the canton of Appenzell Ausserrhoden, Switzerland. It is located along Hauptstrasse on the 1,000 mm (3 ft 3 3/8 in) Appenzell–St. Gallen–Trogen line of Appenzell Railways (Appenzeller Bahnen, AB), and is served by local light rail trains only.

== Services ==
Only S-Bahn services call at Niederteufen (stop only on request). As of the December 2024 timetable change, the station is served by the following services:

- St. Gallen S-Bahn:
  - S20: hourly service to Appenzell via St. Gallen (peak-hour service, only calls at Niederteufen, Teufen AR and Bühler between St. Gallen and Gais).
  - S21: half-hourly service between Appenzell and Trogen, via St. Gallen.
  - S22: rush-hour service between Teufen AR and Trogen, via St. Gallen.

== See also ==
- Rail transport in Switzerland
