= Bühler railway station =

Train station in Switzerland

Bühler
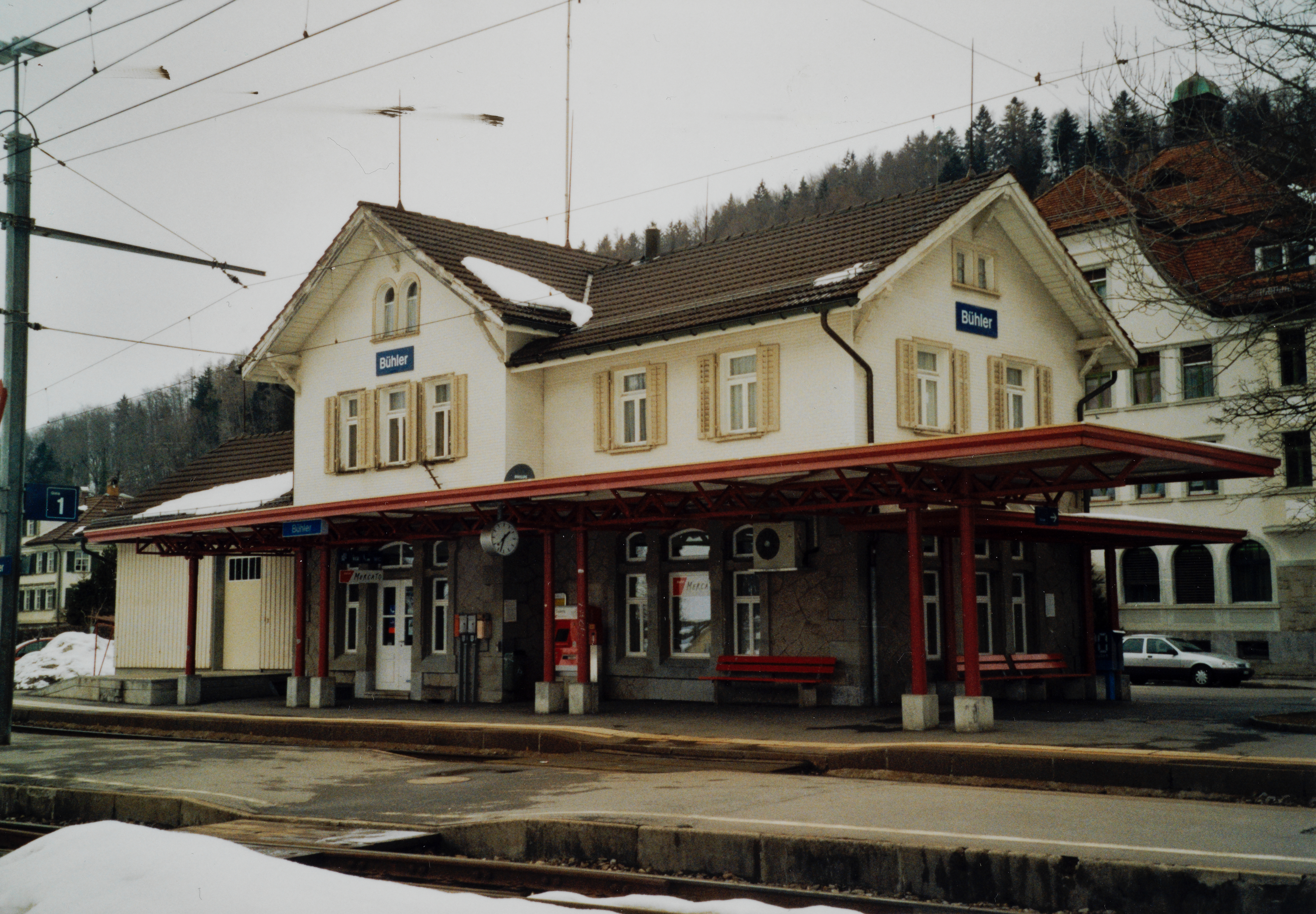
- The station building and platform in 2009

General information
- Location: Bühler, Appenzell Ausserrhoden; Switzerland
- Coordinates: 47°22′23″N 9°25′16″E
- Elevation: 828 m (2,717 ft)
- Owner: Appenzell Railways
- Lines: Appenzell–St. Gallen–Trogen railway; (St. Gallen-Gais-Appenzell railway until 2018)
- Platforms: 1 island platform
- Tracks: 2

Other information
- Fare zone: 245 (Tarifverbund Ostwind)

Services
Preceding station	St. Gallen S-Bahn	Following station
Gais towards Appenzell	S20	Teufen AR towards Trogen
Strahlholz towards Appenzell	S21	Steigbach towards Trogen
Location
- Location within Switzerland Location within Canton of Appenzell Ausserrhoden

Bühler railway station (German: Bahnhof Bühler) is a railway station in the municipality of Bühler, in the Swiss canton of Appenzell Ausserrhoden. It is located on the 1,000 mm (3 ft 3+^{3}/_{8} in) metre gauge Appenzell–St. Gallen–Trogen line of Appenzell Railways, and is served by local trains only.

== History ==
A railway was demanded by Bühler industrialists and plans were made in the 1870s to extend the railway through Bühler to St Gallen. However, the station needed to be located above the village to maintain a regular gradient of the line. This proved impractical for local industry so the project was abandoned in 1877.

With improvements to railway technology, the project was revived in 1882 and the station was completed in 1889. The station was renovated in 2021. As part of the renovation process, Appenzell Railways planned a demolition of the original station building, which was scheduled for 2024.

== Services ==
As of the December 2023 timetable change, the following services stop at Bühler:

- St. Gallen S-Bahn:
  - S20: hourly service between Trogen and Appenzell, via St. Gallen (peak-hour service, only calls at Niederteufen, Teufen AR and Bühler between Gais and St. Gallen).
  - S21: half-hourly service between Trogen and Appenzell, via St. Gallen.

== See also ==
- Rail transport in Switzerland
