= Teufen AR railway station =

Train station in Switzerland

Teufen AR
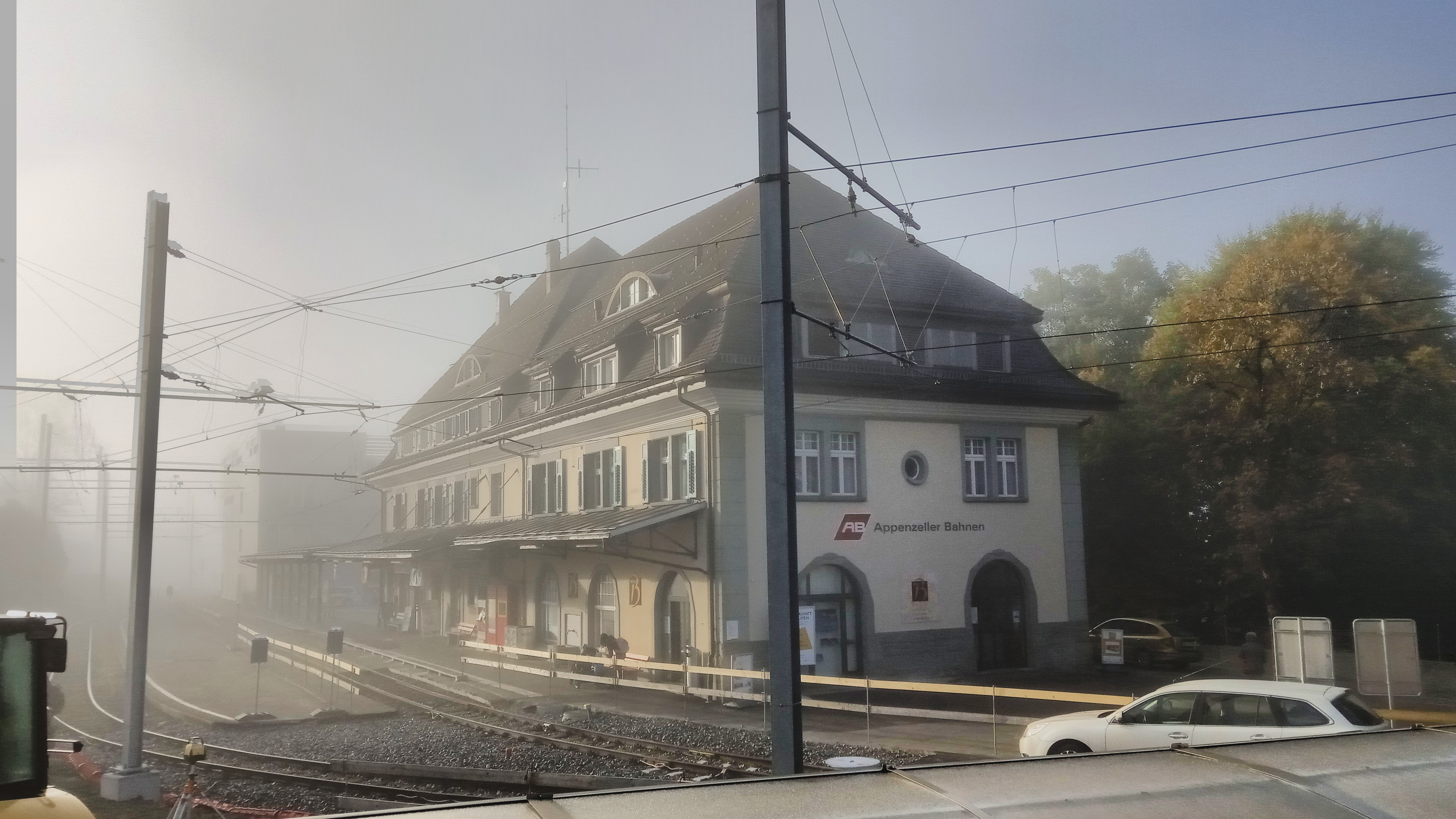
- The station building in 2018

General information
- Other names: German: Bahnhof Teufen
- Location: Switzerland
- Coordinates: 47°23′N 9°23′E
- Elevation: 837 m (2,746 ft)
- Owner: Appenzell Railways
- Line: Appenzell–St. Gallen–Trogen railway
- Platforms: 1 side platform; 1 island platform
- Tracks: 3
- Train operators: Appenzell Railways
- Connections
- Bus: PostAuto bus routes 181 190 191

Other information
- Fare zone: 211 (Tarifverbund Ostwind)

Services
Preceding station	St. Gallen S-Bahn	Following station
Bühler towards Appenzell	S20	Niederteufen towards Trogen
Steigbach towards Appenzell	S21	Teufen AR Stofel towards Trogen
Terminus	S22	Teufen AR Stofel towards Trogen
Location
- Location within Switzerland Location within Canton of Appenzell Ausserrhoden

The Teufen AR railway station (German: Bahnhof Teufen) is a railway station in the municipality of Teufen, in the Swiss canton of Appenzell Ausserrhoden. It is located on the 1,000 mm (3 ft 3+^{3}/_{8} in) metre gauge Appenzell–St. Gallen–Trogen line of Appenzell Railways, and is served by local trains only. The AR stands for Appenzell Ausserrhoden, to distinguish the station from Freienstein-Teufen in Canton Zurich.

== Services ==
As of the December 2023 timetable change, the following services stop at Teufen AR:

- St. Gallen S-Bahn:
  - S20: rush-hour service between Trogen and Appenzell, via St. Gallen (only calls at Niederteufen, Teufen AR and Bühler between Gais and St. Gallen).
  - S21: half-hourly service between Appenzell and Trogen, via St. Gallen.
  - S22: rush-hour service to Trogen via St. Gallen.

== See also ==
- Rail transport in Switzerland
