= Trogen railway station =

Train station in Trogen, Switzerland

Trogen
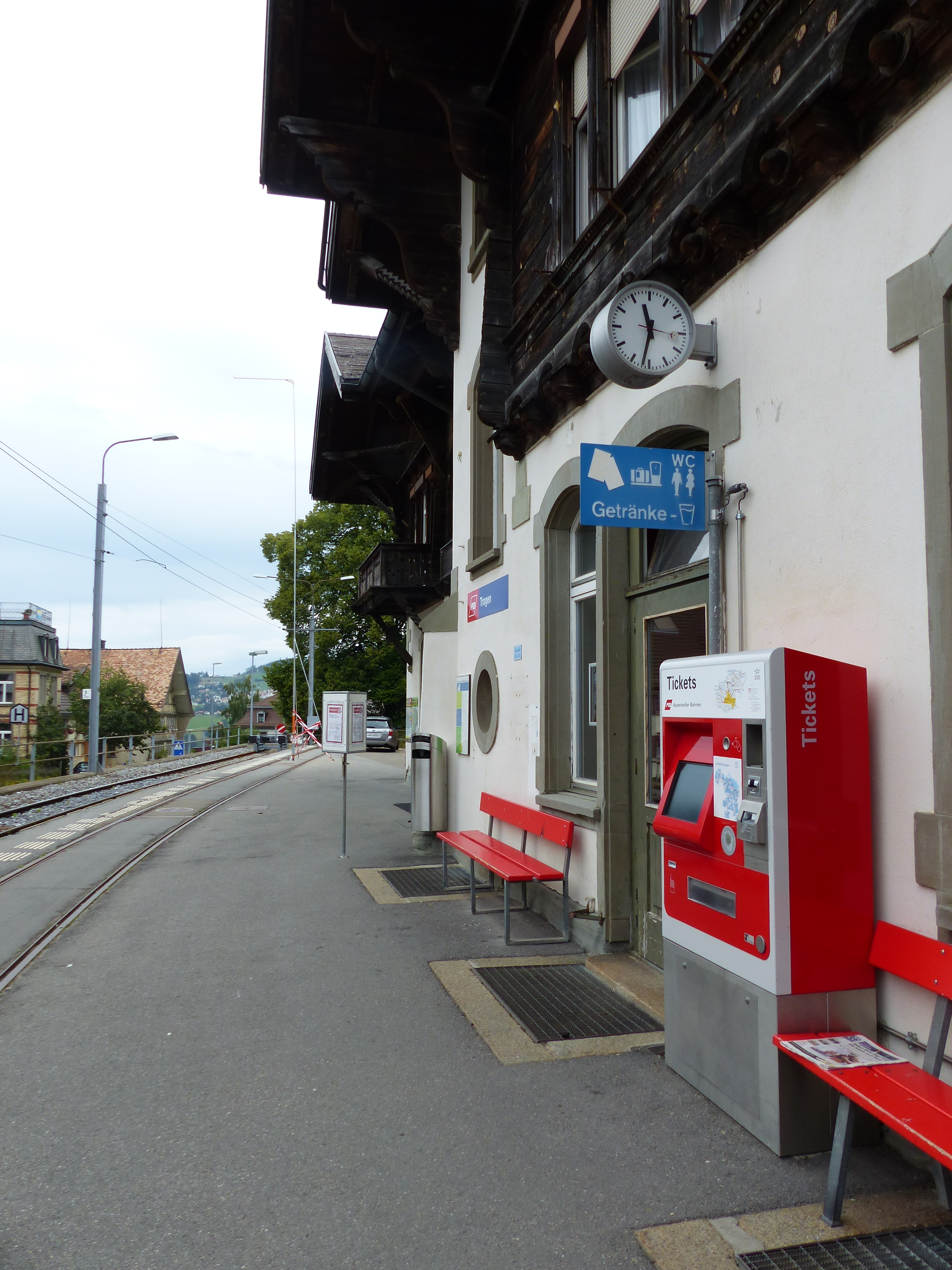
- The station building in 2019

General information
- Location: Switzerland
- Coordinates: 47°24′25″N 9°27′40″E
- Elevation: 919 m (3,015 ft)
- Owner: Appenzell Railways
- Lines: St. Gallen–Trogen railway Appenzell–St. Gallen–Trogen railway
- Train operators: Appenzell Railways
- Connections
- Bus: PostAuto bus routes 181 229 230

Other information
- Fare zone: 245 (Tarifverbund Ostwind)

Services
Preceding station	St. Gallen S-Bahn	Following station
Gfeld towards Appenzell	S20	Terminus
Gfeld towards Appenzell	S21	Terminus
Gfeld towards Teufen AR	S22	Terminus
Location
- Location within Switzerland Location within Canton of Appenzell Ausserrhoden

Trogen railway station (German: Bahnhof Trogen) is a railway station in Trogen, in the Swiss canton of Appenzell Ausserrhoden. It is the terminus of the 1,000 mm (3 ft 3+^{3}/_{8} in) metre gauge St. Gallen–Trogen railway line (since 2018 Appenzell–St. Gallen–Trogen railway line) of Appenzell Railways.

== Services ==
As of the December 2023 timetable change, the following services stop at Trogen:

- St. Gallen S-Bahn:
  - S20: hourly service to Appenzell via St. Gallen (peak-hour service, only calls at Niederteufen, Teufen AR and Bühler between St. Gallen and Gais).
  - S21: half-hourly service to Appenzell via St. Gallen.
  - S22: hourly service to Teufen AR via St. Gallen (peak-hour only).
