= Appenzell railway station =

Train station in Switzerland

Appenzell
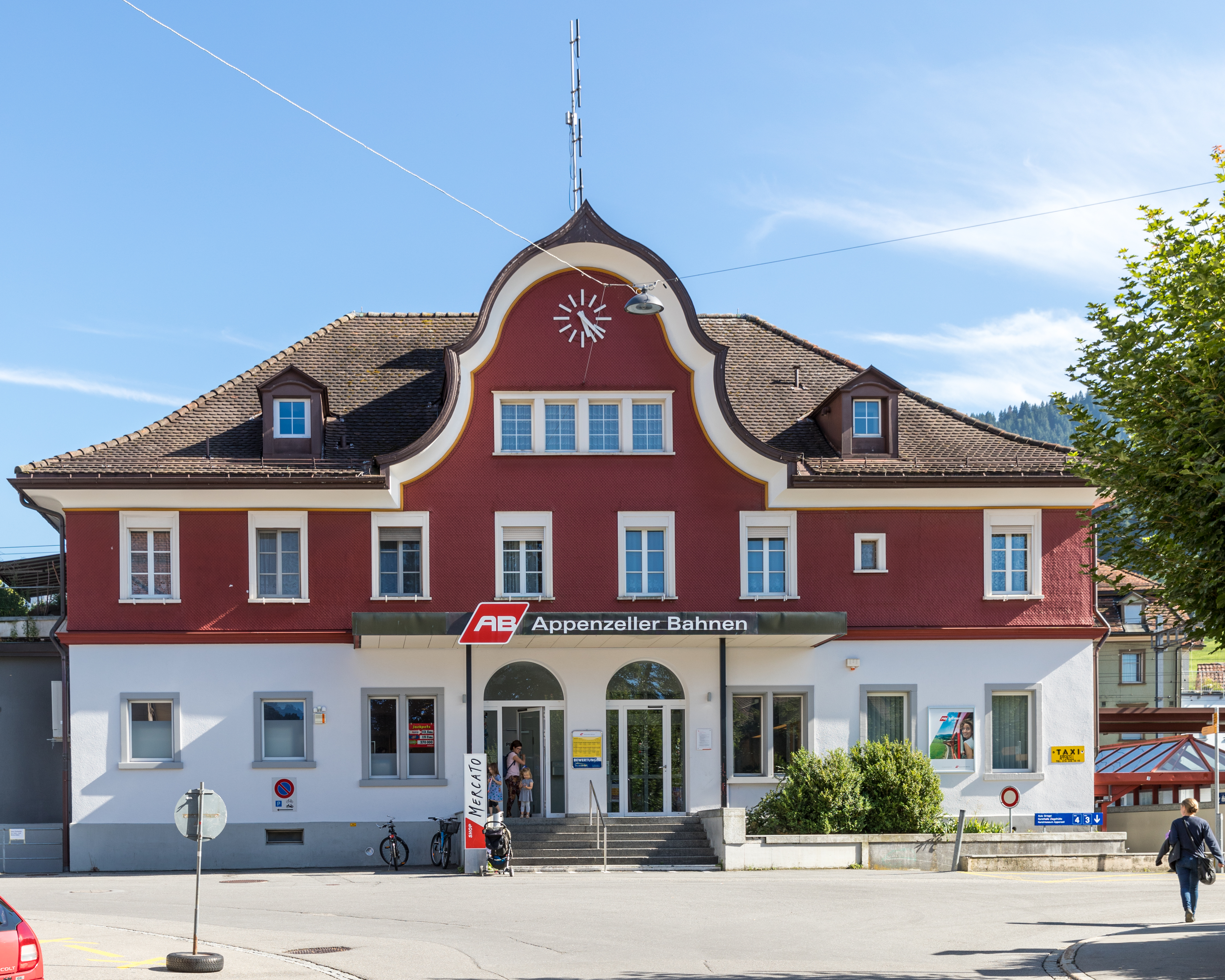
- The station building in 2017

General information
- Location: Appenzell, Appenzell Innerrhoden; Switzerland
- Coordinates: 47°19′43″N 9°24′34″E
- Elevation: 786 m (2,579 ft)
- Owner: Appenzell Railways
- Lines: Appenzell–St. Gallen–Trogen line; Gossau–Wasserauen line
- Distance: 20.1 km (12.5 mi) from St. Gallen; 25.9 km (16.1 mi) from Gossau SG
- Platforms: 2 island platforms; 1 side platform
- Tracks: 4
- Train operators: Appenzell Railways
- Connections
- Bus: PostAuto bus route 191

Other information
- Fare zone: 247 (Tarifverbund Ostwind)

Services
Preceding station	St. Gallen S-Bahn	Following station
Terminus	S20	Hirschberg towards Trogen
Terminus	S21	Hirschberg towards Trogen
Gontenbad towards Gossau SG	S23	Steinegg towards Wasserauen
Location
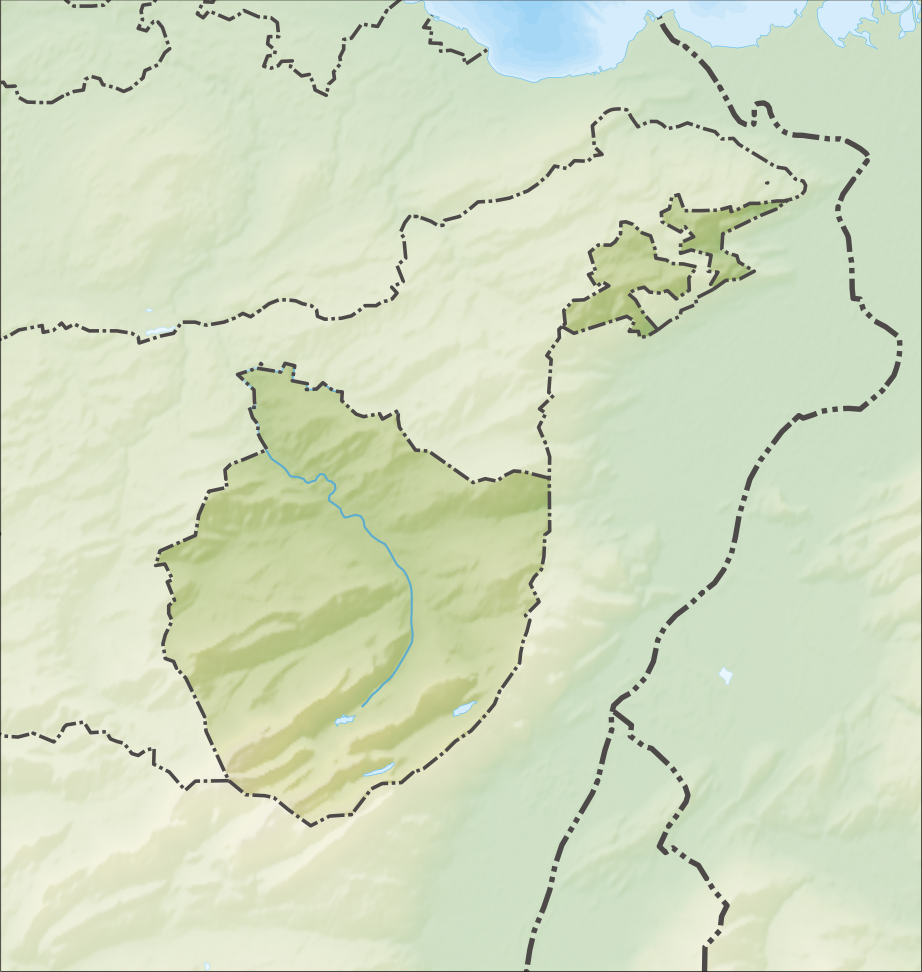
- Location within Switzerland Location within Canton of Appenzell Innerrhoden

Appenzell railway station (German: Bahnhof Appenzell) is a railway station in the district of Appenzell, in the Swiss canton of Appenzell Innerrhoden. It is located at the junction of the 1,000 mm (3 ft 3 3/8 in) metre gauge Appenzell–St. Gallen–Trogen and Gossau–Wasserauen lines of Appenzell Railways.

== Services ==
As of the December 2020 timetable change, the following services stop at Appenzell:

- St. Gallen S-Bahn:
  - S20: rush-hour service to Trogen via Gais and St. Gallen (only calls at Bühler, Teufen AR and Niederteufen between Gais and St. Gallen).
  - S21: half-hourly service to Trogen via Gais and St. Gallen.
  - S23: half-hourly service between Gossau SG and Wasserauen, via Herisau.

== See also ==
- Rail transport in Switzerland
