= Municipal executive in Switzerland =

Executive power

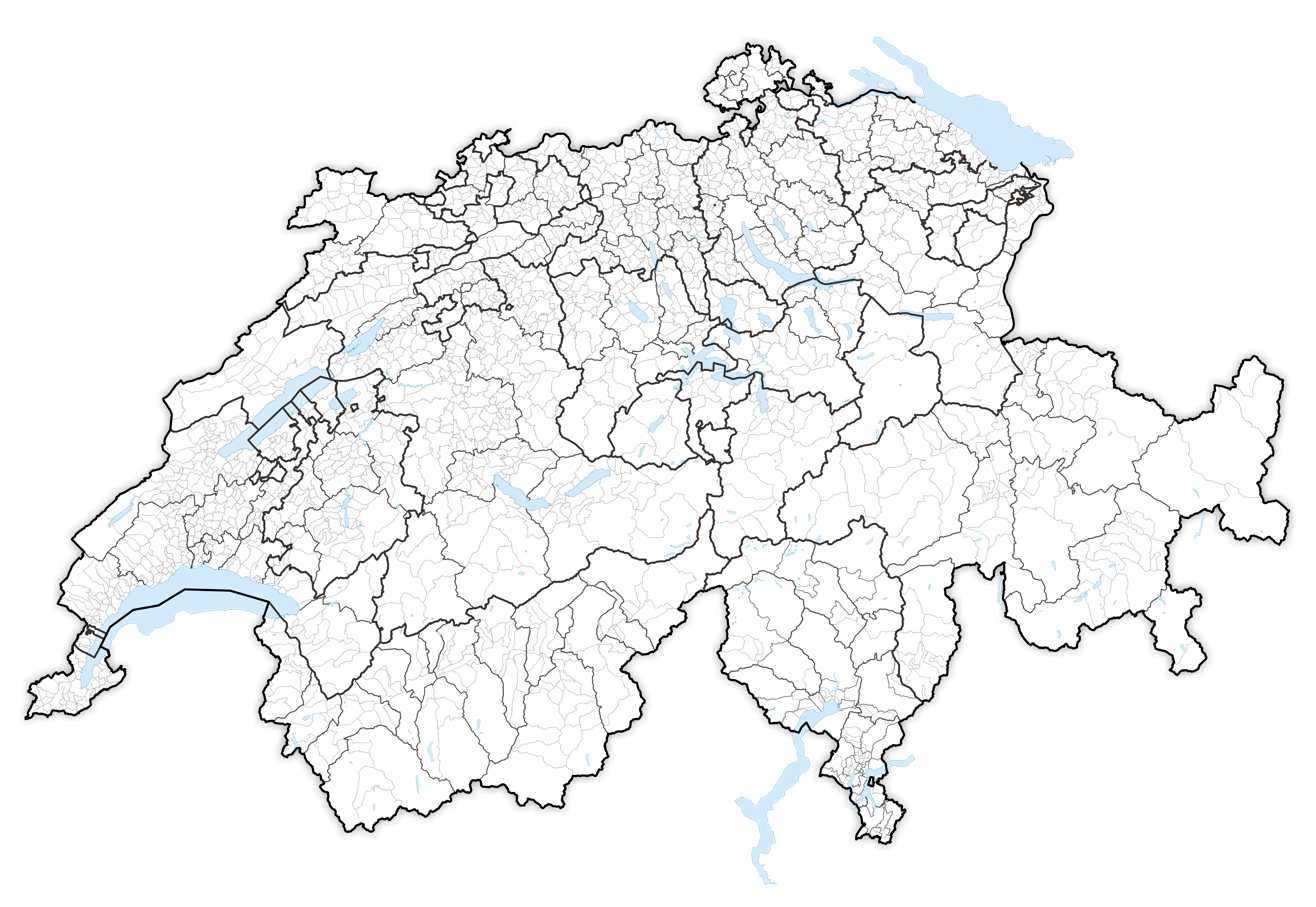
Map of Swiss municipalities as of January 1, 2026.

In Switzerland, executive authority at the municipal level is exercised by an elected body. Its designation, composition, method of election, term of office, and powers vary by canton and, in some cases, between municipalities within the same canton.

The executive body is generally headed by a president, whose title varies according to local usage, such as president of the municipality, mayor, or syndic.

== Overview ==
Comparison of Municipal Executives by Canton
Canton	Number of municipalities	Name	Number of members	Term of office	Legal basis
Zurich	162 municipalities	Gemeindevorstand (Note: The designation may vary if the basic municipal regulations stipulate otherwise.)	min. 5 members	according to municipal law	Gemeindegesetz (GG/ZH)
Berne	342 municipalities	Municipal Council / Gemeinderat (in practice also Conseil municipal)	min. 3 members	generally 4 years	Law on Municipalities (LCo/BE)
Lucerne	82 municipalities	Gemeinderat (also Gemeinderat for cities)	min. 3 members	4 years	Gemeindegesetz (GG/LU)
Uri	20 municipalities	Gemeinderat	min. 5 members (including the president)	according to municipal law	Gemeindegesetz (GEG/UR)
Schwyz	30 municipalities	Gemeinderat	3 to 9 members (including president and Säckelmeister)	4 years (president and Säckelmeister: 2 years)	Gemeindeorganisationsgesetz (GO/SZ)
Obwalden	7 municipalities	Gemeinderat or Einwohnergemeinderat	5 or 7 members	4 years	Cantonal Constitution (Cst./SZ)
Nidwalden	11 municipalities	Administrativer Rat (according to cantonal law), Gemeinderat (in practice)	3 to 11 members (according to cantonal law), 5 or 7 members (in practice)	4 years	Gemeindegesetz (GemG/NW) Behördengesetz (BehG/NW)
Glarus	3 municipalities	Vorsteherschaft (according to cantonal law), Gemeinderat (in practice)	min. 4 members and a president (according to cantonal law), 7 members (in practice)	according to municipal law, 4 years in practice	Gemeindegesetz (GG/GL)
Zug	11 municipalities	Gemeinderat (according to cantonal law), Stadtrat (for Zug)	5 or 7 members (according to cantonal law), 7 members (only for Baar)	4 years	Gemeindegesetz (GG/ZG)
Fribourg	133 municipalities	Municipal Council / Gemeinderat	5 to 9 members	4 years	Law on Municipalities (LCo/EN)
Solothurn	109 municipalities	according to municipal law	min. 3 members	according to municipal law	Gemeindegesetz (GG/SO)
Basel-Stadt (Note: The cantonal authorities of Basel-Stadt administer the municipality of Basel (GG/BS 1984, § 18).)	3 municipalities	Basel: Regierungsrat (cantonal government); Riehen and Bettingen: Gemeinderat (according to cantonal law)	according to cantonal and municipal law (Basel and Riehen: 7 members; Bettingen: 5 members)	according to cantonal and municipal law (4 years in practice)	Gemeindegesetz (GG/BS)
Basel-Landschaft	86 municipalities	Gemeinderat (according to cantonal law), Stadtrat (in Liestal)	min. 3 members	4 years	Gemeindegesetz (GOG/BL)
Schaffhausen	26 municipalities	Gemeinderat (according to cantonal law), Stadtrat (in Schaffhausen and Stein am Rhein)	3 to 7 members, 5 members (in practice)	4 years (in practice)	Gemeindegesetz (GG/SH)
Appenzell Innerrhoden	6 municipalities	Bezirksrat	min. 5 members (in practice 5 members)	1 year or 4 years (in practice)	Cantonal Constitution (Cst./AI)
Appenzell Ausserrhoden	20 municipalities	Gemeinderat	min. 5 members (in practice 5 to 9 members)	4 years	Gemeindegesetz (GG/AR)
St. Gallen	113 municipalities	Gemeinderat or Stadtrat	min. 3 members	4 years	Gemeindegesetz (GG/SG)
Grisons	105 municipalities	Gemeindevorstand, Kleiner Stadtrat (for Chur), Giunta comunale, Suprastanza da la vischnanca	min. 3 members	4 years	Gemeindegesetz (GG/GR)
Aargau	210 municipalities	Gemeindevorstand	5 to 7 members (including Gemeindeammann and Vizeammann)	4 years	Gemeindegesetz (GG/AG)
Thurgau	80 municipalities	Gemeindevorstand	min. 3 members	according to municipal law	Gemeindegesetz (GemG/TG)
Ticino	112 municipalities	Municipio	3 to 7 members	4 years	Municipal Organic Law (LOC/TI)
Vaud	309 municipalities	Municipalité	3 to 9 members	5 years	Law on Municipalities (LC/VD)
Valais	112 municipalities	Municipal Council, Municipal Council (in large cities), Gemeinderat	3 to 15 members	4 years	Law on Municipalities (LCo/VS)
Neuchâtel	24 municipalities	Municipal Council	according to municipal law	4 years	Law on Municipalities (LCo/NE)
Geneva	45 municipalities	Administrative Council; Mayor and two deputies (in small towns)	3 or 5 depending on municipal population (by decree of the Conseil d'État)	5 years	Cantonal Constitution (Cst./GE) and Law on Municipal Administration (LAC/GE)
Jura	53 municipalities	Municipal Council	min. 3 or 5 members	5 years	Law on Municipalities (LCom/JU)

Caption:

determined by municipal law
combination of municipal and cantonal law (general framework set by the canton, implementation by the municipality)
determined by cantonal law (default case), modifiable by municipal law (implementation of an exception)
strictly determined by cantonal law (no derogation by municipal law)

== Situation by canton ==
=== Zurich ===
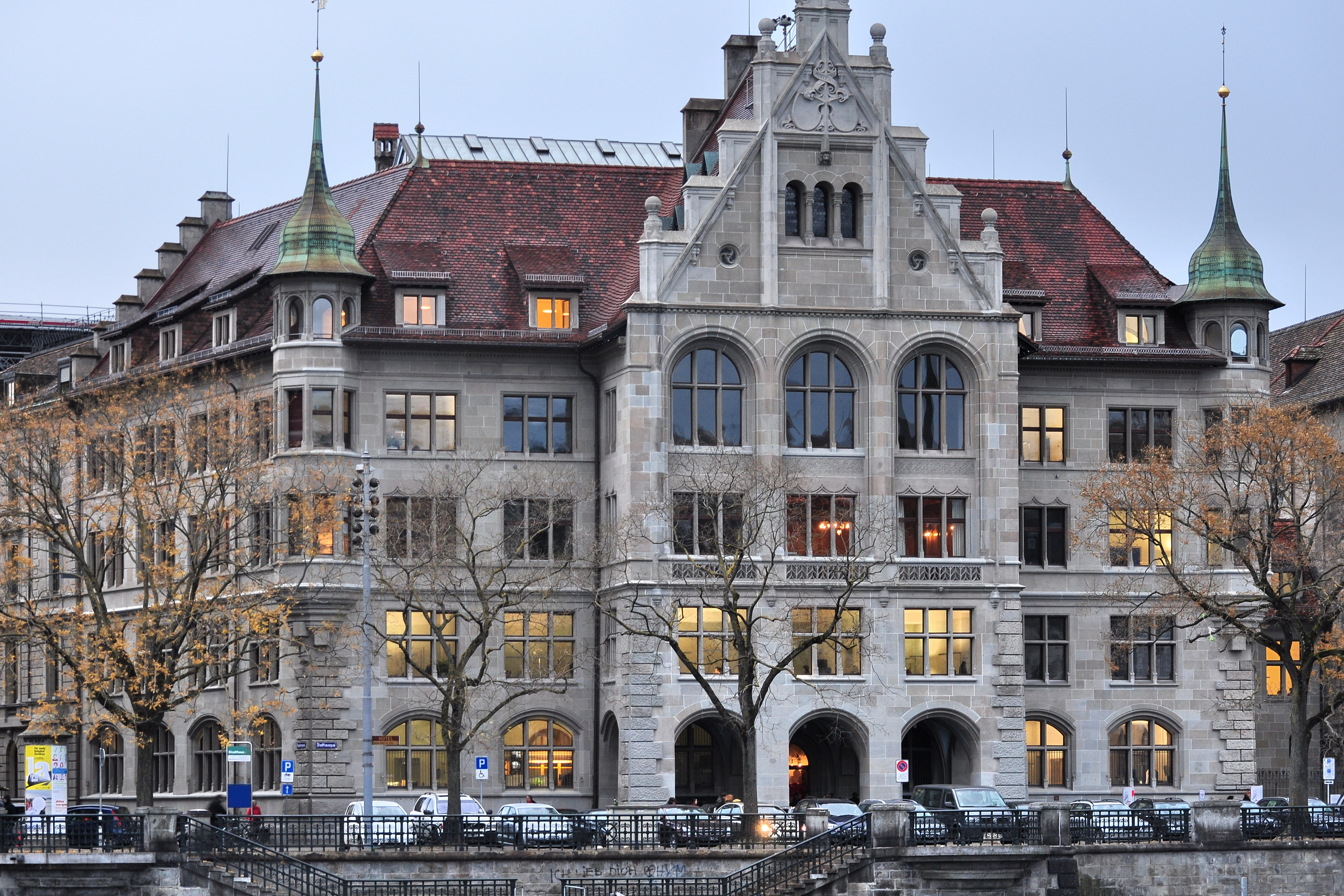
The Stadthaus in Zurich, seat of the Zurich City Council.

The canton of Zurich is divided into 162 municipalities. Under cantonal law, municipal executive authority is exercised by a body known as the Gemeindevorstand (municipal committee). Municipalities may assign it a different name in their Gemeindeordnung (municipal regulations), commonly Gemeinderat in municipalities with a municipal assembly and Stadtrat in those with a municipal parliament, such as the city of Zurich.

The Gemeindevorstand consists of at least five members, with the exact number determined by each municipality’s regulations. It is the highest municipal authority, represents the municipality externally, and appoints the Gemeindeschreiber (municipal secretary).

=== Bern ===
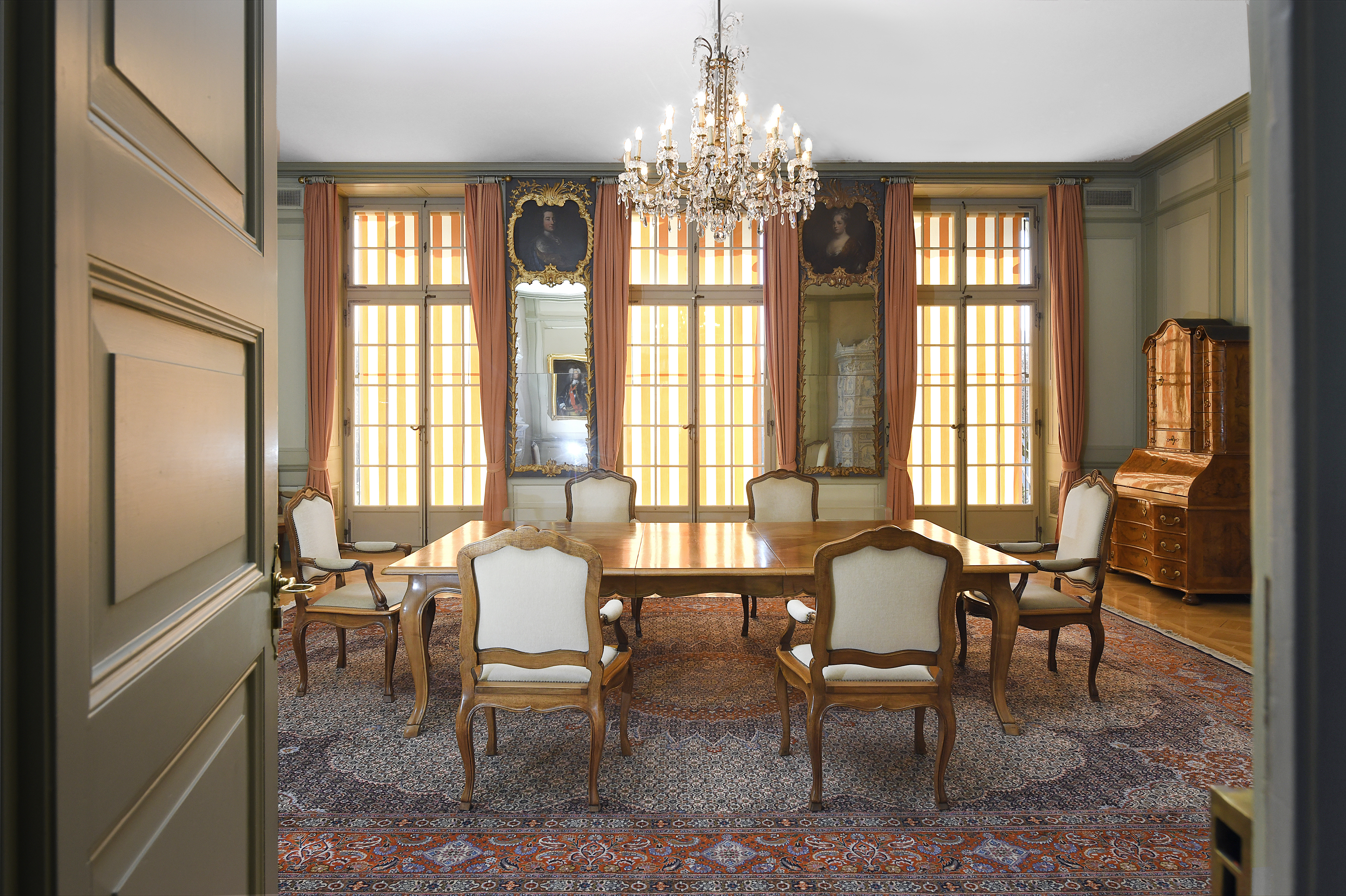
Bern City Council Chamber, in the Erlacherhof, Bern.

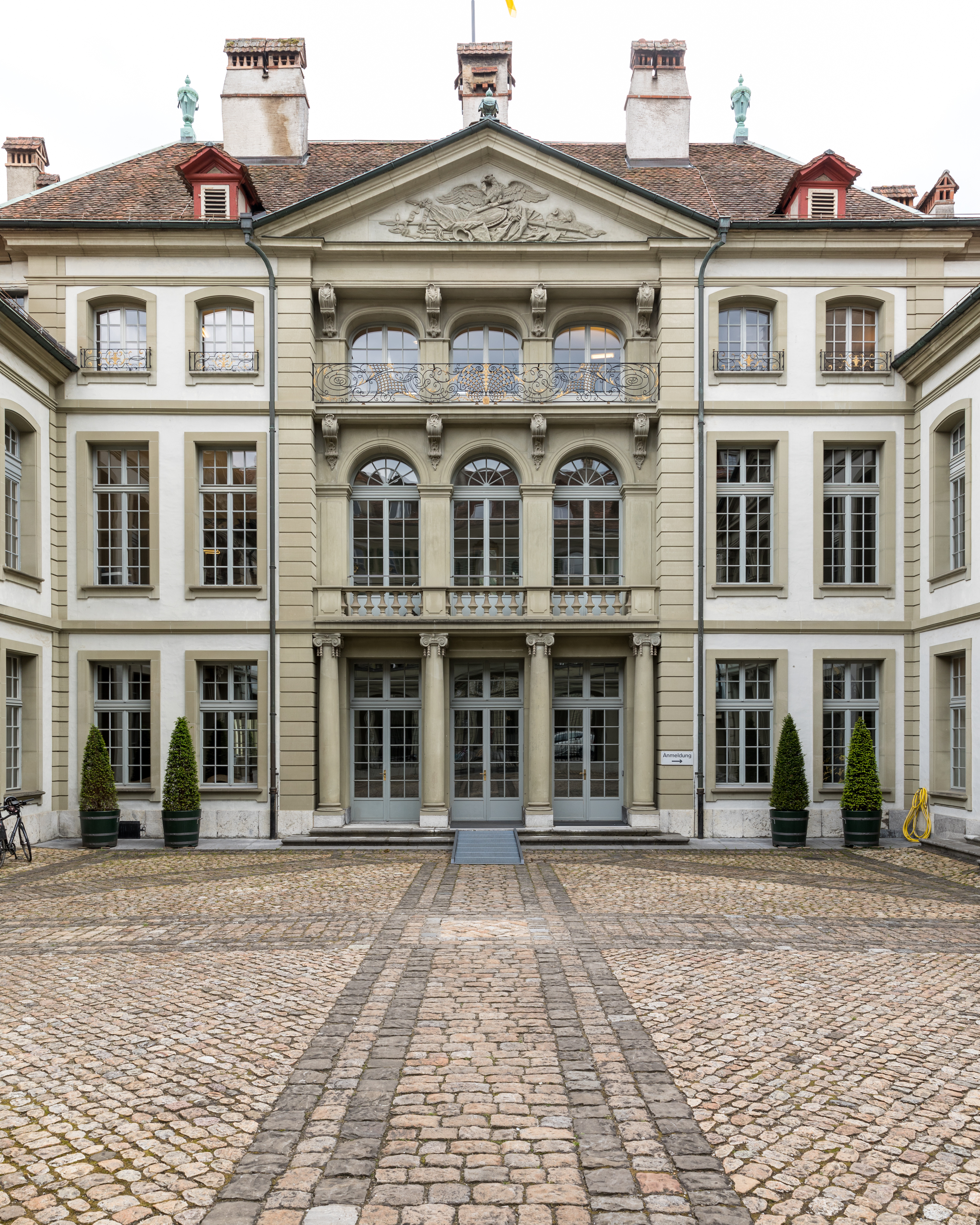
Erlacherhof, in Bern, meeting place of the Bern City Council.

The canton of Bern is divided into 342 municipalities. Under cantonal law, municipal executive authority is exercised by the municipal council (Gemeinderat).

Municipal regulations determine the number of council members, subject to a minimum of three. The council is chaired by the head of the municipality, commonly referred to as the mayor or president (Stadtpräsident or Stapi). In the city of Bern, members of the municipal executive are subject to a term-limit rule that prevents re-election after twelve consecutive years of service.

In several French-speaking municipalities of the canton of Bern, particularly in the Bernese Jura and the Biel/Bienne–Seeland administrative district, the municipal council is designated as the Conseil municipal. This terminology is used in municipalities such as Biel/Bienne, La Neuveville, Moutier, and Saint-Imier.

=== Lucerne ===
The canton of Lucerne is divided into 82 municipalities. Under cantonal law, municipalities are governed by a Gemeinderat (municipal council), which serves as the executive authority, although municipalities may assign it a different designation in their Gemeindeordnung.

The Gemeinderat consists of at least three members, with the exact number determined at the municipal level. Its members are elected for four-year terms and assume office on 1 September.

The Gemeinderat exercises subsidiary authority, performing municipal functions not assigned to other bodies. Its meetings are not open to the public.

In the city of Lucerne, executive authority is exercised by a Stadtrat, composed of five members; the same designation is used in Kriens, while Horw retains the title Gemeinderat.

=== Uri ===
The canton of Uri is divided into 20 municipalities. Under cantonal law, each municipality is governed by a Gemeinderat (municipal council). The council consists of at least five members, including the president, with the exact number specified in the municipality’s Gemeindeordnung. The length of members’ terms is determined by municipal law.

The Gemeinderat oversees the municipal administration, organizes municipal assemblies, and represents the municipality externally.

=== Schwyz ===
The canton of Schwyz is divided into 30 municipalities. Under cantonal law, municipal authority is exercised by a Gemeinderat (municipal council).

The Gemeinderat consists of the president of the municipality, the Säckelmeister (treasurer or director of finance), and three to seven additional members. Members are elected by majority vote. Terms of office are four years for regular members and two years for the president and Säckelmeister, with half of the council elected every two years. Elected members assume office no later than 1 July of the election year.

The Gemeinderat exercises subsidiary authority, performing functions not assigned to other municipal bodies.

=== Obwalden ===
The canton of Obwalden is divided into seven municipalities. The cantonal constitution establishes the legal framework for municipal governance, as there is no separate municipal law. Each municipality is governed by a Gemeinderat (municipal council), with members elected for four-year terms.

Comparison of Municipal Executives in the Canton of Obwalden
Municipality	Name	Number of Members
Alpnach	Einwohngemeinderat	5 members
Engelberg	Einwohngemeinderat	5 members
Giswil	Gemeinderat	7 members
Kerns	Einwohngemeinderat	7 members
Lungern	Gemeinderat	5 members
Sachseln	Einwohngemeinderat	7 members
Sarnen	Einwohngemeinderat	7 members

=== Nidwalden ===
In the canton of Nidwalden, municipalities with an ordinary organization (ordentliche Organisation) have an executive body called the administrativer Rat (administrative council). For organized municipalities, the executive is designated as the Gemeinderat (municipal council).

In both cases, the executive consists of three to eleven members, with the exact number determined by municipal regulations. Members are elected for four-year terms, either by the municipal assembly (open assembly) or by secret ballot, using majority vote or proportional representation as provided by municipal law.

The executive exercises subsidiary authority, performing functions not assigned to other municipal bodies.

Comparison of municipal executives in the canton of Nidwalden
Municipality	Name	Number of Members
Beckenried	Gemeinderat	7 members
Buochs	Gemeinderat	7 members
Dallenwil	Gemeinderat	5 members
Emmetten	Gemeinderat	7 members
Ennetbürgen	Gemeinderat	7 members
Ennetmoos	Gemeinderat	7 members
Hergiswil	Gemeinderat	7 members
Oberdorf	Gemeinderat	7 members
Stans	Gemeinderat	7 members
Stansstad	Gemeinderat	7 members
Wolfenschiessen	Gemeinderat	7 members

=== Glarus ===
The canton of Glarus is divided into three municipalities: Glarus, Glarus Nord, and Glarus Süd. Under cantonal law, each municipality is governed by a Vorsteherschaft (presidency), composed of the president and at least four members, with the length of their terms determined by municipal law.

The Vorsteherschaft functions as a collegial body.

In all three municipalities, the executive is referred to as the Gemeinderat (municipal council) and consists of seven members elected for four-year terms.

=== Zug ===
The canton of Zug is divided into eleven municipalities. Under cantonal law, the municipal executive is called the Gemeinderat (municipal council) and normally consists of five members, with the municipal secretary (Gemeindeschreiber) holding an advisory vote. Municipal regulations may provide for an increase in membership to seven.

The Gemeinderat exercises subsidiary authority, represents the municipality externally, and is chaired by the president.

Comparison of municipal executives in the canton of Zug
Municipality	Name	Number of Members
Baar	Gemeinderat	7 members
Cham	Gemeinderat	5 members
Hunenberg	Gemeinderat	5 members
Menzingen	Gemeinderat	5 members
Neuheim	Gemeinderat	5 members
Oberägeri	Gemeinderat	5 members
Risch	Gemeinderat	5 members
Steinhausen	Gemeinderat	5 members
Unterägeri	Gemeinderat	5 members
Walchwil	Gemeinderat	5 members
Zug	Stadtrat	5 members

=== Fribourg ===
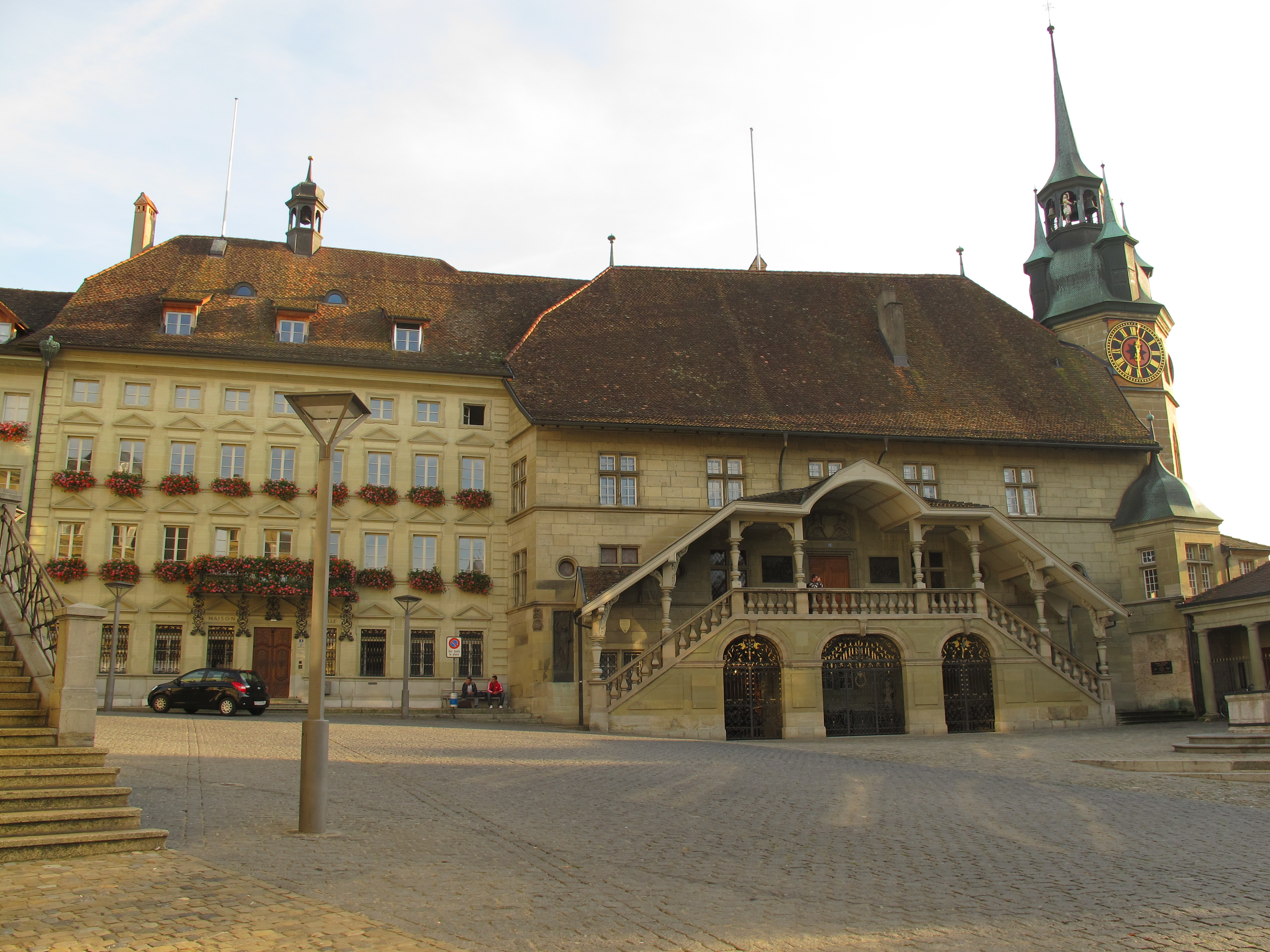
Fribourg City Hall, seat of the Fribourg Municipal Council.

The canton of Fribourg is divided into 133 municipalities. Under cantonal law, the municipal executive is called the conseil communal (municipal council, Gemeinderat in German) and is responsible for directing and administering the municipality. The council is headed by the syndic.

Members of the municipal council are elected for five-year terms, concurrently with the general council (the legislative body) during general elections.

The municipal council exercises subsidiary authority.

The number of council members is determined by cantonal law, although municipalities may establish a different composition:

From	To	Number of Councilors
0	600 inhabitants	5 members
600 inhabitants	1,200 inhabitants	7 members
From 1,200 inhabitants		9 members

For municipalities required to have a municipal parliament, the number of councilors is determined according to cantonal regulations:

Comparison of the Number of Municipal Councilors in Certain Fribourg Communes
Municipality	Population (as of December 31, 2018)	Number of Councilors
Fribourg	38,365 habitants	5 members
Bulle	23,439 habitants	9 members
Morat/Murten	8,279 habitants	7 members
Romont	5,280 habitants	9 members
Estavayer	9,716 habitants	9 members
Châtel-Saint-Denis	6,971 habitants	9 members
Marly	8,193 habitants	9 members
Villars-sur-Glâne	12,094 habitants	9 members

=== Solothurn ===
The canton of Solothurn is divided into 109 municipalities. Under cantonal law, the municipal executive is called the Gemeinderat (municipal council) and consists of at least three members. Members are generally elected by proportional representation, although municipal law may provide for majority elections under an extraordinary organizational framework (ausserordentliche Organisation).

In the cantonal capital, Solothurn, which does not have a municipal parliament, the Gemeinderat comprises 30 members elected for four-year terms. Olten, the most populous city in the canton and equipped with a municipal parliament, has an executive called the Stadtrat, composed of five members. Grenchen, the second most populous city, has a Gemeinderat of fifteen members.

=== Basel-Stadt ===
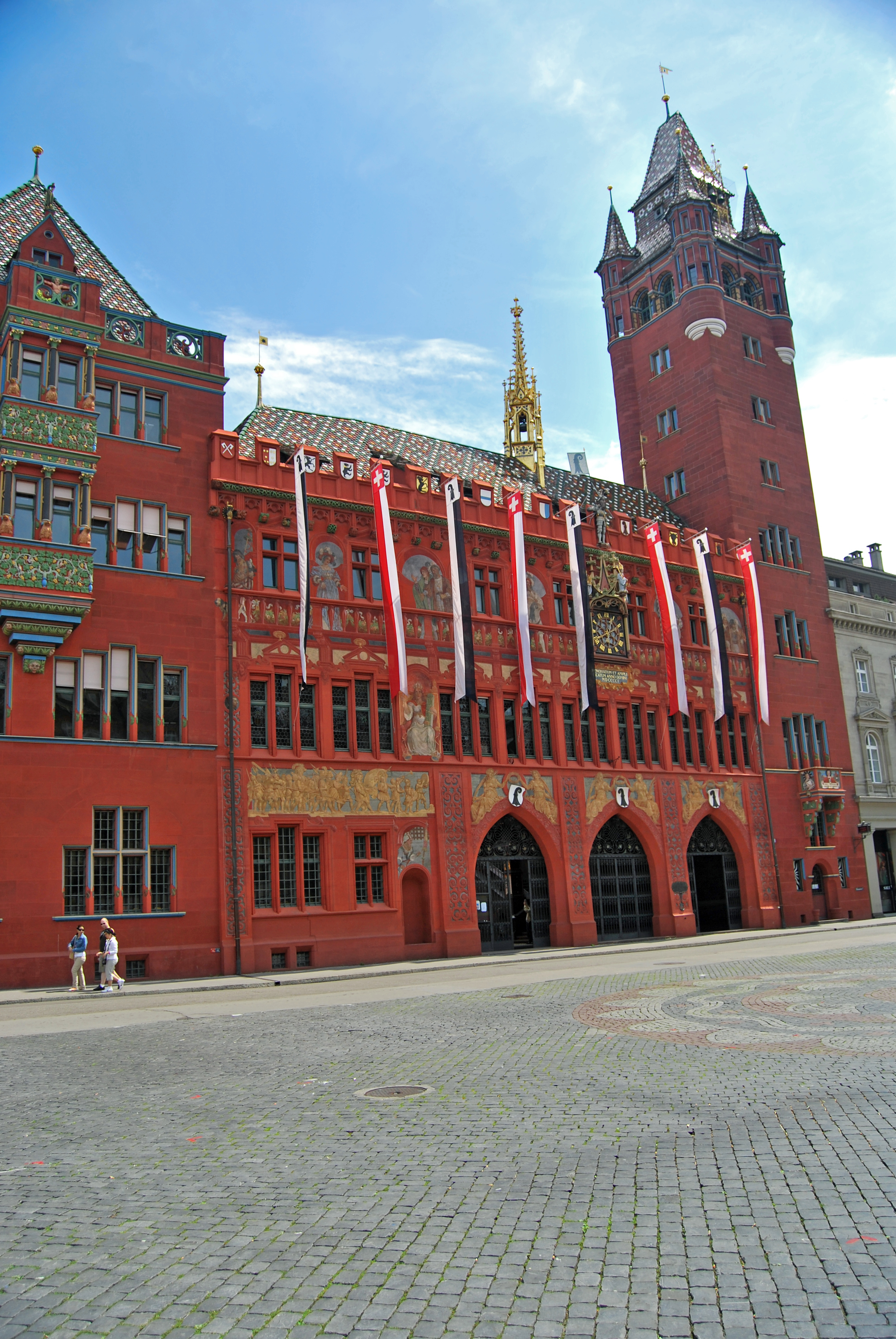
The Rathaus in Basel, seat of the cantonal authorities and also of the executive of the municipality of Basel (the Regierungsrat).

The canton of Basel-Stadt is divided into three municipalities: Basel, Riehen, and Bettingen.

The municipality of Basel is administered directly by the cantonal authorities, and its executive is the Regierungsrat (executive council) of Basel-Stadt, composed of seven members elected every four years. (Note: As a consequence, all inhabitants of the canton of Basel-Stadt elect the executive of the municipality of Basel. Basel is the only municipality in Switzerland whose executive is elected by the entire canton.) In Riehen and Bettingen, the executive is called the Gemeinderat (municipal council) and must include at least three members, including the president. The Gemeinderat of Riehen comprises seven members, while that of Bettingen comprises five members.

=== Basel-Landschaft ===
The canton of Basel-Landschaft is divided into 86 municipalities. Under cantonal law, the municipal executive is called the Gemeinderat (municipal council). Its number of members is determined by municipal law, with a minimum of three. Members are elected for four-year terms and take office on 1 June. The Gemeinderat is supervised by the cantonal government (Regierungsrat), represents the municipality externally, and exercises certain penal powers under municipal law.

In the cantonal capital, Liestal, the executive is called the Stadtrat (city council) and is composed of five members.

=== Schaffhausen ===
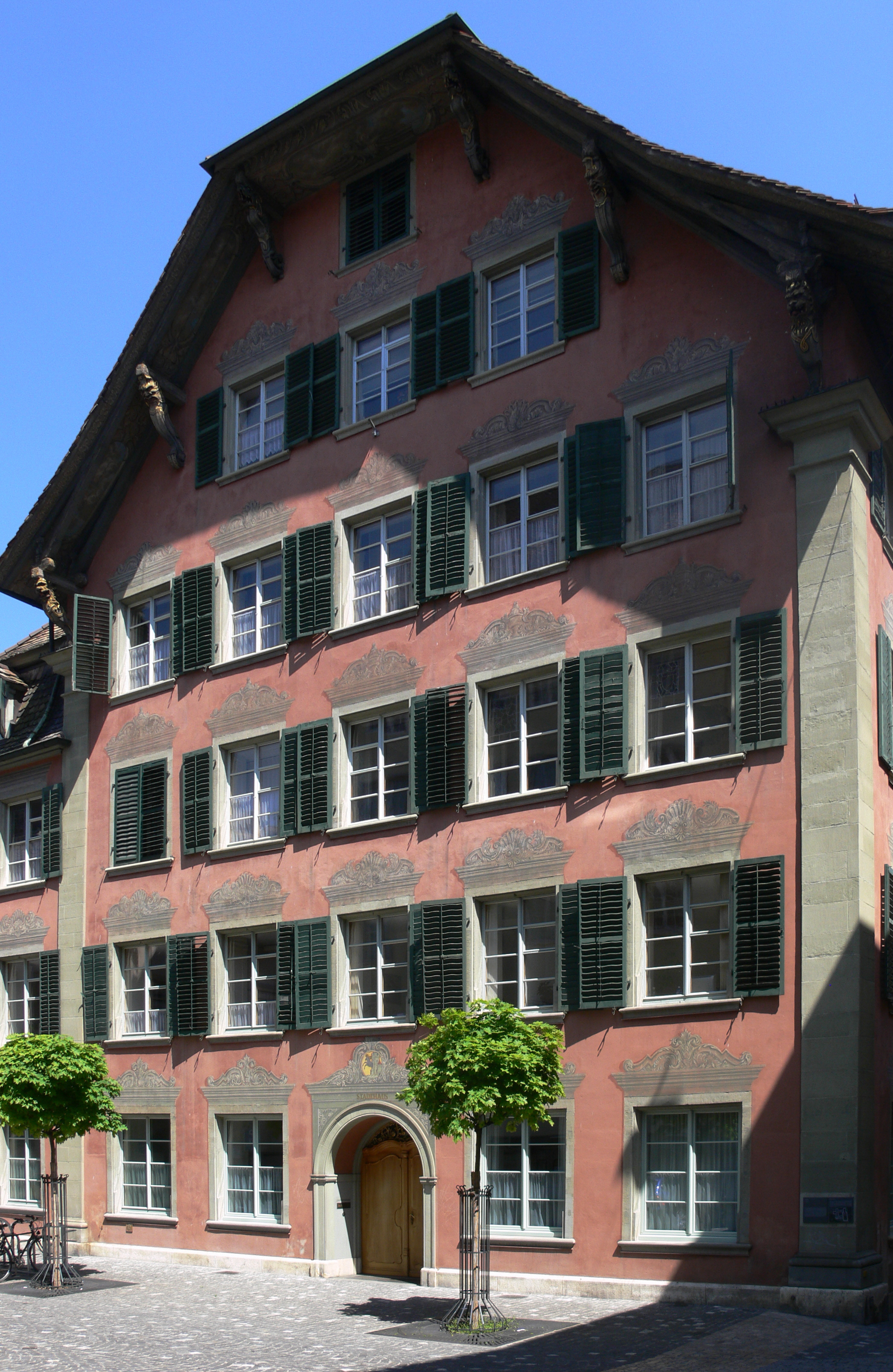
Schaffhausen Town Hall, seat of the municipal authorities.

The canton of Schaffhausen is divided into 26 municipalities. Cantonal law provides that the executive of a municipality is called the Gemeinderat (municipal council), except in Schaffhausen and Stein am Rhein, where it is called the Stadtrat (city council).

The number of members is determined by the municipal constitution (Gemeindeverfassung), with a minimum of three and a maximum of seven. Municipal law establishes the length of the term of office. All municipal executives have five members, elected for four years.

The executive represents the municipality externally and exercises subsidiary competence.

Municipal executives in the canton of Schaffhausen
Municipality	Population (in 2018)	Name	Number of members	Term of office
Bargen	313 habitants	Gemeinderat	5 members	NC
Beggingen	476 habitants	Gemeinderat	5 members	NC
Beringen	4,804 habitants	Gemeinderat	5 members	NC
Buch	316 habitants	Gemeinderat	5 members	NC
Buchberg	866 habitants	NC	5 members	NC
Büttenhardt	416 habitants	Gemeinderat	5 members	NC
Dörflingen	1,028 habitants	Gemeinderat	5 members	NC
Gächlingen	836 habitants	Gemeinderat	5 members	4 years
Hallau	2,221 habitants	Gemeinderat	5 members	4 years
Hemishofen	468 habitants	Gemeinderat	5 members	NC
Lohn	758 habitants	Gemeinderat	5 members	NC
Löhningen	1,472 habitants	Gemeinderat	5 members	NC
Merishausen	859 habitants	Gemeinderat	5 members	4 years
Neuhausen am Rheinfall	10,512 habitants	Gemeinderat	5 members	NC
Neunkirch	2 289 habitants	Gemeinderat	5 members	4 years
Oberhallau	444 habitants	Gemeinderat	5 members	4 years
Ramsen	1,469 habitants	Gemeinderat	5 members	NC
Rüdlingen	750 habitants	Gemeinderat	5 members	NC
Schaffhouse	36,587 habitants	Stadrat	5 members	4 years
Schleitheim	1,681 habitants	Gemeinderat	5 members	NC
Siblingen	886 habitants	Gemeinderat	5 members	4 years
Stein am Rhein	3,415 habitants	Stadtrat	5 members	4 years
Stetten	1 351 habitants	Gemeinderat	5 members	NC
Thayngen	5,453 habitants	Gemeinderat	5 members	NC
Trasadingen	584 habitants	Gemeinderat	5 members	NC
Wilchingen	1,737 habitants	Gemeinderat	5 members	4 years

=== Appenzell Innerrhoden ===
The canton of Appenzell Innerrhoden is divided into districts (Bezirke) rather than political municipalities. (Note: It nevertheless has school municipalities and religious municipalities.) Cantonal constitutional law provides that each district is governed by a district council (Bezirksrat), composed of at least five members elected by the district assembly (Bezirksgemeinde). District law determines the length of the council members’ terms of office.

Comparison of district councils in Appenzell Innerrhoden
Municipality	Population (in 2018)	Number of members	Term of office
Appenzell	5,795 habitants	7 members	NC
Gonten	1,462 habitants	5 members	4 years
Oberegg	1,916 habitants	7 members	4 years
Rüte	3,648 habitants	7 members	1 year
Schlatt-Haslen	1,128 habitants	5 members	NC
Schwende	2,196 habitants	5 members	NC

=== Appenzell Ausserrhoden ===
The canton of Appenzell Ausserrhoden is divided into 20 municipalities. Cantonal law provides that each municipal executive is called the Gemeinderat (municipal council), composed of at least five members elected for a four-year term.

Comparison of executives in the municipalities of Appenzell Ausserrhoden
Municipality	Population (in 2018)	Name of the executive	Number of members
Bühler	1,799 habitants	Gemeinderat	7 members
Gais	3,091 habitants	Gemeinderat	7 members
Grub	1,008 habitants	Gemeinderat	7 members
Heiden	4,162 habitants	Gemeinderat	7 members
Herisau	15,745 habitants	Gemeinderat	7 members
Hundwil	941 habitants	Gemeinderat	7 members
Lutzenberg	1,279 habitants	Gemeinderat	7 members
Rehetobel	1,747 habitants	Gemeinderat	7 members
Reute	688 habitants	Gemeinderat	7 members
Schönengrund	532 habitants	Gemeinderat	5 members
Schwellbrunn	1,573 habitants	Gemeinderat	7 members
Speicher	4,382 habitants	Gemeinderat	7 members
Stein	1,429 habitants	Gemeinderat	9 members
Teufen	6,265 habitants	Gemeinderat	9 members
Trogen	1,735 habitants	Gemeinderat	7 members
Urnäsch	2,303 habitants	Gemeinderat	9 membres
Wald	877 habitants	Gemeinderat	7 members
Waldstatt	1,870 habitants	Gemeinderat	7 members
Walzenhausen	1,971 habitants	Gemeinderat	5 members
Wolfhalden	1,837 habitants	Gemeinderat	7 members

=== St. Gallen ===
The canton of St. Gallen is divided into 133 municipalities. Cantonal law provides that each municipal executive is called Rat, more specifically Gemeinderat (municipal council) or Stadtrat (city council), and must be composed of at least three members with a four-year term of office.

In the four most populous municipalities—St. Gallen (five members), Rapperswil-Jona (seven members), Wil (five members), and Gossau (five members)—the executive is designated Stadtrat. Uzwil, the fifth most populous municipality, has a Gemeinderat composed of seven members.

=== Graubünden ===
The canton of Graubünden is divided into 105 municipalities. Cantonal law designates the municipal executive as Gemeindevorstand (municipal committee) and requires it to have at least three members, elected for a four-year term. Municipal law may assign an alternative designation to the executive.

The Gemeindevorstand represents the municipality externally and is vested with subsidiary competence.

In Chur, the executive is called Stadtrat (city council) and is composed of three members, while in Davos it is called Kleiner Stadtrat (small city council) and is composed of five members.

=== Aargau ===
The canton of Aargau is divided into 210 municipalities. Cantonal law distinguishes between municipalities with a municipal parliament and those without, but in both cases the municipal executive is called Gemeinderat (municipal council).

The Gemeinderat consists of the Gemeindeammann (Note: In the Middle Ages, the word Ammann referred to an official of the king or a lord who was responsible, among other things, for administering justice; over time, this role evolved into an elected position in municipalities, that of municipal president. See Peter Steiner (translated by Anne Berlincourt), Amman in the Historical Dictionary of Switzerland online, version dated July 10, 2001.) (president), the Vizeammann (vice-president), and three, five, or seven additional members. Members serve four-year terms. The municipal executive is responsible for the administration and implementation of municipal decisions, represents the municipality externally, and is vested with subsidiary competence. It also performs certain functions within the framework of criminal procedure.

In the cities of Aarau, Baden, and Bremgarten, the municipal executive is called Stadtrat (city council) and is composed of seven members.

=== Thurgau ===
The canton of Thurgau is divided into 80 municipalities. Cantonal law provides that the municipal executive is called Gemeindebehörde (municipal authority). Municipal law determines the number of members, which must be at least five, and the length of their term, while the Regierungsrat (cantonal government) sets the starting date of the term.

In the cities of Frauenfeld, Kreuzlingen, and Arbon, the municipal executive is called Stadtrat (city council) and is composed of five members. In Amriswil, the executive bears the same designation but consists of nine members.

=== Ticino ===
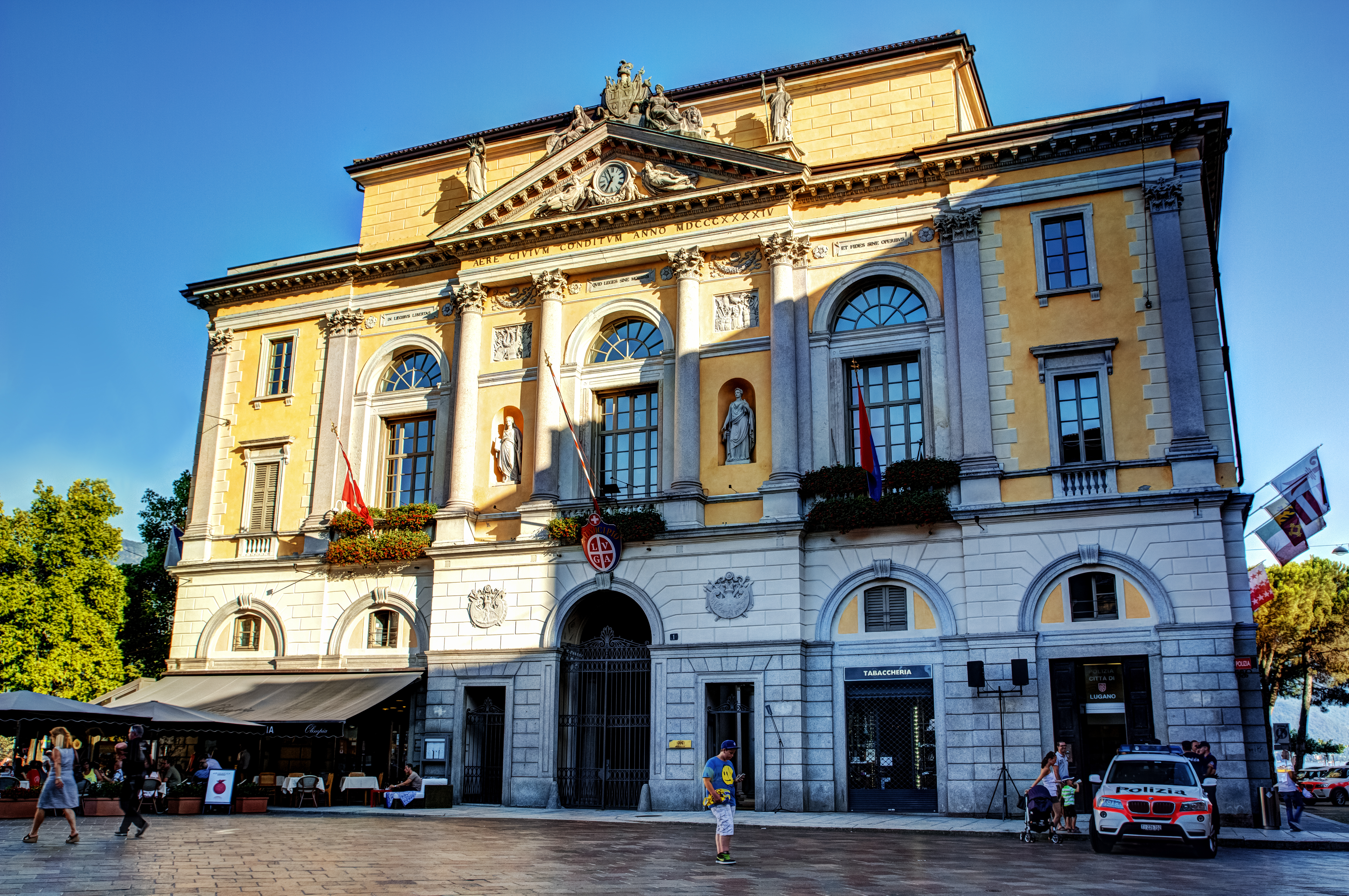
Municipality of Lugano, meeting place of the city council (on the first floor, at flag level).

The canton of Ticino is divided into 112 municipalities. Cantonal law provides that the municipal executive is called municipio. Members are elected for four years and take office by swearing fidelity to the Constitution and laws before the justice of the peace.

A municipio must have an odd number of members, not exceeding seven. Membership is incompatible with serving on the Council of State, holding a cantonal civil service position, or being a member of the judiciary. Relatives in the direct line may not serve on the same municipio, except in municipalities with fewer than 300 inhabitants.

The municipio is chaired by the sindaco (mayor), who represents the municipality externally. Cantonal law requires that the municipio hold meetings in designated municipal premises rather than private spaces.

Members of the municipio (municipali) are vested with local police powers and may, in that capacity, conduct searches of dwellings in accordance with federal administrative procedure.

=== Vaud ===
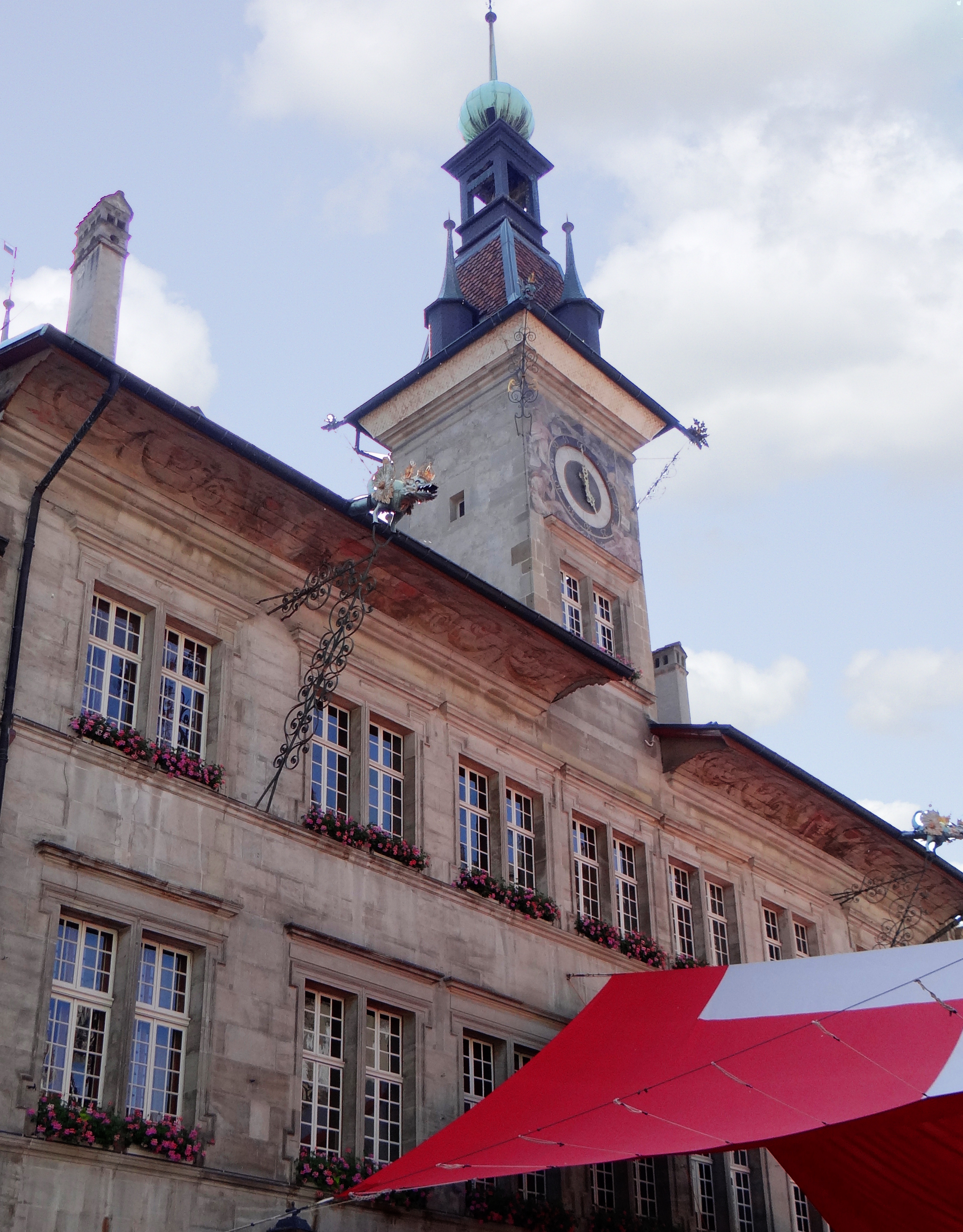
Lausanne City Hall, seat of the municipal authorities.

The canton of Vaud is divided into 309 municipalities. Cantonal law provides that the municipal executive is called the municipalité.

The municipalité is composed of three, five, seven, or nine members (municipaux), with the exact number determined by municipal law. Relatives in the direct line may not serve on the same municipalité.

Members are elected for five years and take office after swearing an oath to the Federal Constitution and the cantonal Constitution of Vaud. The body functions collegially and is presided over by the syndic, who holds specific powers related to the preservation of evidence in criminal proceedings.

=== Valais ===
The canton of Valais is divided into 122 municipalities. Cantonal law provides that the municipal executive is called conseil communal or conseil municipal, with conseil communal generally used in smaller municipalities and conseil municipal in larger ones, such as Sion or Monthey. The executive is composed of an odd number of members, ranging from three to fifteen, and is headed by the president of the municipality. Members are elected for a four-year term.

=== Neuchâtel ===
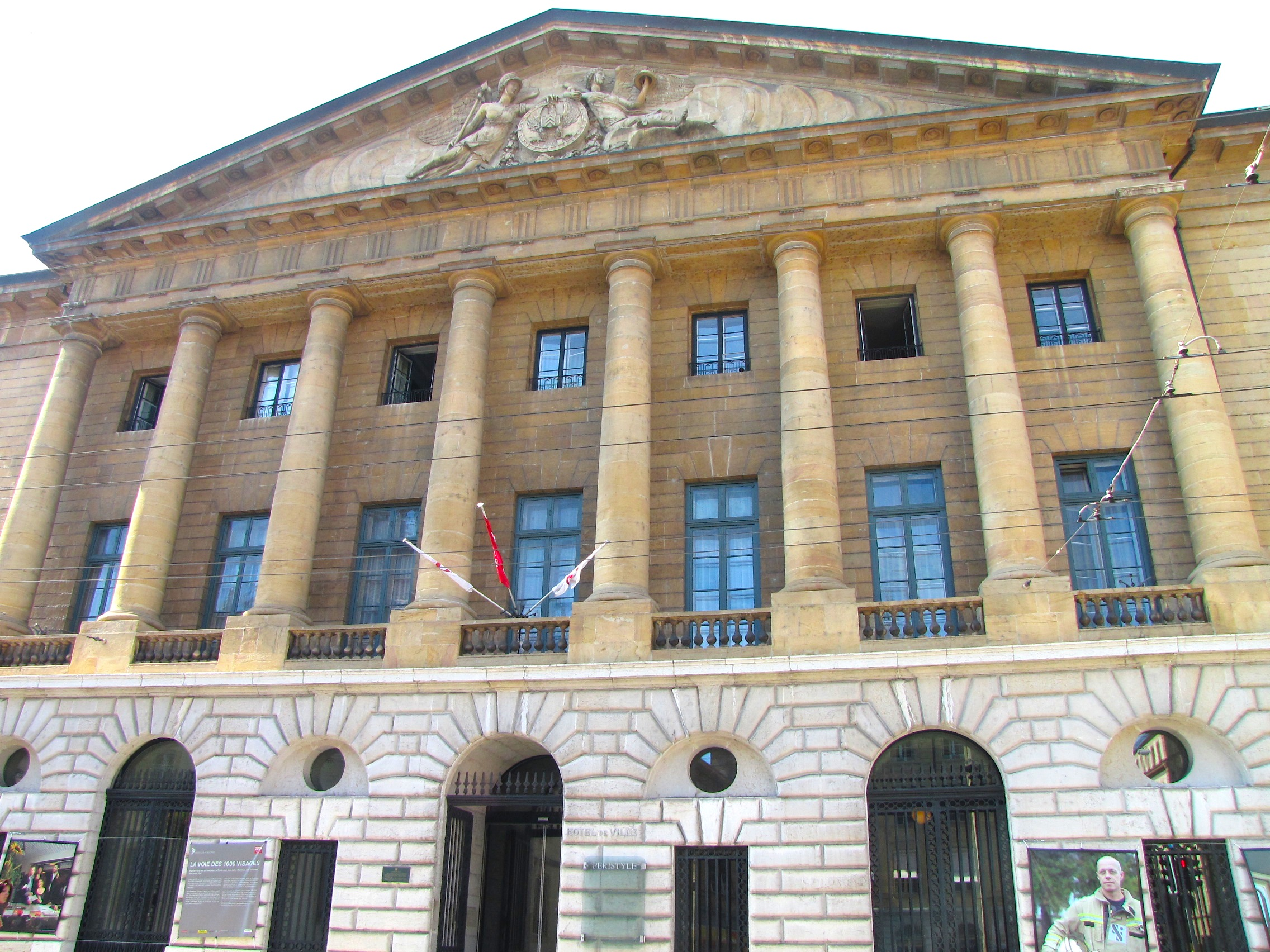
Neuchâtel City Hall, seat of the municipal authorities.

The canton of Neuchâtel is divided into 31 municipalities. Cantonal law provides that the municipal executive is called conseil communal and is composed of three, five, or seven members, with the exact number and method of election determined by municipal law.

The conseil communal represents the municipality externally, including in legal proceedings, appoints the civil registrar (subject to ratification by the Council of State), and exercises subsidiary competence. It is headed by the president of the conseil communal, who is often referred to as the president of the municipality.

Cantonal law establishes a procedure for the dismissal of a municipal councillor by the conseil général for “just cause,” such as a conviction for a criminal offence incompatible with the exercise of municipal office. This procedure may also apply to the entire conseil communal, in which case it is referred to as the dissolution of the conseil communal.

=== Geneva ===
The canton of Geneva is divided into 45 municipalities. Until 2025, cantonal law provided that the executive of municipalities with more than 3,000 inhabitants was called the conseil administratif (administrative council), while municipalities with fewer than 3,000 inhabitants—24 of the 45 municipalities at the end of 2021—were administered by a mayor and two deputies. Following an amendment to the Constitution approved by popular vote on 28 November 2021, all municipalities are now governed by an administrative council. This council is composed of three members in most municipalities and five members in municipalities with more than 50,000 inhabitants, such as the city of Geneva.

Members of the municipal executive are elected every five years (Note: Their term of office was four years before the new Geneva Constitution came into force on June 1, 2013. ("Le projet de Constitution accepté par l'assemblée constituante genevoise" [The draft Constitution accepted by the Geneva Constituent Assembly]. RTS (in French). May 31, 2012.).) by a two-round majority vote, with the first round held concurrently with the election of the municipal council, the legislative body. The number of members of the executive is determined by a decree of the Council of State based on the municipality's population.

The administrative council assigns departmental responsibilities among its members and annually appoints a president, titled mayor, and a vice-president, with their term beginning on 1 June.

Representation of the municipality is exercised by the administrative council or the mayor. The council submits candidates for the position of civil registrar to the Council of State.

Members of the administrative council may be removed by the Council of State for health reasons.

=== Jura ===
The canton of Jura is divided into 53 municipalities. Cantonal law provides that the municipal executive is called the conseil communal (municipal council).

The number of councillors is determined by municipal law, with a minimum of three in municipalities with fewer than 50 eligible voters and at least five in larger municipalities. Councillors are elected for five-year terms.

The municipal council represents the municipality externally and has the authority to initiate and conduct legal proceedings.

The office of municipal councillor is incompatible with membership in the cantonal government. Municipal law may establish additional rules regarding incompatibilities, and relatives in the direct line may not serve on the same council.

== See also ==
- Cantonal legislatures of Switzerland
- Cantonal executive bodies of Switzerland

== Bibliography ==
- Auer, Andreas (2016). Staatsrecht der schweizerischen Kantone [Constitutional law of the Swiss cantons] (in German). Berne: Stämpfli. ISBN 978-3-7272-3217-6.
- Geser, Hans; Meuli, Urs; Ladner, Andreas; Steiner, Reto; Horber-Papazian, Katia (2011). Die Exekutivmitglieder in den Schweizer Gemeinden [The executive members in Swiss municipalities] (PDF) (in German). Glarus/Chur: Rüegger Verlag. ISBN 978-3-7253-0943-6.
- Ladner, Andreas; Amsellen, Ada (2019). "Die Vertretung der Frauen in den kommunalenExekutiven" [The representation of women in local government executive bodies] (PDF). DeFacto (in German).
- Ladner, Andreas (2019). "Die FDP ist die Partei der Gemeindepräsidenten" [The FDP is the party of municipal presidents] (PDF). DeFacto (in German).
