= Cantonal Council of Appenzell Ausserrhoden =

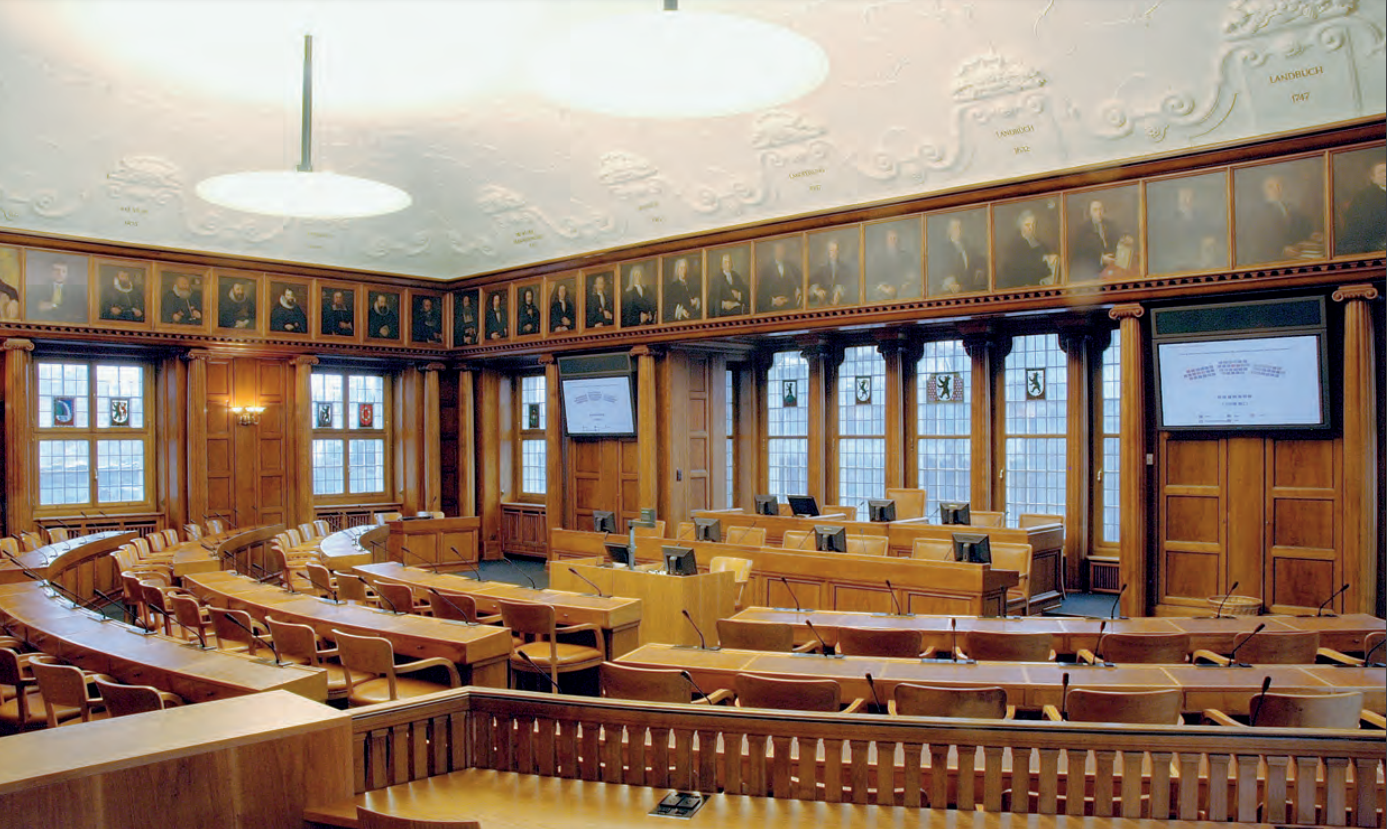
Cantonal Council Chamber in Herisau.

The Cantonal Council of Appenzell Ausserrhoden is the parliament of the canton of Appenzell Ausserrhoden. It meets in the Cantonal Council Chamber in the government building in Herisau and is the legislative and supreme supervisory authority of the canton. Its 65 members are elected for four years in 20 constituencies using the majority system, with the exception of the Herisau constituency, where proportional representation is used. The cantonal council issues all fundamental and important provisions in the form of laws. It usually meets seven times a year.

== Role ==
Basic provisions for the cantonal council can be found in the Constitution of Appenzell Ausserrhoden.

The 65 members of the cantonal council are elected for a term of four years. The council exercises supreme power, subject to the rights of the people. It passes laws and supervises the state bodies of the canton, i.e. the Government Council, courts and other authorities. The cantonal council approves or terminates international and inter-cantonal treaties, unless it falls within the competence of the Government Council.

The cantonal council advises on the material, financial and investment planning as well as other basic planning of the Government Council. It decides on new one-off expenditure for the same item amounting to 1–5 percent of a tax unit and on new recurring expenditure amounting to 0.5–1 percent of a tax unit.

The office of the cantonal council initially consists of the president and two vice-presidents; they are elected in a constitutive meeting in June for a period of one year. Immediate re-election is not permitted. In addition, the council clerk is a member of the council office, which forms the executive board of the cantonal council.

The extended office includes the members of the office, the parliamentary group presidents and a member appointed by the non-party-affiliated cantonal councillors.

== Committees ==
The Cantonal Council of Appenzell Ausserrhoden has the following permanent committees:

- Audit committee (GPK)
- Finance Commission (KF)
- Commission for Education and Culture (KBK)
- Commission for Health and Social Affairs (KGS)
- Commission for Construction and Economics (KBV)
- Commission for Home Affairs and Security (KIS)

The cantonal council elects the members and presidents of the standing committees at the beginning of each term of office.

== Parties ==
Since the cantonal councils are elected in 19 of 20 constituencies using the majority system, the strength of the parties plays only a minor role. The distribution of seats in the council since 2003 has been as follows:

Distribution of seats after the elections between 2003 and 2023
Party	2003	2007	2011	2015	2019	2023	Seat allocation 2023	Voter share in percent
FDP.Die Liberalen (FDP)	31	26	24	24	24	22		
Sozialdemokratische Partei der Schweiz (SP)	5	4	5	6	9	10		
Schweizerische Volkspartei (SVP)	11	8	10	12	7	7		
Die Mitte	2	3	3	5	3	3		
Evangelische Volkspartei (EVP)		2	1	1	2	2		
Grünliberale Partei (GLP)						2		
Non-partisan	16	22	22	18	20	19		

The majority system in most constituencies means that many non-party politicians can be elected to the cantonal council. However, they can join a parliamentary group or form one themselves. The cantonal councillors from the centre, GLP and EVP decided to form a joint cantonal council faction after the election. One of the decisive factors was the close proximity in terms of content. Three other cantonal councillors elected as independents also joined the SP faction, and another independent joined the centre/GLP/EVP faction.

The current party strengths are as follows:

Fraktion	Seats	change to 2023
FDP	21	− 1
PU	15	
SP	13	
SVP	8	+ 1
Mitte / GLP / EVP	8	

== Members ==
=== Eligibility ===
Article 63 of the cantonal constitution stipulates that members of the government council and the judiciary cannot be members of the cantonal council. Members of the cantonal administration who are directly subordinate to the government council or one of its members cannot sit on the cantonal council.

=== Number and distribution across constituencies ===
According to Article 71, Paragraph 4 of the cantonal constitution, the municipalities are the electoral districts. The number of seats is determined by the number of inhabitants, with each municipality providing at least one representative. The 65 representatives are distributed as follows.

Coat of arms	Municipality name	Population: 31. December 2023	Seats
Bühler	Bühler	1954	2
Gais	Gais	3147	4
Grub	Grub	971	1
Heiden	Heiden	4316	5
Herisau	Herisau	15'893	18
Hundwil	Hundwil	944	1
Lutzenberg	Lutzenberg	1332	2
Rehetobel	Rehetobel	1773	2
Reute	Reute	700	1
Schönengrund	Schönengrund	556	1
Schwellbrunn	Schwellbrunn	1557	2
Speicher	Speicher	4453	5
Stein	Stein	1498	2
Teufen	Teufen	6514	7
Trogen	Trogen	1862	2
Urnäsch	Urnäsch	2346	3
Wald	Wald	909	1
Waldstatt	Waldstatt	1874	2
Walzenhausen	Walzenhausen	2029	2
Wolfhalden	Wolfhalden	1867	2

=== Compensation ===
The cantonal council and committee meetings are remunerated at 150 francs for half a day or 300 francs for a full day.

In addition, the following annual allowances apply:

==== Groups ====
- 5,000 Swiss francs each

==== Office ====
- President of the cantonal council – 8,000 francs
- 1st vice president – 1,000 Swiss francs

==== Audit committee ====
- President – 6,000 francs
- Members – 3,000 francs

==== Other standing committees ====
- President – 1,000 francs
