= Silvesterklaus =

Festival role in Appenzell, Switzerland

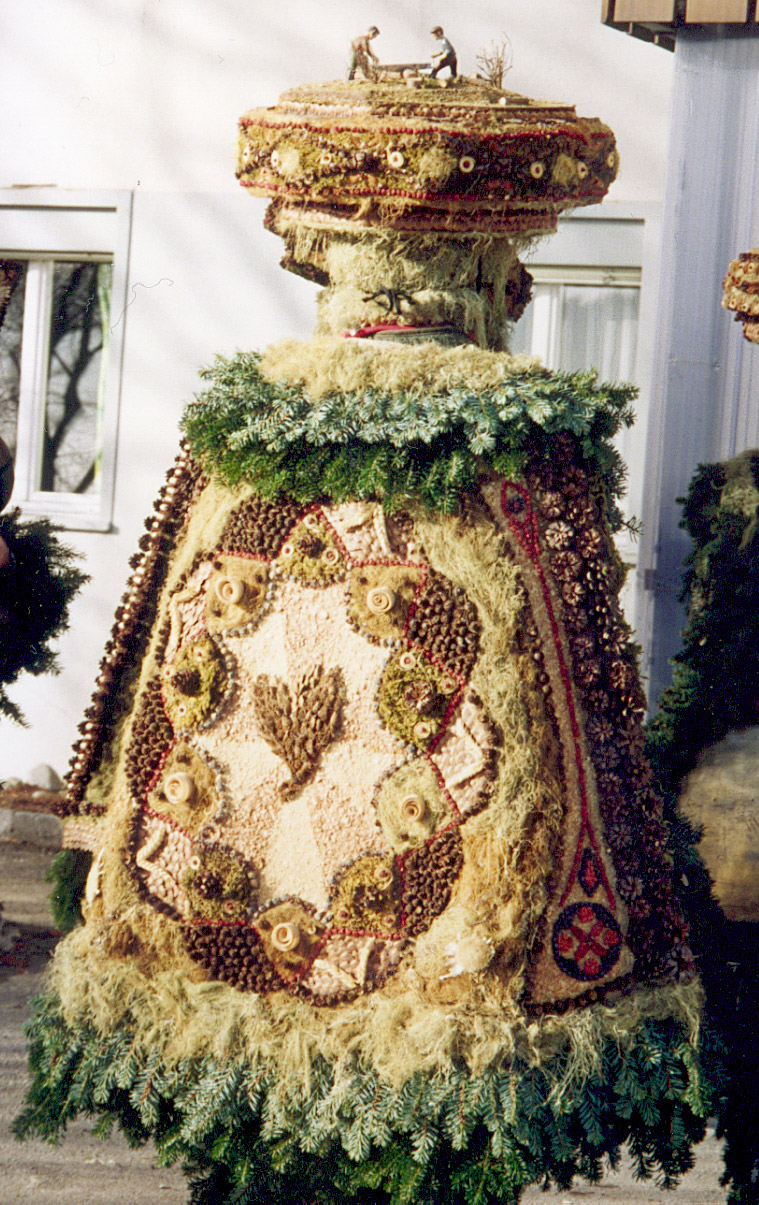
Silvesterklaus in Schwellbrunn.

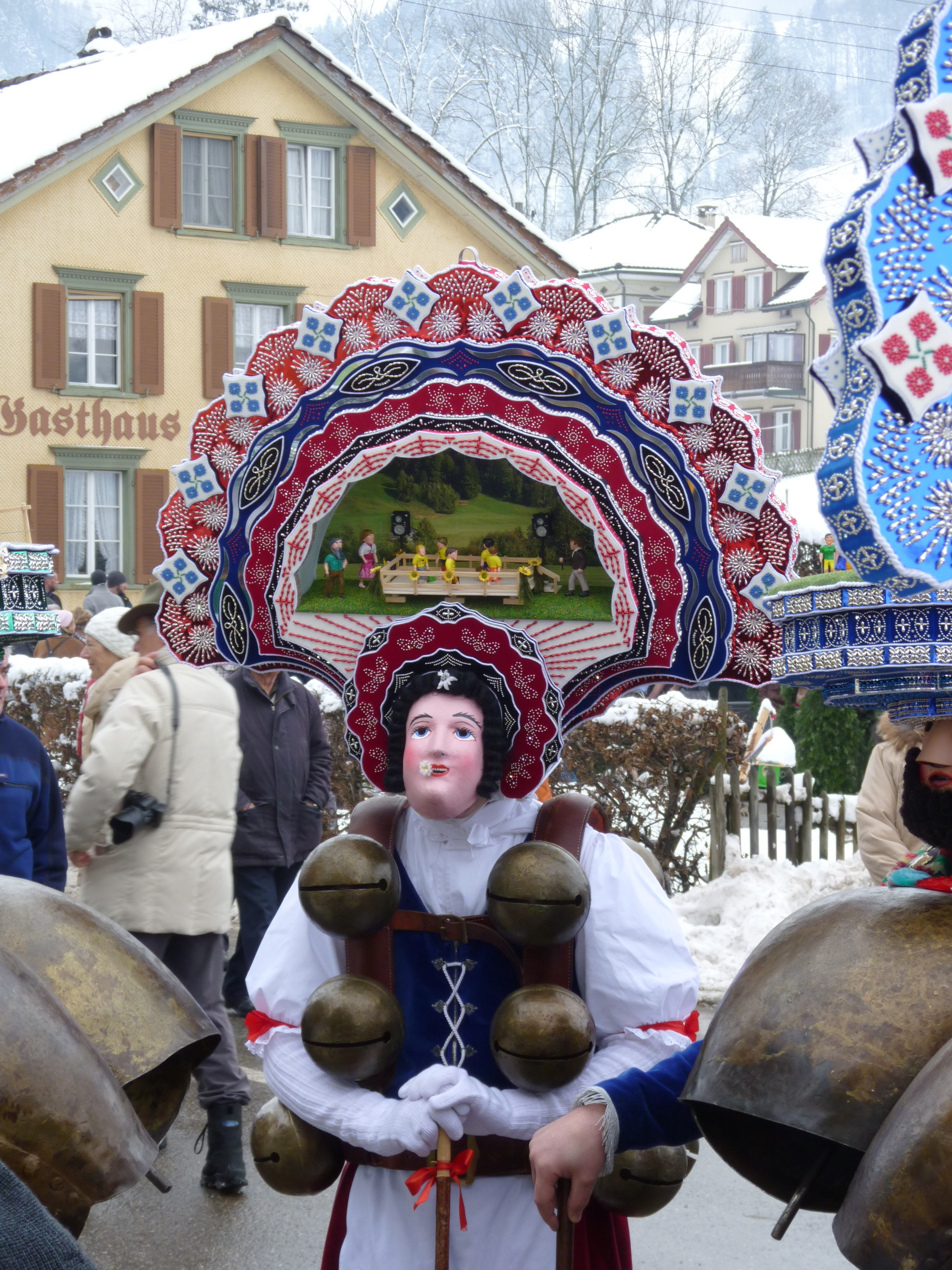
Silvesterkläuse in the Old Sylvester, 13 January 2010.

Silvesterklaus is a masked person taking part in Saint Sylvester's Day festivities in Appenzell, Switzerland, and thus contributing to maintain the Chlausen tradition. A Silvesterklaus or New Year's Mummer (Chlaus in Swiss German) is dressed up as a Saint Sylvester or New Year's Eve character. In the Reformed half-canton of Appenzell Ausserrhoden, the turn of the year is still celebrated in this way. The Silvesterklausen is part of Switzerland’s intangible cultural heritage.

== History ==
Saint Sylvester, or New Year's Eve, is commemorated twice, once according to the Gregorian calendar on 31 December and again according to the Julian calendar on 13 January. The Silvesterkläuse put on their strange costumes and, ringing huge bells and singing a very slow yodel, deambulate in small groups from house to house, to wish the people a happy new year. If 31 December or 13 January falls on a Sunday, the ceremony is celebrated on the preceding Saturday.

It is assumed that the Chlausen festival does not have pagan origins, but goes back to a late medieval Advent tradition involving students of a monastic school. In the 15th century, with the celebrations becoming increasingly wild and carnival-like, the Catholic Church must have found that such behaviour hardly befitted the Advent season, which in turn may explain why the Chlausen custom was transferred from the Advent season to New Year's Eve.

The tradition is first mentioned in 1663, when church authorities objected to such a noisy behaviour. In the Catholic half-canton of Appenzell Innerrhoden (AI), according to some 18th-century records, taking part in the "Chlausen" tradition was punished with a heavy fine of five thalers. Nevertheless, the tradition survived in the Catholic half-canton on a small scale up to 1900, more or less tacitly tolerated by the local district authorities. This happened especially in the border areas near to Reformed Appenzell Ausserrhoden, for example in Haslen, which is surrounded on three sides by the Ausserrhoden communities Hundwil, Stein, Teufen, and Buehler, or in Gonten, close to Urnäsch and Hundwil. There were also mixed groups, uniting members from Appenzell Innerrhoden and Appenzell Ausserrhoden (this still happens occasionally), and there were sometimes isolated characters too.

Nowadays, the tradition is kept alive in the Protestant half-canton of Appenzell Ausserrhoden (AR).

== Form ==
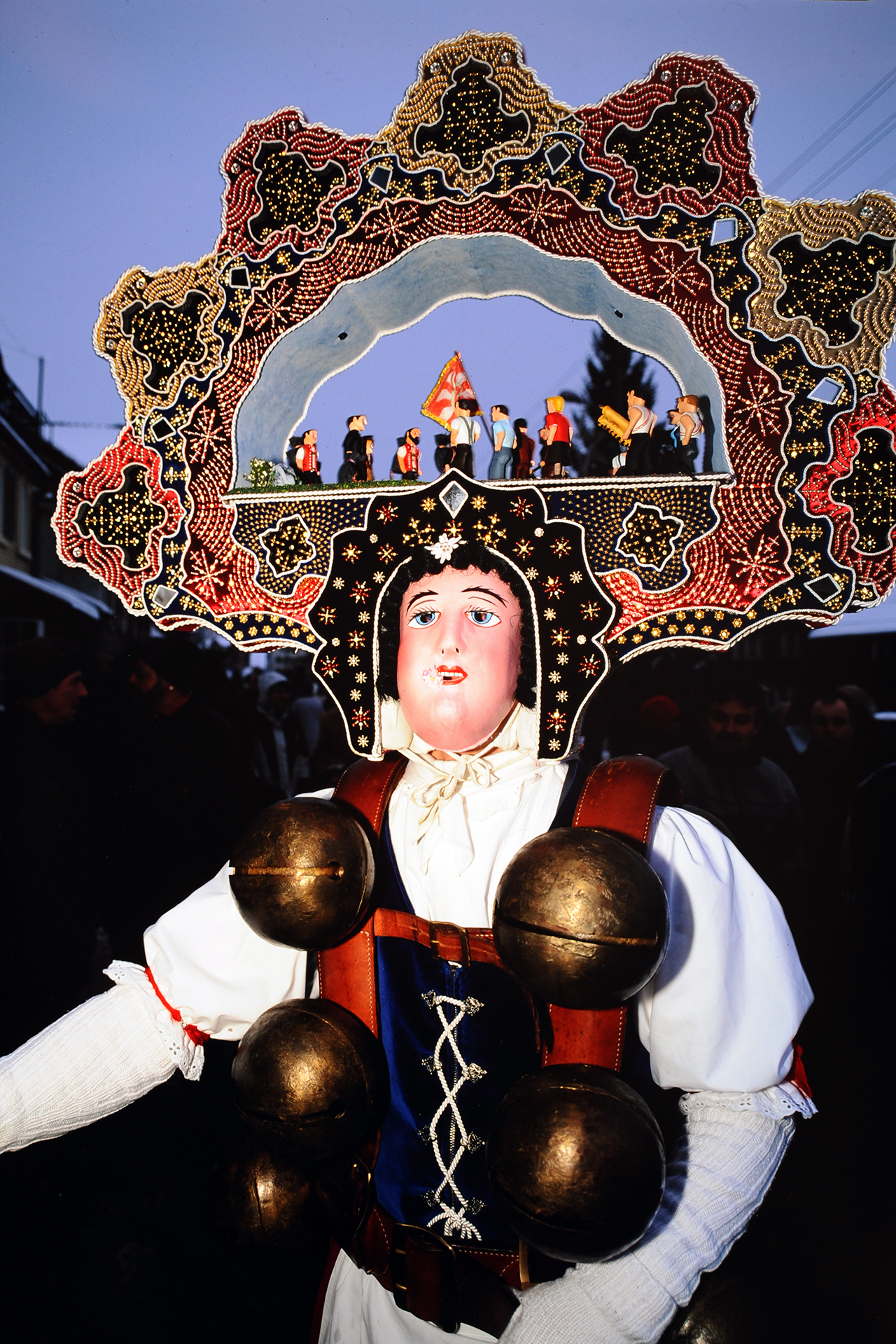
Silvesterklaus festival held in the village of Appenzell, Switzerland. January 2003.

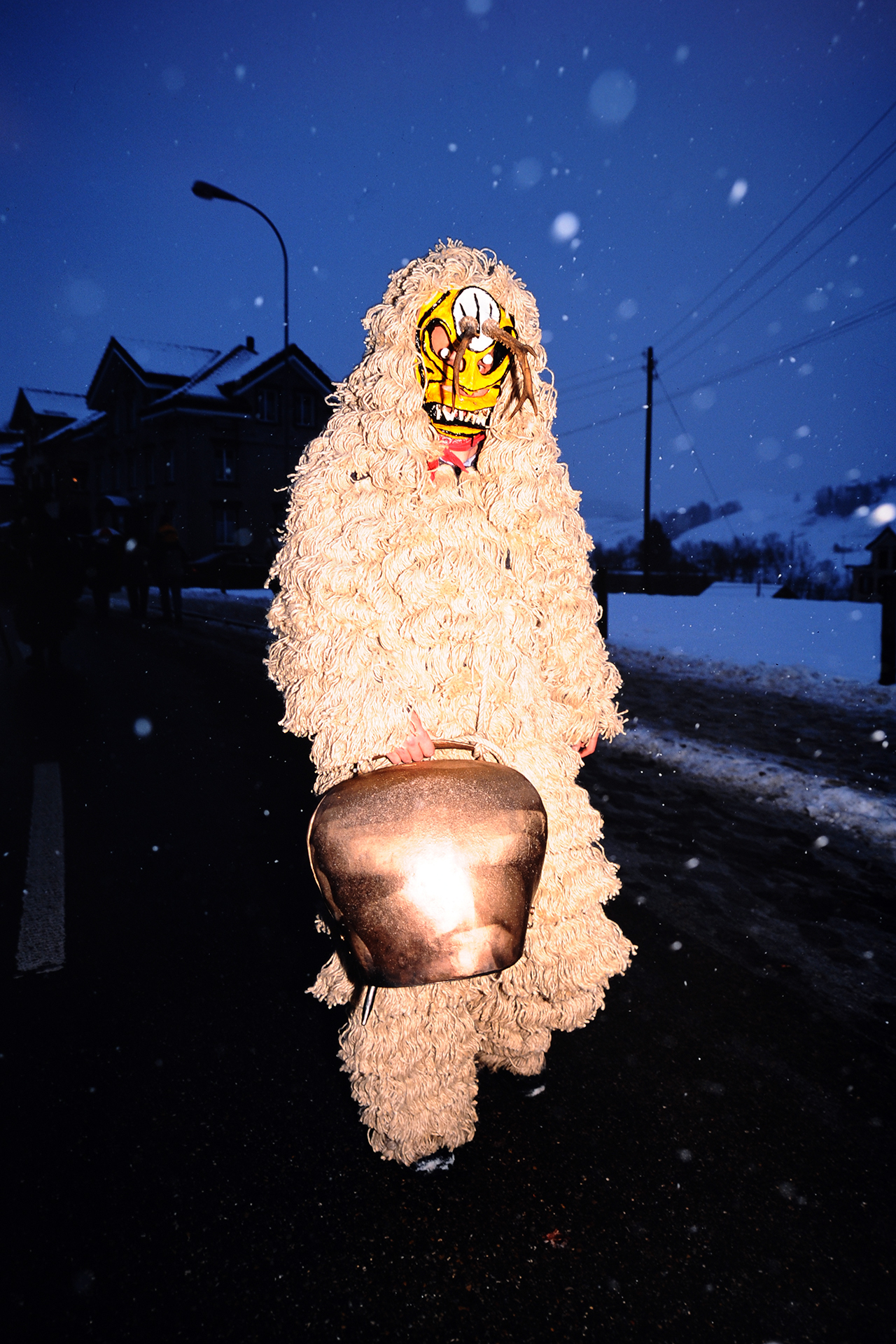
Silvesterklaus festival held in the village of Appenzell, Switzerland. January 2003.

Three different types of Silvesterchläuse can be distinguished. The Schöne (Beautiful), the Schö-Wüeschte (Pretty-Ugly) and the Wüeschte (Ugly).

- The Beautiful have very ornate embroidered headgear with scenes of peasant life, domestic customs and crafts, special buildings, sports, or family life, which take hundreds of hours of intensive work. Their dress resembles a local traditional costume.
- The Pretty-Ugly wear a costume made of fir twigs, ivy, moss, and other natural materials, and a headgear similar in shape to those of the Beautiful, but also decorated with natural materials.
- The Ugly wear a costume made from the same materials as the Pretty-Ugly, but coarser and more massive in appearance. On their head they wear a hat or a helmet, artfully crafted but having a wild appearance.

All characters hide their faces behind a mask, which is either sweet and doll-like (Beautiful), finely covered with natural materials (Pretty-Ugly), or scary looking (Ugly). The young people, in children's groups, are usually without a mask.

A fourth variant exists as Spasschläuse (Jokers), now getting rare. They represent a somewhat freer form of the tradition, and are usually dressed in a lighter costume, illustrating professional people (for instance farmers, forestry workers or cooks). They walk in smaller groups of 4 men and do not carry proper headgear, but only masks, kerchiefs or black pointed caps. These are former members, or yodelers, who want to keep up the tradition without the huge investment of time and energy needed for the production of the detailed costumes belonging to the main figures.

The characters represent either men or women, but in fact only men take part in the groups, due to the heavy costumes, the weight of the very large bells or the many jingle bells.

Every group plans its tour carefully in advance. A group consists of six people: two wear women's clothes and carry numerous jingle bells. The leading Klaus has a white flower in his mouth, his follower, a blue one. All the male figures carry one or two jingle bells on their chests and backs.

== Geographic distribution ==
This traditional Silvesterklausen is still alive throughout Appenzell Ausserrhoden, in the Appenzeller Hinterland, that is, in the communities of Urnäsch, Schwellbrunn, Schönengrund, Herisau, Waldstatt, Hundwil and Stein, and in the central municipality of Teufen. Isolated groups can also be seen in the localities of Buhler and Speicher.

Starting in 2022, a Schuppel was formed in New Glarus, Wisconsin to perform every January.

== See also ==
Find a large selection of varied, illustrative costumes at Commons

== Bibliography ==
- Regina Bendix, Theo Nef: Silvesterkläuse in Urnäsch. Verlagsgemeinschaft St. Gallen, 1984.
- Regina Bendix: Progress and Nostalgia. Silvesterklausen in Urnäsch, Switzerland. University of California Press, Berkeley CA 1985, ISBN 0-520-09959-1 (University of California publications – Folklore and mythology studies 33).
- Marcel Grubenmann, Lisa Tralci: Silvesterchlausen. Wo das Jahr zweimal beginnt. Appenzeller Verlag, Herisau 1999, ISBN 3-85882-245-0.
- Margit Thüler (Red.): Feste im Alpenraum. Schweiz, Österreich, Deutschland, Italien, Frankreich. Migros-Presse, Zürich 1997, ISBN 3-9521210-0-2, S. 49 (Buchgabe des Migros-Genossenschafts-Bundes 14).
- Appenzeller Magazin. Januar 2010, S. 8–19, ZDB-ID 2048536-0.
