= Hinterland, Switzerland =

Coordinates: 47.3457°N 9.2701°E

Hinterland District Bezirk Hinterland
- District
- Interactive map of Hinterland District
- Country: Switzerland
- Canton: Appenzell Ausserrhoden
- Capital: Herisau
- Municipalities: 7

Area
  - Total: 136 km^{2} (53 sq mi)

Population
  - Total: 24,758
- Time zone: UTC+1 (CET)
  - Summer (DST): UTC+2 (CEST)

Hinterland District is one of districts of the Canton of Appenzell Ausserrhoden, Switzerland. Like other districts of Appenzell Ausserrhoden, it does not serve any administrative function.

== Municipalities ==
Hinterland is divided into a total of 7 municipalities:

Coat of Arms	Municipality	Population (31 December 2020)	Area km^{2}
	Herisau	15,649	25.2
	Hundwil	968	24.08
	Schwellbrunn	1,550	17.42
	Schönengrund	528	5.19
	Stein	1,388	9.36
	Urnäsch	2,263	48.16
	Waldstatt	1,803	6.75
	Total	38,954	303.23
