= Municipalities of the canton of Uri =

There are 19 municipalities in the Canton of Uri in Switzerland.

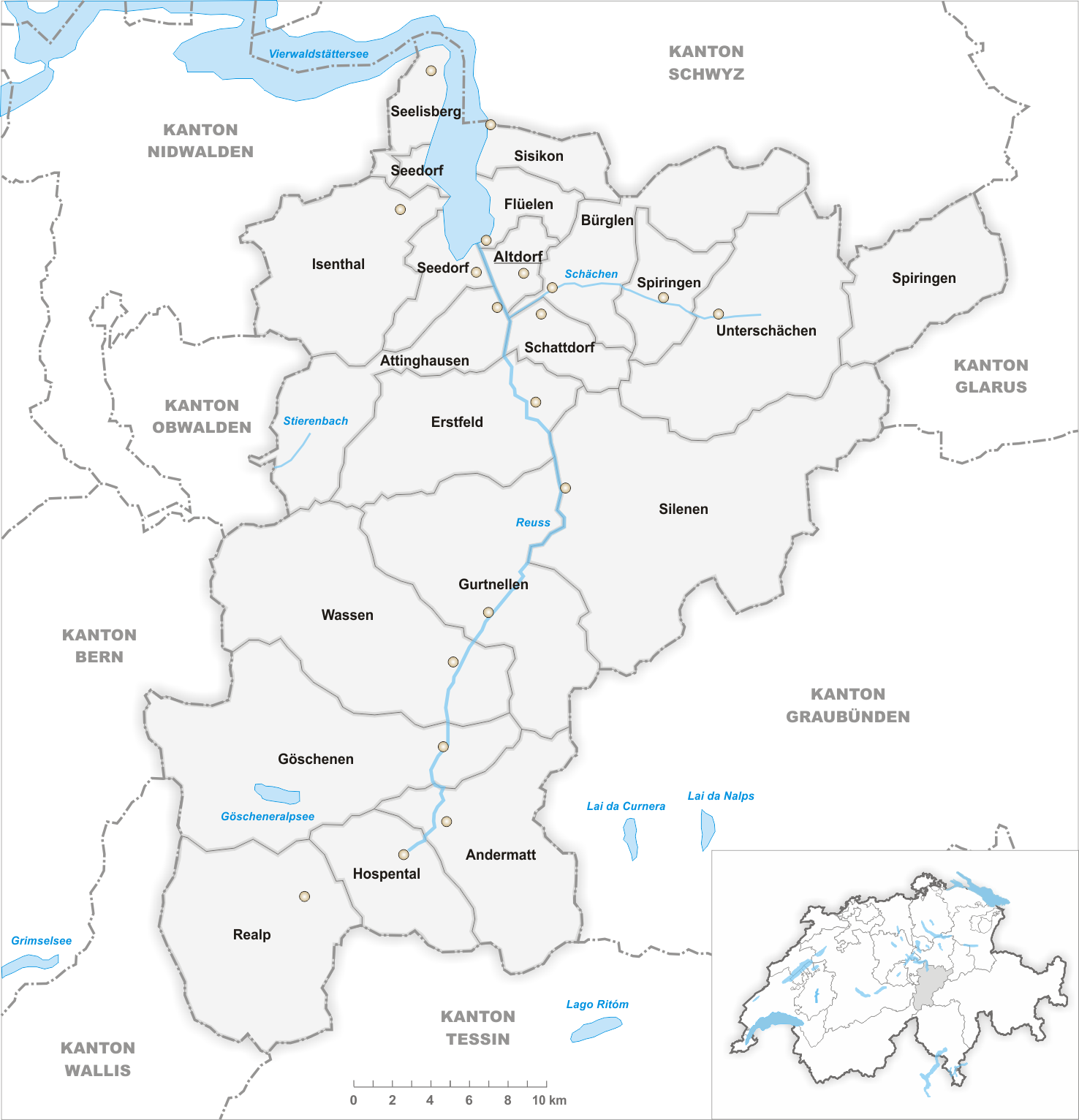
Municipalities in the canton of Uri (2021)

== Mergers of municipalities ==
The 19 municipalities of the Canton of Uri were mentioned in the cantonal constitution and any merger had to be approved by a cantonal referendum that would change the constitution accordingly. A referendum in 2013 approved with 57%, the removal of the names of the 19 municipalities from the constitution, thus allowing municipalities' mergers without the need of a cantonal referendum. The municipalities of Seedorf and Bauen were the first that voluntarily decided to merge. The merger took place on 1 January 2021, after approval by the population of both municipalities in a referendum in October 2019; the population of both Seedorf and Bauen voted in favor of the merger with 80% and 69% respectively

== List of the municipalities ==
| Coat of arms | Flag | Municipality | Population (31 December 2020) | Area in km^{2} | Inhabitants/ km^{2} |
|---|---|---|---|---|---|
| Altdorf | Altdorf | Altdorf | 9,565 | 10.23 | 935 |
| Andermatt | Andermatt | Andermatt | 1,527 | 62.2 | 25 |
| Attinghausen | Attinghausen | Attinghausen | 1,747 | 46.83 | 37 |
| Bürglen | Bürglen | Bürglen | 3,930 | 53.14 | 74 |
| Erstfeld | Erstfeld | Erstfeld | 3,861 | 59.2 | 65 |
| Flüelen | Flüelen | Flüelen | 2,025 | 12.42 | 163 |
| Göschenen | Göschenen | Göschenen | 428 | 10.431 | 41 |
| Gurtnellen | Gurtnellen | Gurtnellen | 512 | 83.35 | 6 |
| Hospental | Hospental | Hospental | 182 | 35.0 | 5 |
| Isenthal | Isenthal | Isenthal | 476 | 60.99 | 8 |
| Realp | Realp | Realp | 142 | 78.04 | 2 |
| Schattdorf | Schattdorf | Schattdorf | 5,408 | 16.31 | 332 |
| Seedorf | Seedorf | Seedorf | 1,876 | 19.42 | 97 |
| Seelisberg | Seelisberg | Seelisberg | 688 | 13.34 | 52 |
| Silenen | Silenen | Silenen | 1,951 | 144.78 | 13 |
| Sisikon | Sisikon | Sisikon | 383 | 16.29 | 24 |
| Spiringen | Spiringen | Spiringen | 842 | 64.73 | 13 |
| Unterschächen | Unterschächen | Unterschächen | 695 | 80.33 | 9 |
| Wassen | Wassen | Wassen | 412 | 96.89 | 4 |

== See also ==
- Municipalities of Switzerland
