= Schwellbrunn =

- Municipality
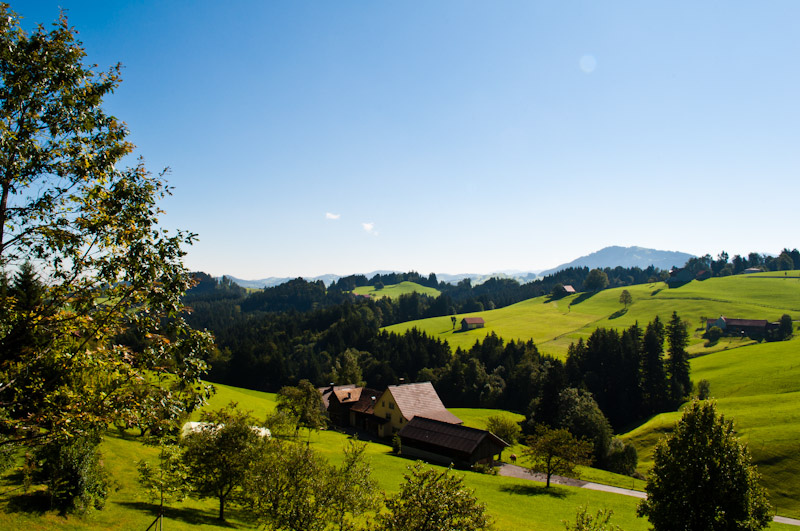
- Location of Schwellbrunn
- Location within Switzerland Location within Canton of Appenzell Ausserrhoden
- Coordinates: 47°21′N 9°15′E
- Country: Switzerland
- Canton: Appenzell Ausserrhoden
- District: n.a.

Area
  - Total: 17.39 km^{2} (6.71 sq mi)
- Elevation: 972 m (3,189 ft)

Population (December 2008)
  - Total: 1,475
  - Density: 84.82/km^{2} (219.7/sq mi)
- Time zone: UTC+01:00 (CET)
  - Summer (DST): UTC+02:00 (CEST)
- Postal code: 9103
- SFOS number: 3004
- ISO 3166 code: CH-AR
- Surrounded by: Degersheim (SG), Herisau, Mogelsberg (SG), Sankt Peterzell (SG), Schönengrund, Urnäsch, Waldstatt
- Website: www.schwellbrunn.ch

Schwellbrunn is a municipality in the canton of Appenzell Ausserrhoden in Switzerland.

== History ==
Schwellbrunn is first mentioned in 1268 as Schwellbrunnen.

== Geography ==
Schwellbrunn has an area, as of 2006, of 17.4 km^{2} (6.7 sq mi). Of this area, 61.5% is used for agricultural purposes, while 33.3% is forested. Of the rest of the land, 5.1% is settled (buildings or roads) and the remainder (0.1%) is non-productive (rivers, glaciers or mountains).

The municipality is located in the former District of Hinterland. It consists of the linear village of Schwellbrunn and a number of scattered farm houses. Schwellbrunn is the highest elevated village in the canton at 966 meters (3,169 ft). The village overviews mountains and the Lake Constance (Bodensee).

== Demographics ==
Schwellbrunn has a population (as of 2008) of 1,475, of which about 4.4% are foreign nationals. Over the last 10 years the population has decreased at a rate of -6.8%. Most of the population (as of 2000) speaks German (97.0%), with Albanian being second most common ( 1.0%) and Portuguese being third ( 0.7%).

As of 2000, the gender distribution of the population was 50.7% male and 49.3% female. The age distribution, as of 2000, in Schwellbrunn is; 147 people or 10.0% of the population are between 0–6 years old. 222 people or 15.1% are 6–15, and 87 people or 5.9% are 16–19. Of the adult population, 72 people or 4.9% of the population are between 20 and 24 years old. 419 people or 28.5% are 25–44, and 311 people or 21.2% are 45–64. The senior population distribution is 145 people or 9.9% of the population are between 65 and 79 years old, and 65 people or 4.4% are over 80.

In the 2007 federal election the FDP received 73.4% of the vote.

In Schwellbrunn about 68.9% of the population (between age 25–64) have completed either non-mandatory upper secondary education or additional higher education (either university or a Fachhochschule).

Schwellbrunn has an unemployment rate of 0.84%. As of 2005, there were 181 people employed in the primary economic sector and about 79 businesses involved in this sector. 65 people are employed in the secondary sector and there are 14 businesses in this sector. 159 people are employed in the tertiary sector, with 36 businesses in this sector.

The historical population is given in the following table:

Historical population
Year	Pop.	±%
1667	1,012	—
1794	2,436	+140.7%
1850	2,254	−7.5%
1900	1,888	−16.2%
1941	1,412	−25.2%
1950	1,515	+7.3%
1980	1,142	−24.6%
1990	1,438	+25.9%
2000	1,492	+3.8%
2005	1,455	−2.5%
2007	1,428	−1.9%

== Tourism ==
Agriculture and tourism are the main sources of income. The part of the village between the inns Harmonie and Kreuz was listed as a heritage site of national significance in 1995, but is not included in the newest list.

Aerial view from 500 m by Walter Mittelholzer (1920)

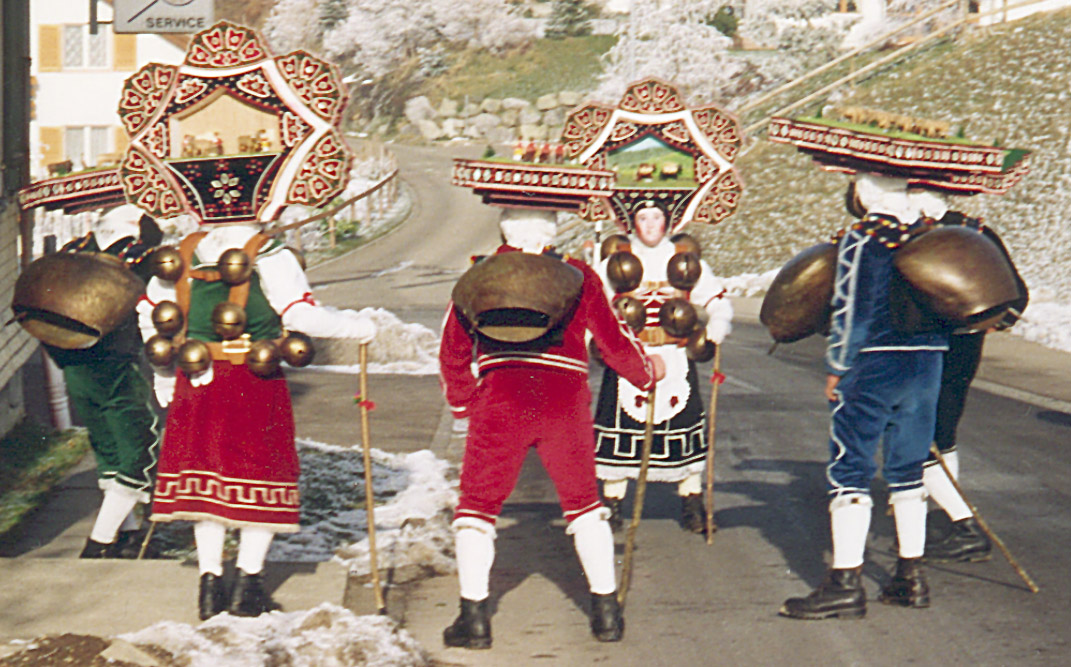
Silvesterklaus figures. Masked individuals that are part of an old Appenzell tradition that celebrates the New Year (both Julian and Gregorian.
