= Stein, Appenzell =

Stein
- Municipality
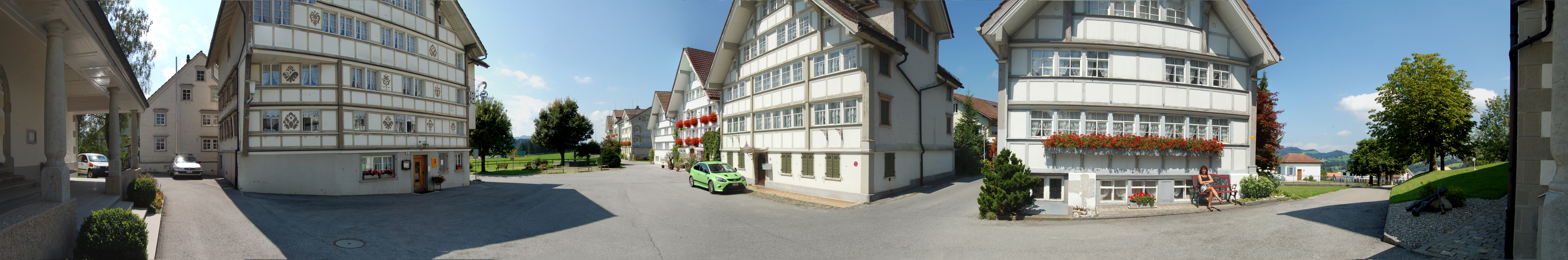

- Flag Coat of arms
- Location of Stein
- Location within Switzerland Location within Canton of Appenzell Ausserrhoden
- Coordinates: 47°22′N 9°21′E
- Country: Switzerland
- Canton: Appenzell Ausserrhoden
- District

Area
  - Total: 9.38 km^{2} (3.62 sq mi)
- Elevation: 827 m (2,713 ft)

Population (December 2008)
  - Total: 1,332
  - Density: 142/km^{2} (368/sq mi)
- Time zone: UTC+01:00 (CET)
  - Summer (DST): UTC+02:00 (CEST)
- Postal code: 9063
- SFOS number: 3005
- ISO 3166 code: CH-AR
- Surrounded by: Herisau, Hundwil, St. Gallen (SG), Schlatt-Haslen (AI), Teufen
- Website: www.stein-ar.ch

Stein (German pronunciation: [ʃtaɪn]) is a municipality in the canton of Appenzell Ausserrhoden in Switzerland.

== History ==
The municipality separated from Hundwil in 1749 and was named after the Uf Stein section of the neighbouring river.

== Geography ==
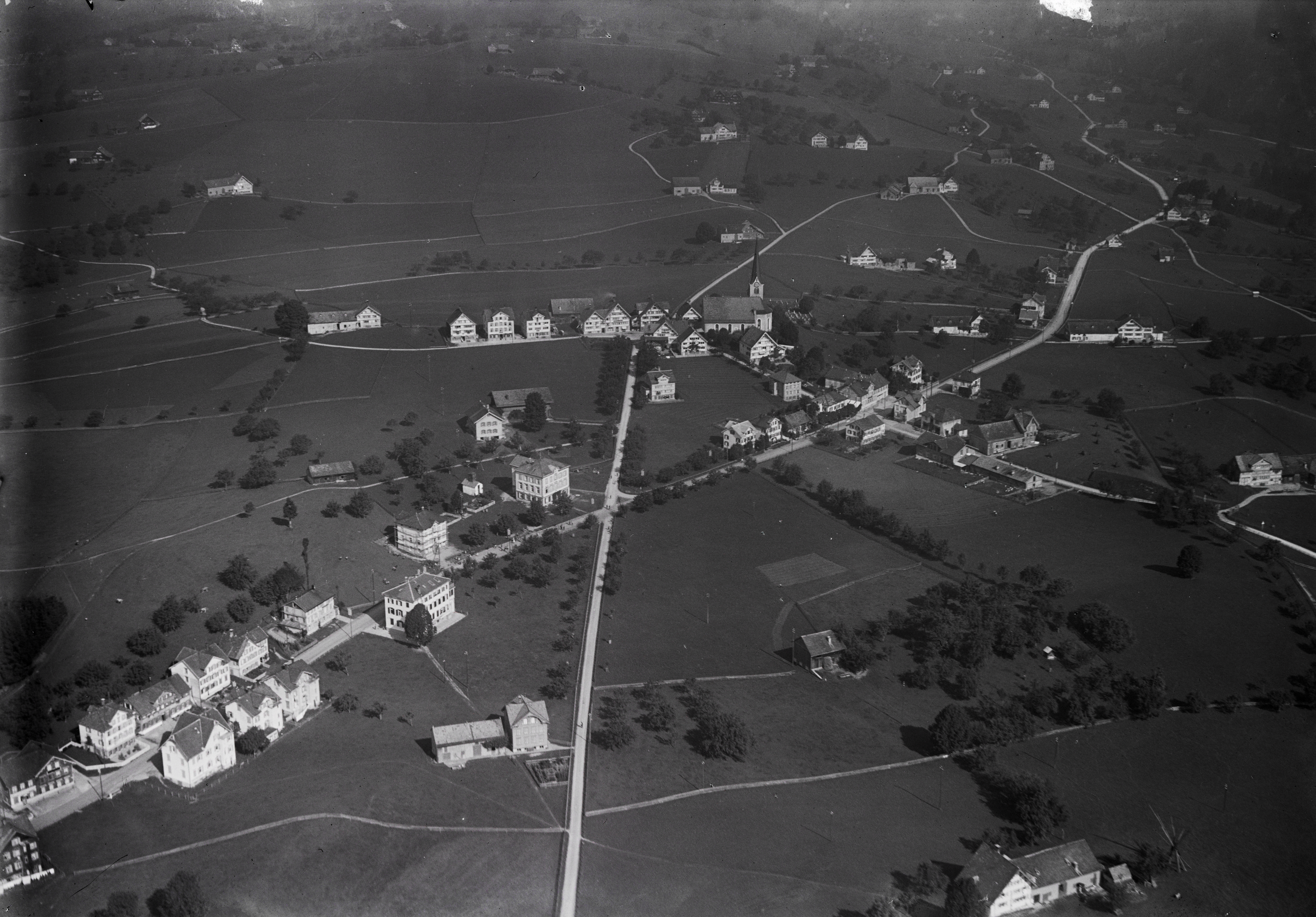
Aerial view from 300 m by Walter Mittelholzer (1923)

Stein has an area, as of 2006, of 9.4 km^{2} (3.6 sq mi). Of this area, 68.3% is used for agricultural purposes, while 22% is forested. Of the rest of the land, 8.3% is settled (buildings or roads) and the remainder (1.4%) is non-productive (rivers, glaciers or mountains).

== Demographics ==
Stein has a population (as of 2008) of 1,332, of which about 4.9% are foreign nationals. Over the last 10 years the population has decreased at a rate of -1.8%. Most of the population (as of 2000) speaks German (97.3%), with Spanish being second most common ( 0.5%) and Serbo-Croatian being third ( 0.4%).

As of 2000, the gender distribution of the population was 49.7% male and 50.3% female. The age distribution, as of 2000, in Stein is; 126 people or 9.3% of the population are between 0–6 years old. 182 people or 13.4% are 6–15, and 80 people or 5.9% are 16–19. Of the adult population, 67 people or 4.9% of the population are between 20 and 24 years old. 383 people or 28.3% are 25–44, and 313 people or 23.1% are 45–64. The senior population distribution is 161 people or 11.9% of the population are between 65 and 79 years old, and 43 people or 3.2% are over 80.

In the 2007 federal election the FDP received 71.4% of the vote.

In Stein about 75% of the population (between age 25 and 64) have completed either non-mandatory upper secondary education or additional higher education (either university or a Fachhochschule).

Stein has an unemployment rate of 0.73%. As of 2005, there were 119 people employed in the primary economic sector and about 51 businesses involved in this sector. 77 people are employed in the secondary sector and there are 21 businesses in this sector. 186 people are employed in the tertiary sector, with 42 businesses in this sector.

The historical population is given in the following table:

Historical population
Year	Pop.	±%
1980	1,198	—
1990	1,314	+9.7%
2000	1,371	+4.3%
2005	1,330	−3.0%
2007	1,336	+0.5%

== Sights ==
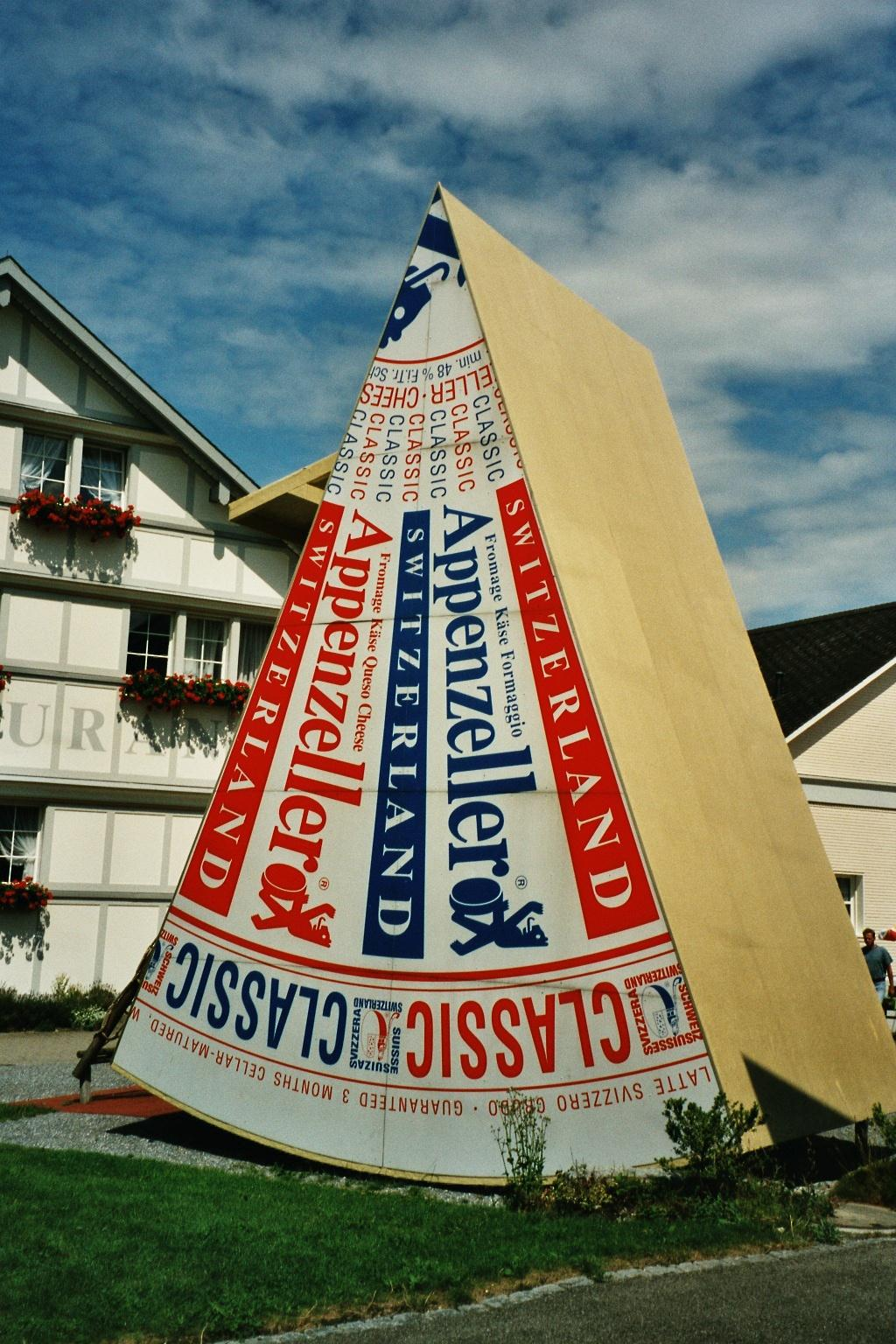
Giant cheese slice outside the Stein show dairy (Schaukäserei)

Stein is home to the Appenzell Folklore Museum, which is listed as a heritage site of national significance. The museum is devoted to Appenzell culture and handicrafts such as beltmaking, cowbells and carpentry. There is also an extensive display of traditional folk art, such as furniture decorated with scenes from daily scenes. The most prolific of these uncelebrated artists is Johannes Müller who also worked as a clockmaker.

Stein is also home to a show dairy. The various processes of cheesemaking can be watched from a gallery above the churns and vats.

The village center was built in the 18th century and includes the village church. The church was built in 1749 by Jakob and Hans Ulrich Grubenmann, and renovated in 1832/1833 by Gebhard Moosbrugger.

Between the hamlet of Störgel and the Haggen section of St. Gallen, is the highest foot bridge in Europe. The Ganggelibrugg (wacky bridge) stretches over the 355 m (1,165 ft) wide Sitter river canyon and is 99 m (325 ft) above the river. It was completed in 1937. This bridge is the most used bridge in Switzerland for suicide.

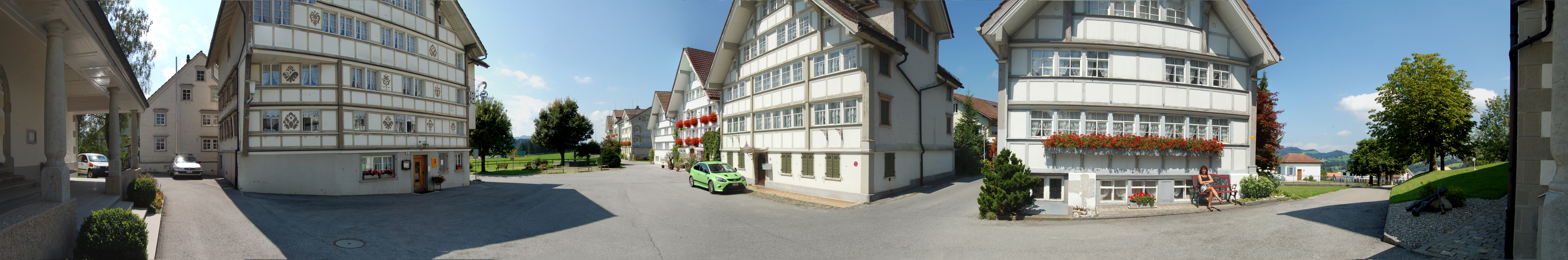
Village square in Stein with the church in the back.

=== Heritage sites of national significance ===
The Appenzeller Volkskunde-Museum, Eisensteg Zweibruggen (shared with St Gallen), Gmündertobel Bridge (with Teufen), Urnäschbrücke im Kubel (bridge shared with Herisau) and the Wattbach Bridge (shared with Teufen and St Gallen) are listed as heritage sites of national significance.
