= Waldstatt =

- Municipality
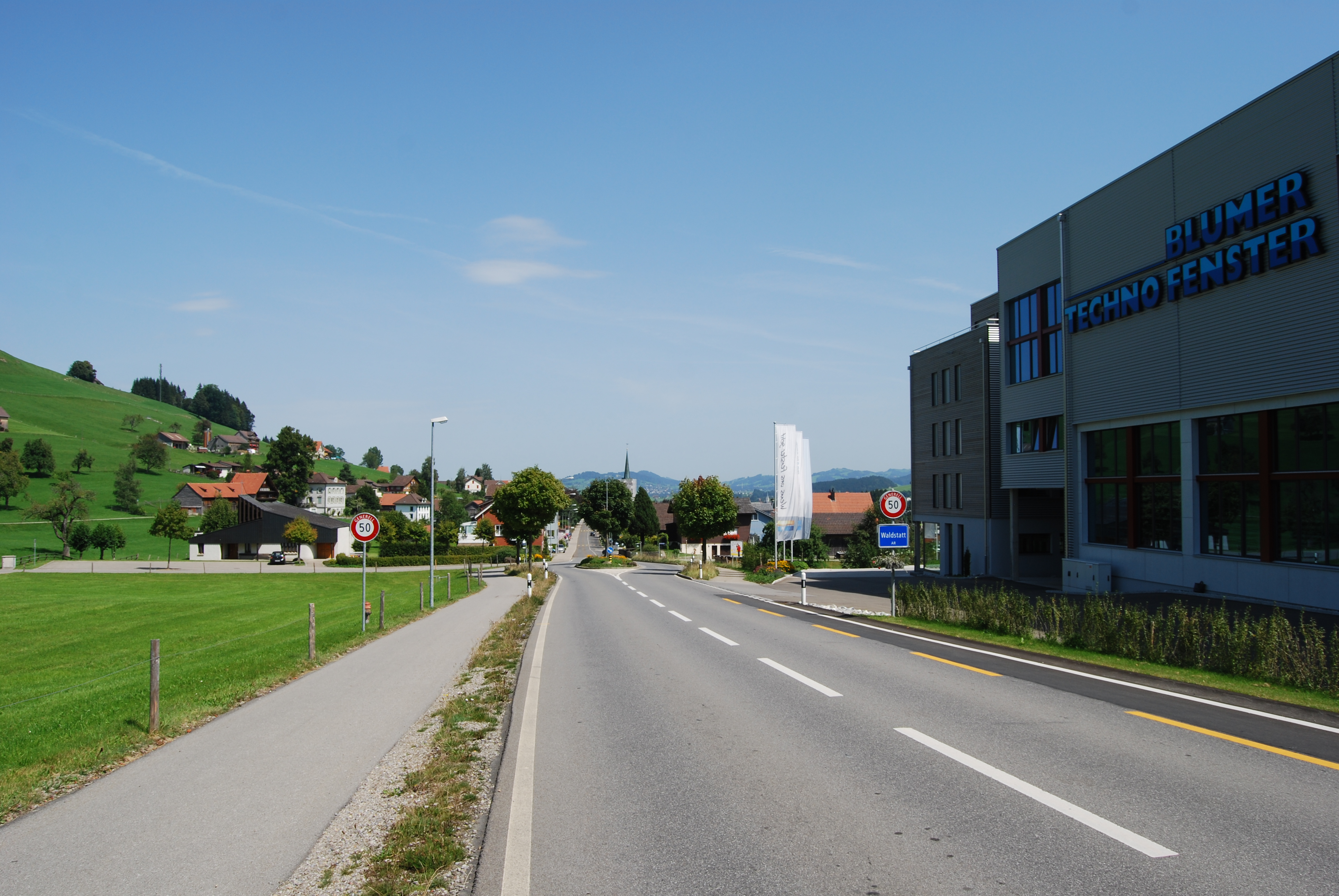

- Flag Coat of arms
- Location of Waldstatt
- Location within Switzerland Location within Canton of Appenzell Ausserrhoden
- Coordinates: 47°21′N 9°17′E
- Country: Switzerland
- Canton: Appenzell Ausserrhoden
- District: n.a.

Area
  - Total: 6.74 km^{2} (2.60 sq mi)
- Elevation: 816 m (2,677 ft)

Population (December 2008)
  - Total: 1,755
  - Density: 260/km^{2} (674/sq mi)
- Time zone: UTC+01:00 (CET)
  - Summer (DST): UTC+02:00 (CEST)
- Postal code: 9104
- SFOS number: 3007
- ISO 3166 code: CH-AR
- Surrounded by: Herisau, Hundwil, Schwellbrunn, Urnäsch
- Website: www.waldstatt.ch

Waldstatt is a municipality in the canton of Appenzell Ausserrhoden in Switzerland.

== History ==
Aerial view from 500 m by Walter Mittelholzer (1923)

Waldstatt is first mentioned in 1374 as Ober Walstatt. In 1415 it was mentioned as Wallstatt.

== Geography ==
Waldstatt has an area, as of 2006, of 6.7 km^{2} (2.6 sq mi). Of this area, 62.1% is used for agricultural purposes, while 25.9% is forested. Of the rest of the land, 10.6% is settled (buildings or roads) and the remainder (1.3%) is non-productive (rivers, glaciers or mountains).

The municipality is located in the former District of Hinterland. It consists of the village of Waldstatt and a number of hamlets and farm houses. It is located about two miles south of Herisau.

== Demographics ==
Waldstatt has a population (as of 2008) of 1,755, of which about 11.5% are foreign nationals. Over the last 10 years the population has grown at a rate of 1.9%. Most of the population (as of 2000) speaks German (90.9%), with Turkish being second most common ( 2.8%) and Serbo-Croatian being third ( 1.6%).

As of 2000, the gender distribution of the population was 50.2% male and 49.8% female. The age distribution, as of 2000, in Waldstatt is; 157 people or 9.2% of the population are between 0–6 years old. 218 people or 12.7% are 6-15, and 93 people or 5.4% are 16–19. Of the adult population, 101 people or 5.9% of the population are between 20 and 24 years old. 465 people or 27.2% are 25–44, and 405 people or 23.7% are 45–64. The senior population distribution is 191 people or 11.2% of the population are between 65 and 79 years old, and 80 people or 4.7% are over 80.

In the 2007 federal election the FDP received 71.5% of the vote.

In Waldstatt about 68.6% of the population (between age 25–64) have completed either non-mandatory upper secondary education or additional higher education (either university or a Fachhochschule).

Waldstatt has an unemployment rate of 1.33%. As of 2005, there were 78 people employed in the primary economic sector and about 38 businesses involved in this sector. 304 people are employed in the secondary sector and there are 19 businesses in this sector. 202 people are employed in the tertiary sector, with 54 businesses in this sector.

The historical population is given in the following table:

Historical population
Year	Pop.	±%
1734	634	—
1800	1,034	+63.1%
1850	983	−4.9%
1870	951	−3.3%
1900	1,483	+55.9%
1910	1,555	+4.9%
1941	1,297	−16.6%
1950	1,455	+12.2%
1960	1,536	+5.6%
1980	1,440	−6.2%
1990	1,529	+6.2%
2000	1,713	+12.0%
2005	1,720	+0.4%
2007	1,747	+1.6%

== Transport ==
The municipality has a railway station, Waldstatt, on the Gossau–Wasserauen line.
