= Urnäsch =

- Municipality
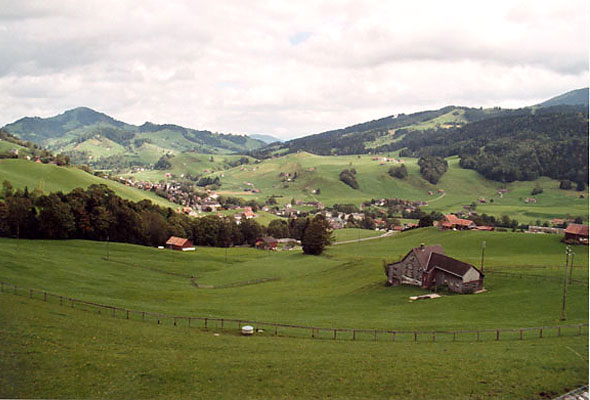

- Coat of arms
- Location of Urnäsch
- Location within Switzerland Location within Canton of Appenzell Ausserrhoden
- Coordinates: 47°19′N 9°17′E
- Country: Switzerland
- Canton: Appenzell Ausserrhoden
- District: n.a.

Area
  - Total: 48.23 km^{2} (18.62 sq mi)
- Elevation: 826 m (2,710 ft)

Population (December 2008)
  - Total: 2,268
  - Density: 47.02/km^{2} (121.8/sq mi)
- Time zone: UTC+01:00 (CET)
  - Summer (DST): UTC+02:00 (CEST)
- Postal code: 9107
- SFOS number: 3006
- ISO 3166 code: CH-AR
- Surrounded by: Hemberg (SG), Hundwil, Nesslau-Krummenau (SG), Schönengrund, Schwellbrunn, Waldstatt
- Website: www.urnaesch.ch

Urnäsch is a municipality in the canton of Appenzell Ausserrhoden, Switzerland.

== History ==
Aerial view from 200 m by Walter Mittelholzer (1922)

In 831 AD a part of Urnäsch known as Färchen was first mentioned. In the 10th century, Urnäsch was part of the administrative district Herisau. From the 14th century onwards, Urnäsch was part of the Rhode Hundwil, and thus part of the bailiwick of St. Gallen. The first official mentioning of the municipality's entirety as “Urnäschen” occurred in 1344, when the village was sold to the German Earl Werdenberg, although the municipality already had a strong and independent agenda. It became part of the Schwäbischer Städtebund in the same year as the so-called Lendlyn, which further reaffirmed their independent position. In 1401, Urnäsch joined the Bund together with St. Gallen. At that time, Urnäsch was still a part of the Rhode Hundwil. From 1401 to 1429, Urnäsch was on the forefront of the Appenzell wars. After the battles in Vögelinsegg (1403) and Stoss (1405) the land gained independence as part of Appenzell.

Until 1414, Urnäsch’s population had to go to church in the faraway municipality of Herisau. In the same year, a new church was built in Urnäsch, and thereby the municipality obtained its independence in 1417 when the church was inaugurated. In 1480, Hundwil and Urnäsch split. In 1525, Urnäsch joined the Reformation. Since the Landteilung in 1597, Urnäsch has been part of Appenzell Ausserrhoden as one of the six outermost Rhoden and was regularly the meeting place of the Kleiner Rat.

In 1641, a large fire broke out in the village and burned down the church, the guildhall, the presbytery, and many other residential buildings. The church was rebuilt shortly thereafter and renovated between 1866 and 1888.

Until 1722, the municipality Schönengrund was also part of Urnäsch, but obtained its independence the same year. Since then, the territory of Urnäsch has remained unaltered.

Since the second half of the 19th century, the separation of church and state became more common, until the Swiss constitution of 1908 declared them to be fully separated from each other. Interestingly, Urnäsch's constitution only removed the term “Kirchhöri” as its description, which includes both church and government, in the year 2000.

From the 1850s onwards, tourism began to gain importance as a source of income. In 1853, the municipality’s first bridge was inaugurated, and in 1875 a first train stop was built. In the 20th century, the establishment of public transport connections were of significance.

== Geography ==
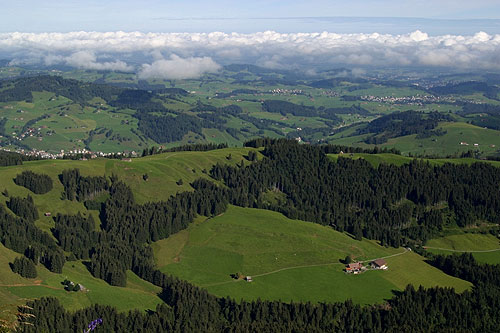
View from the Kronberg over Urnäsch and Hundwil.

Urnäsch has an area, as of 2006, of 48.3 km^{2} (18.6 sq mi). Of this area, 53.9% is used for agricultural purposes, while 41.1% is forested. Of the rest of the land, 3.4% is settled (buildings or roads) and the remainder (1.7%) is non-productive (rivers, glaciers or mountains).

The elevation of the village is 838 meters (2,749 ft). The lowest elevation is the Murbach which is 722 m (2,369 ft), while the highest point is the Petersalp which is 1,590 m (5,220 ft).

== Demographics ==
Urnäsch has a population (as of 2008) of 2,268, of which about 11.6% are foreign nationals. Over the last 10 years the population has decreased at a rate of -3%. Most of the population (as of 2000) speaks German (93.0%), with Serbo-Croatian being second most common ( 2.3%) and Italian being third ( 1.0%). As of 2000, the gender distribution of the population was 50.6% male and 49.4% female. The age distribution, as of 2000, in Urnäsch is; 216 people or 9.2% of the population are between 0–6 years old. 316 people or 13.5% are 6-15, and 121 people or 5.2% are 16–19. Of the adult population, 143 people or 6.1% of the population are between 20–24 years old. 651 people or 27.9% are 25–44, and 495 people or 21.2% are 45–64. The senior population distribution is 276 people or 11.8% of the population are between 65–79 years old, and 118 people or 5.1% are over 80.

In the 2007 federal election the FDP received 70.6% of the vote.

In Urnäsch about 57.4% of the population (between age 25-64) have completed either non-mandatory upper secondary education or additional higher education (either university or a Fachhochschule).

The historical population is given in the following table:

Historical population
Year	Pop.	±%
1850	2,464	—
1870	2,564	+4.1%
1888	3,123	+21.8%
1900	3,087	−1.2%
1920	3,202	+3.7%
1941	2,481	−22.5%
1960	2,330	−6.1%
1980	2,258	−3.1%
2000	2,322	+2.8%
2010	2,278	−1.9%
2020	2,263	−0.7%
2022	2,290	+1.2%

== Weather ==
Urnäsch has an average of 161.6 days of rain per year and on average receives 1,803 mm (71.0 in) of precipitation. The wettest month is June during which time Urnäsch receives an average of 210 mm (8.3 in) of precipitation. During this month there is precipitation for an average of 15.5 days. The month with the most days of precipitation is May, with an average of 15.8, but with only 177 mm (7.0 in) of precipitation. The driest month of the year is October with an average of 107 mm (4.2 in) of precipitation over 15.5 days.

== Economy ==
Urnäsch has an unemployment rate of 1.33%. As of 2005, there were 215 people employed in the primary economic sector and about 96 businesses involved in this sector. 246 people are employed in the secondary sector and there are 28 businesses in this sector. 496 people are employed in the tertiary sector, with 79 businesses in this sector. There are just under 100 farms and 18 hotels and restaurants in the village.

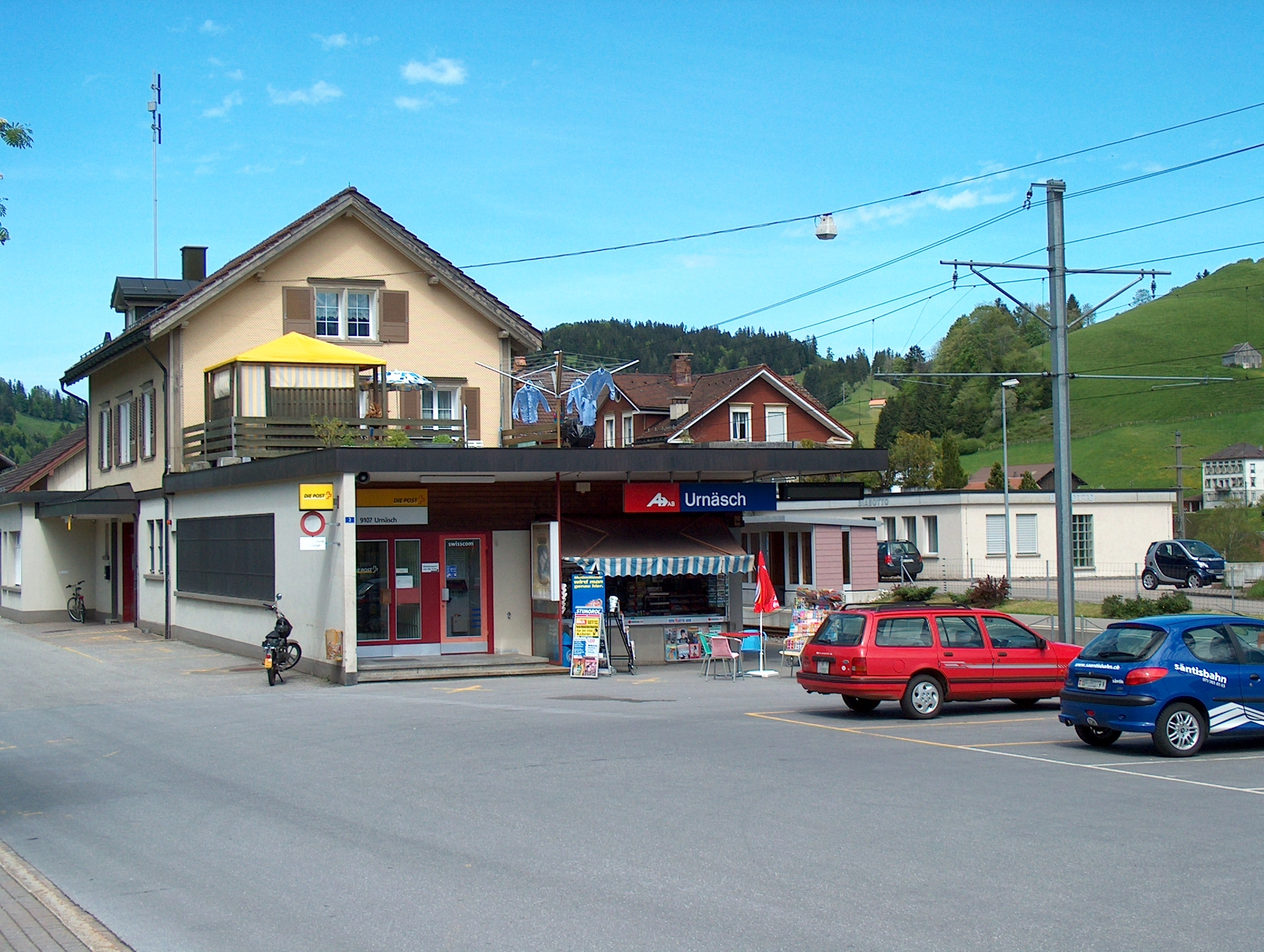
Train station and post office of Urnäsch

== Transport ==
The municipality has two railway stations, Urnäsch and Zürchersmühle, on the Gossau–Wasserauen line of Appenzell Railways.

== Heritage sites of national significance ==
The Museum für Appenzeller Brauchtum and the Mill House along with the Mill are listed as heritage sites of national significance.
