= Schönengrund =

- Municipality
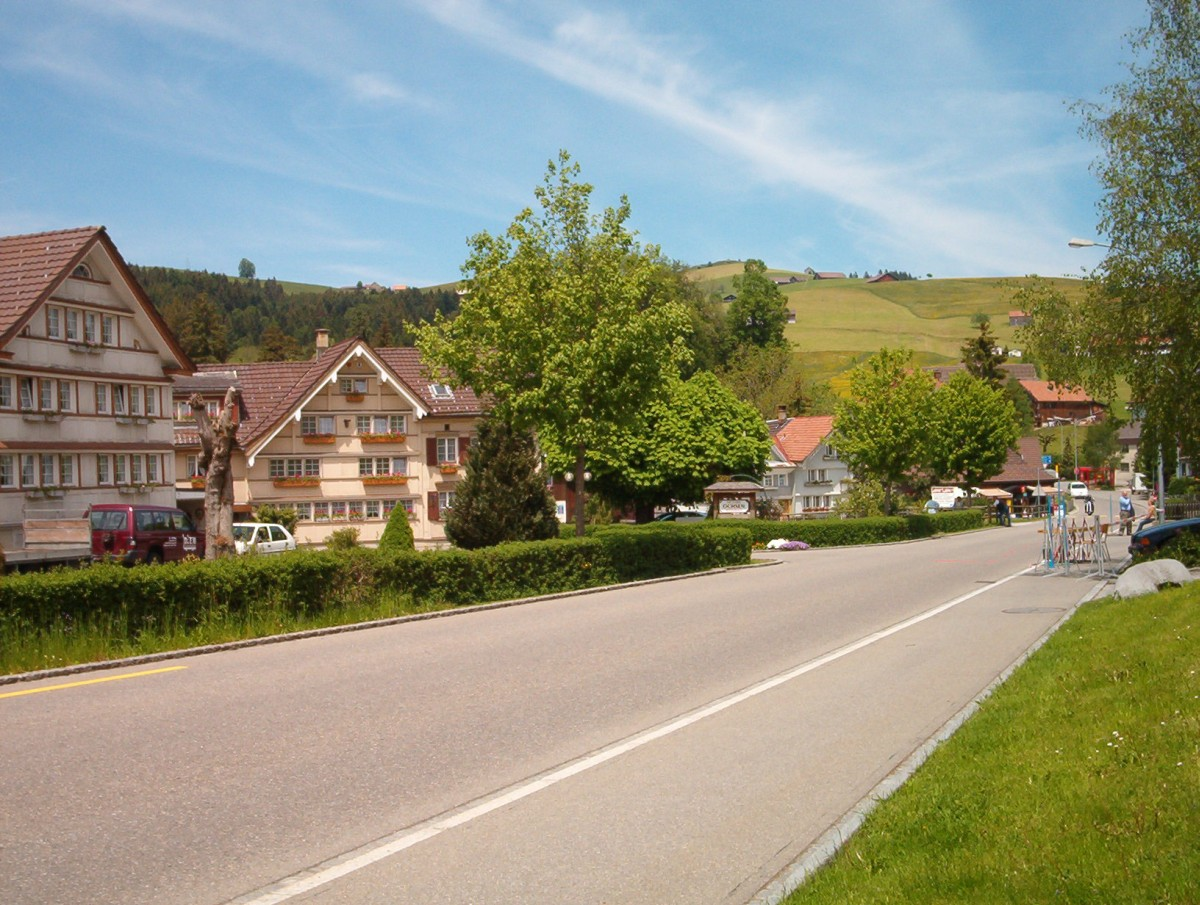

- Flag Coat of arms
- Location of Schönengrund
- Location within Switzerland Location within Canton of Appenzell Ausserrhoden
- Coordinates: 47°19′N 9°13′E
- Country: Switzerland
- Canton: Appenzell Ausserrhoden
- District: n.a.

Area
  - Total: 5.19 km^{2} (2.00 sq mi)
- Elevation: 844 m (2,769 ft)

Population (December 2008)
  - Total: 488
  - Density: 94.0/km^{2} (244/sq mi)
- Time zone: UTC+01:00 (CET)
  - Summer (DST): UTC+02:00 (CEST)
- Postal code: 9105
- SFOS number: 3003
- ISO 3166 code: CH-AR
- Surrounded by: Hemberg (SG), Sankt Peterzell (SG), Schwellbrunn, Urnäsch
- Website: www.schoenengrund.ch

Schönengrund is a municipality in the canton of Appenzell Ausserrhoden in Switzerland.

== Geography ==
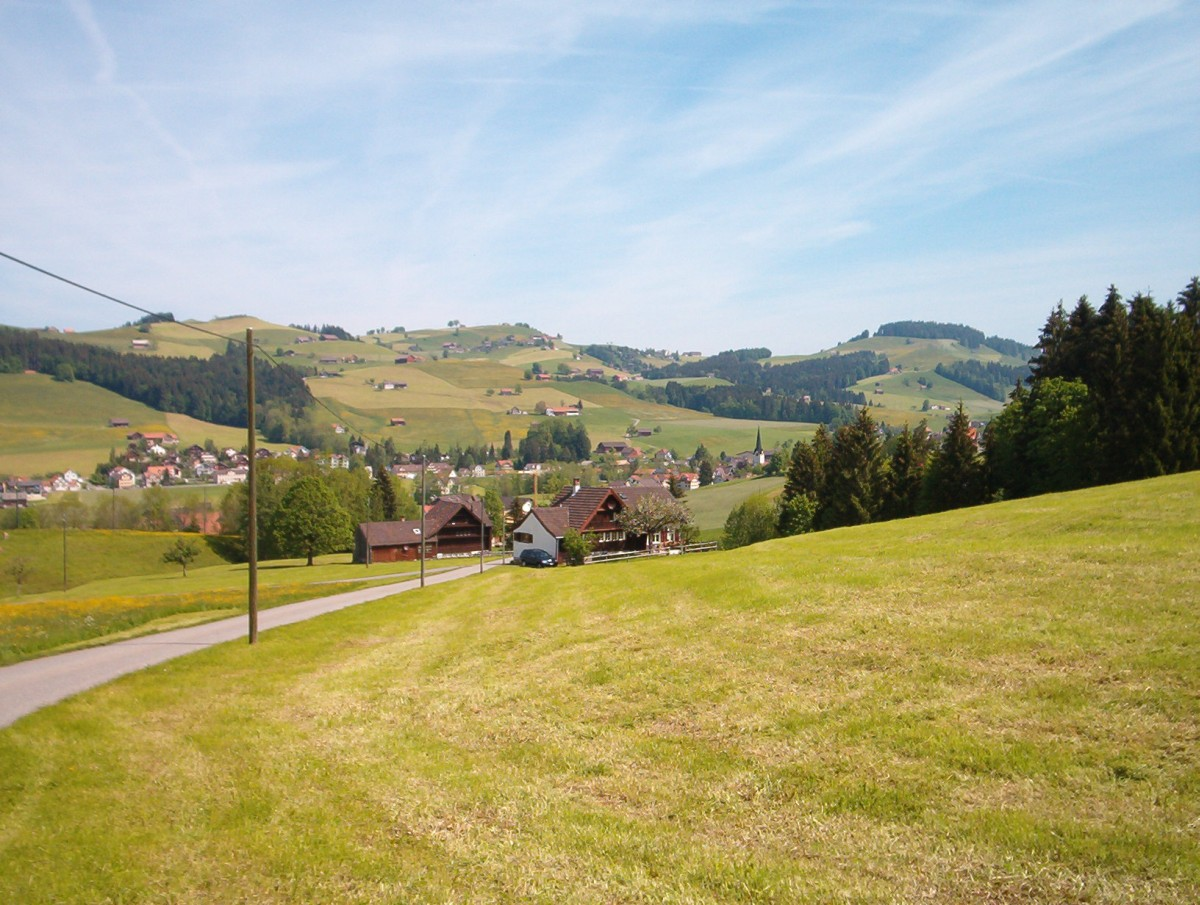
Schönengrund seen from the side of Hochhamm mountain (not pictured), May 2004.

Aerial view from 100 m by Walter Mittelholzer (1920)

Schönengrund has an area, as of 2006, of 5.2 km^{2} (2.0 sq mi). Of this area, 65.5% is used for agricultural purposes, while 30.1% is forested. The rest of the land, (4.4%) is settled.

== Demographics ==
Schönengrund has a population (as of 2008) of 488, of which about 3.4% are foreign nationals. Over the last 10 years the population has decreased at a rate of -0.6%. Most of the population (as of 2000) speaks German (97.8%), with Serbo-Croatian being second most common ( 0.9%) and Spanish being third ( 0.4%).

As of 2000, the gender distribution of the population was 50.8% male and 49.2% female. The age distribution, as of 2000, in Schönengrund is; 45 people or 9.8% of the population are between 0–6 years old. 73 people or 15.9% are 6-15, and 23 people or 5.0% are 16-19. Of the adult population, 21 people or 4.6% of the population are between 20–24 years old. 130 people or 28.3% are 25-44, and 108 people or 23.5% are 45-64. The senior population distribution is 46 people or 10.0% of the population are between 65–79 years old, and 13 people or 2.8% are over 80.

In the 2007 federal election the FDP received 77.9% of the vote.

In Schönengrund about 70.1% of the population (between age 25-64) have completed either non-mandatory upper secondary education or additional higher education (either university or a Fachhochschule).

Schönengrund has an unemployment rate of 1.35%. As of 2005, there were 57 people employed in the primary economic sector and about 28 businesses involved in this sector. 20 people are employed in the secondary sector and there are 7 businesses in this sector. 49 people are employed in the tertiary sector, with 17 businesses in this sector.

The historical population is given in the following table:

Historical population
Year	Pop.	±%
1980	404	—
1990	434	+7.4%
2000	459	+5.8%
2005	471	+2.6%
2007	469	−0.4%

== Tourism ==
Schönengrund attracts tourists both during the winter and summer. During winter downhill skiing, snowboarding and cross-country skiing are offered. During the summer, hiking attracts tourists.
