= St. Gallen Marktplatz railway station =

Train station in the city of St. Gallen, Switzerland

St. Gallen Marktplatz
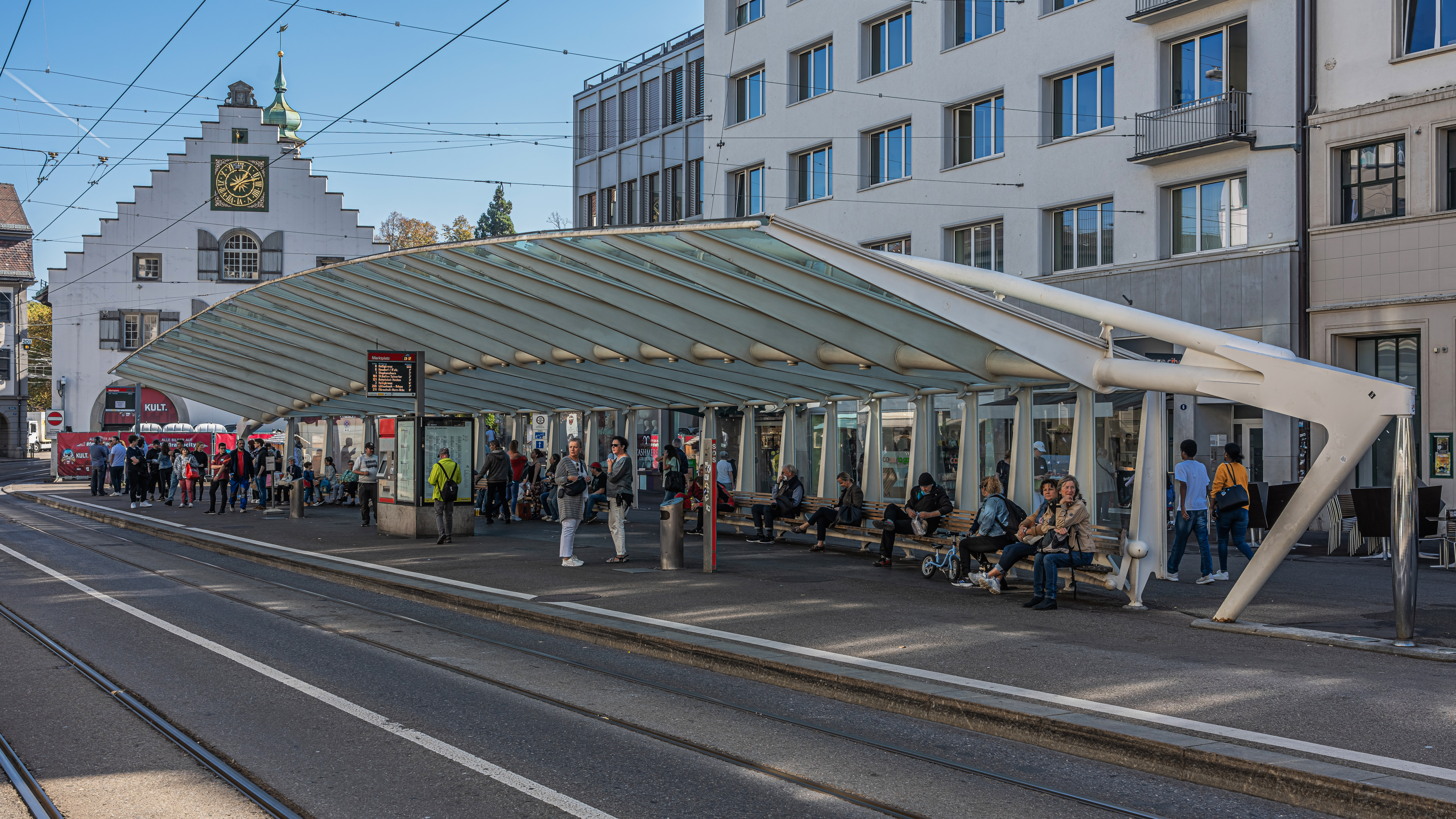
- Pictured in 2022

General information
- Other names: Marktplatz / Bohl
- Location: City of St. Gallen; Canton of St. Gallen, Switzerland
- Coordinates: 47°25′34″N 9°22′34″E
- Elevation: 667 m (2,188 ft)
- Lines: Appenzell–St. Gallen–Trogen railway; (St. Gallen–Trogen railway until 2018)
- Platforms: 2 (street-level boarding)
- Tracks: 2
- Train operators: Appenzell Railways
- Connections
- Trolleybus: VBSG trolleybus routes 1 3 4
- Bus: VBSG bus routes 2 6 7 8 11 PostAuto bus routes 120 121 200 201 210 211 242 Regiobus bus route 151

Other information
- Fare zone: 210 (Tarifverbund Ostwind)

Services
Preceding station	St. Gallen S-Bahn	Following station
St. Gallen towards Appenzell	S20	St. Gallen Spisertor towards Trogen
St. Gallen towards Appenzell	S21	St. Gallen Spisertor towards Trogen
St. Gallen towards Teufen AR	S22	St. Gallen Spisertor towards Trogen
Location
- Location within Switzerland Location within Canton of St. Gallen

St. Gallen Marktplatz station, also called Marktplatz/Bohl, is a railway station in the city of St. Gallen, in the canton of St. Gallen, Switzerland. It is located on the 1,000 mm (3 ft 3 3/8 in) Appenzell–St. Gallen–Trogen line of Appenzell Railways (Appenzeller Bahnen, AB), and is served by local light rail trains only. The station is also a bus stop for local and regional buses.

== Services ==
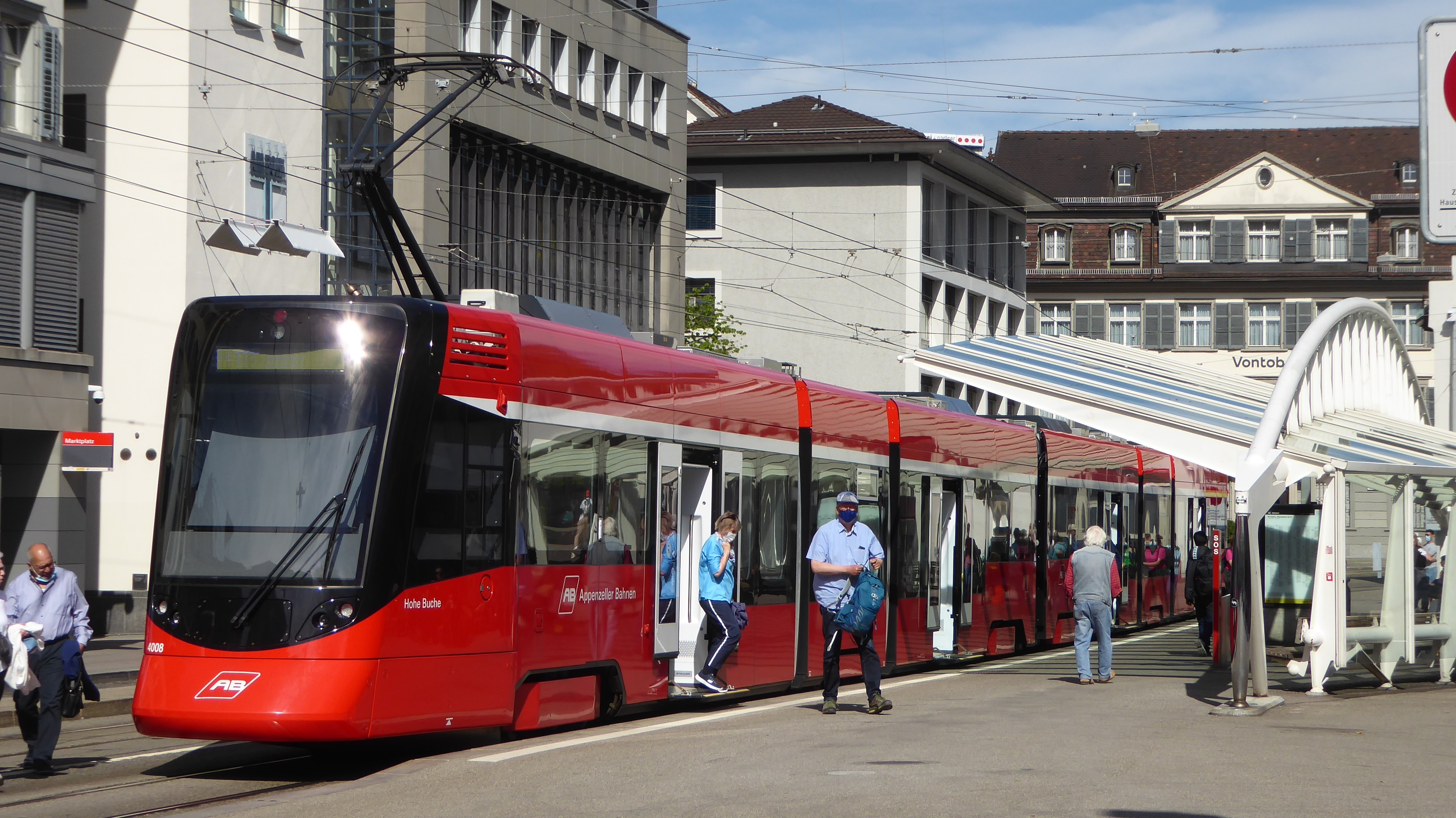
Tango light rail of Appenzell Railways at the station in 2021

The station is served by S-Bahn trains and several local and regional bus routes.

=== S-Bahn ===
As of the December 2024 timetable change, the following services stop at the station (stop only on request):

- St. Gallen S-Bahn:
  - S20: rush-hour service between Appenzell and Trogen, via St. Gallen (only calls at Niederteufen, Teufen AR and Bühler between St. Gallen and Gais).
  - S21: half-hourly service between Appenzell and Trogen, via St. Gallen.
  - S22: rush-hour service between Teufen AR and Trogen, via St. Gallen.

=== Bus ===
The station is served by trolleybuses and motor buses of Verkehrsbetriebe St. Gallen (VBSG), and regional buses of PostAuto, and Regiobus.

== See also ==
- Rail transport in Switzerland
