= Vögelinsegg railway station =

Train station in the city of St. Gallen, Switzerland

Vögelinsegg

General information
- Location: Speicher; Canton of Appenzell Ausserrhoden, Switzerland
- Coordinates: 47°24′58″N 9°26′10″E
- Elevation: 940 m (3,080 ft)
- Lines: Appenzell–St. Gallen–Trogen railway; (St. Gallen–Trogen railway until 2018)
- Platforms: 2 side platforms
- Tracks: 2
- Train operators: Appenzell Railways

Other information
- Fare zone: 245 (Tarifverbund Ostwind)

Services
Preceding station	St. Gallen S-Bahn	Following station
Schwarzer Bären towards Appenzell	S20	Schützengarten towards Trogen
Schwarzer Bären towards Appenzell	S21	Schützengarten towards Trogen
Schwarzer Bären towards Teufen AR	S22	Schützengarten towards Trogen
Location
- Location within Switzerland Location within Canton of Appenzell Ausserrhoden

Vögelinsegg station is a railway station in the municipality of Speicher, in the canton of Appenzell Ausserrhoden, Switzerland. It is located along St. Gallerstrasse on the 1,000 mm (3 ft 3 3/8 in) Appenzell–St. Gallen–Trogen line of Appenzell Railways (Appenzeller Bahnen, AB), and is served by local light rail trains only.

The station is close to the ski lift Vögelinsegg.

== Services ==
Only S-Bahn services call at Vögelinsegg (stop only on request). As of the December 2024 timetable change, the station is served by the following services:

- St. Gallen S-Bahn:
  - S20: rush-hour service between Appenzell and Trogen, via St. Gallen (only calls at Niederteufen, Teufen AR and Bühler between St. Gallen and Gais).
  - S21: half-hourly service between Appenzell and Trogen, via St. Gallen.
  - S22: rush-hour service between Teufen AR and Trogen, via St. Gallen.

== See also ==
- Rail transport in Switzerland
