= St. Gallen Riethüsli railway station =

Train station in the city of St. Gallen, Switzerland

St. Gallen Riethüsli
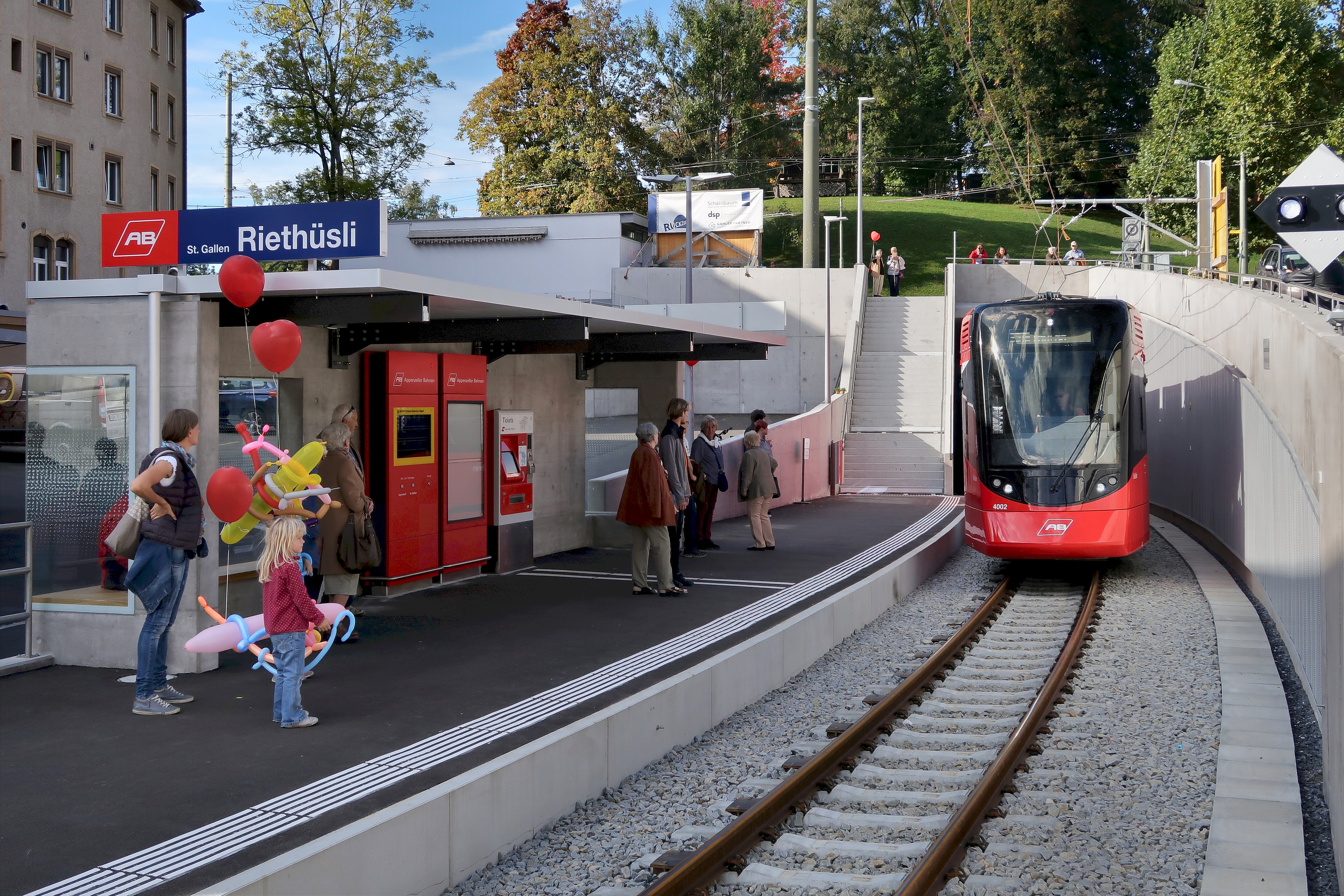
- A Tango light rail of Appenzell Railways at in 2018

General information
- Location: City of St. Gallen; Canton of St. Gallen, Switzerland
- Coordinates: 47°24′42″N 9°22′02″E
- Elevation: 749 m (2,457 ft)
- Lines: Appenzell–St. Gallen–Trogen railway; (St. Gallen-Gais-Appenzell railway until 2018)
- Platforms: 1 side platform
- Tracks: 1
- Train operators: Appenzell Railways
- Connections
- Trolleybus: VBSG trolleybus route 5
- Bus: PostAuto bus route 180

Other information
- Fare zone: 210 (Tarifverbund Ostwind)

Services
| Preceding station | St. Gallen S-Bahn | Following station |
|---|---|---|
| Lustmühle towards Appenzell | S21 | St. Gallen Güterbahnhof towards Trogen |
| Lustmühle towards Teufen AR | S22 | St. Gallen Güterbahnhof towards Trogen |
Location
- Location within Switzerland Location within Canton of St. Gallen

St. Gallen Riethüsli station is a railway station in the city of St. Gallen, in the canton of St. Gallen, Switzerland. It is located on the 1,000 mm (3 ft 3 3/8 in) Appenzell–St. Gallen–Trogen line of Appenzell Railways (Appenzeller Bahnen, AB), and is served by local light rail trains only. There is a bus stop for local and regional buses near the railway station.

The station opened in 2018 together with the Ruckhalde Tunnel.

== Services ==
The station is served by S-Bahn trains and two bus routes.

=== S-Bahn ===
As of the December 2024 timetable change, the following services stop at the station (stop only on request):

- St. Gallen S-Bahn:
  - S21: half-hourly service between Appenzell and Trogen, via St. Gallen.
  - S22: rush-hour service between Teufen AR and Trogen, via St. Gallen.

=== Bus ===
The station is served by a trolleybus line of Verkehrsbetriebe St. Gallen (VBSG), and a regional bus route of PostAuto.

== See also ==
- Rail transport in Switzerland
