= Trolleybuses in Warsaw =

Warsaw trolleybus system
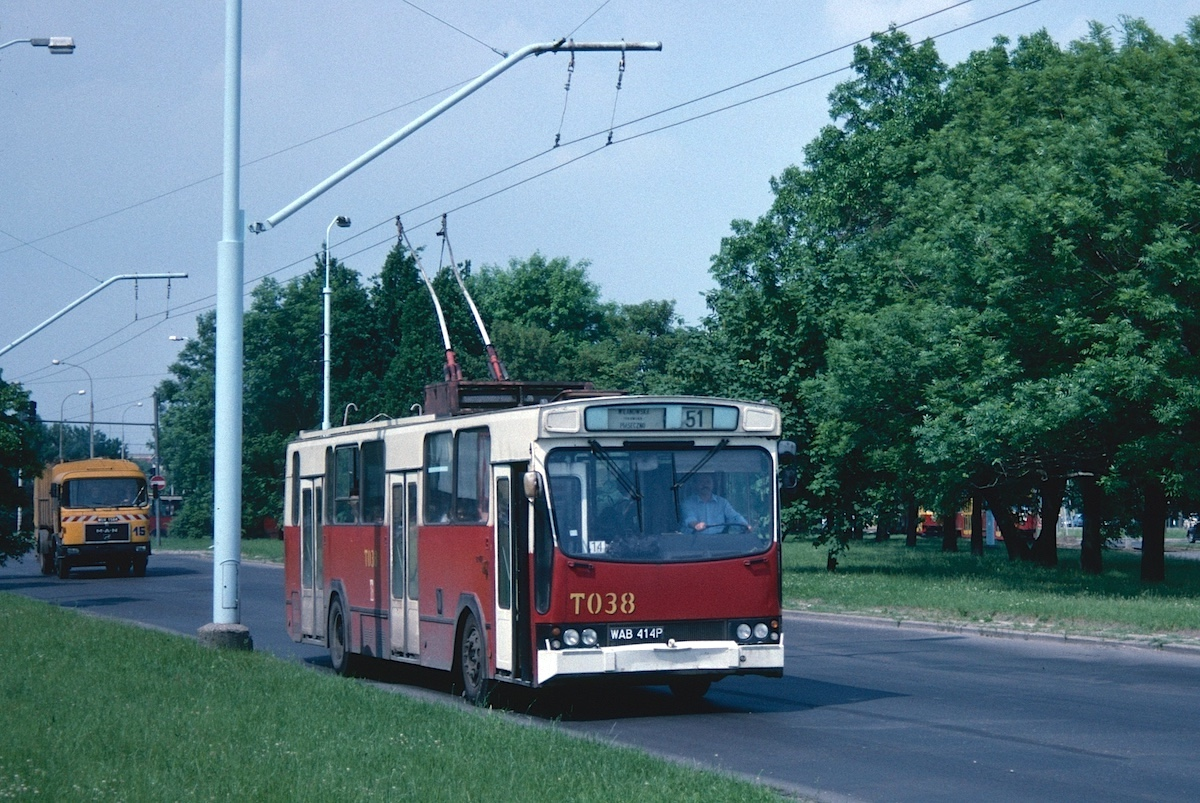
- One of Warsaw's Jelcz trolleybuses in service in June 1995

Operation
- Locale: Warsaw, Poland

Statistics
First era: 1946–1973
- Status: Closed
- Routes: 10 (maximum)
Second era: 1983–1995
- Status: Closed
- Routes: 1
- Operator: Public Transport Authority (from 1992)
- Electrification: 600 V DC parallel overhead lines
- Route length: 12.5 km (7.8 mi)
- Website: Public Transport Authority

A Warsaw trolleybus system formed part of the public transport network of Warsaw, the capital city of Poland, during two separate periods. The first trolleybus system was established in 1946 and lasted until 1973. It had a maximum of 10 routes. The second system, comprising only one route, was in operation from 1983 until 1995. Between 1992 and its closure, it was operated by Zarząd Transportu Miejskiego (ZTM), in English the Public Transport Authority (Warsaw).

== History ==
During World War II, most of the mass transit infrastructure in Warsaw was destroyed. The city was in need of a cheap and efficient transport network. In 1945, thirty secondhand trolleybuses, along with material for installation of overhead lines, were obtained from the Moscow trolleybus system, in the Soviet Union, and the first two lines in Warsaw opened on 5 January 1946. They operated from Plac Unii Lubelskiej to Warszawa Gdańska train station, and from the Łazienkowska depot to the city centre (ulica Piękna). In March 1946, another line was opened (Plac Saski–Bonifraterska), but was closed and replaced by trams in December. By 1955, five new trolleybus lines were opened and existing ones extended, covering mainly the city centre.

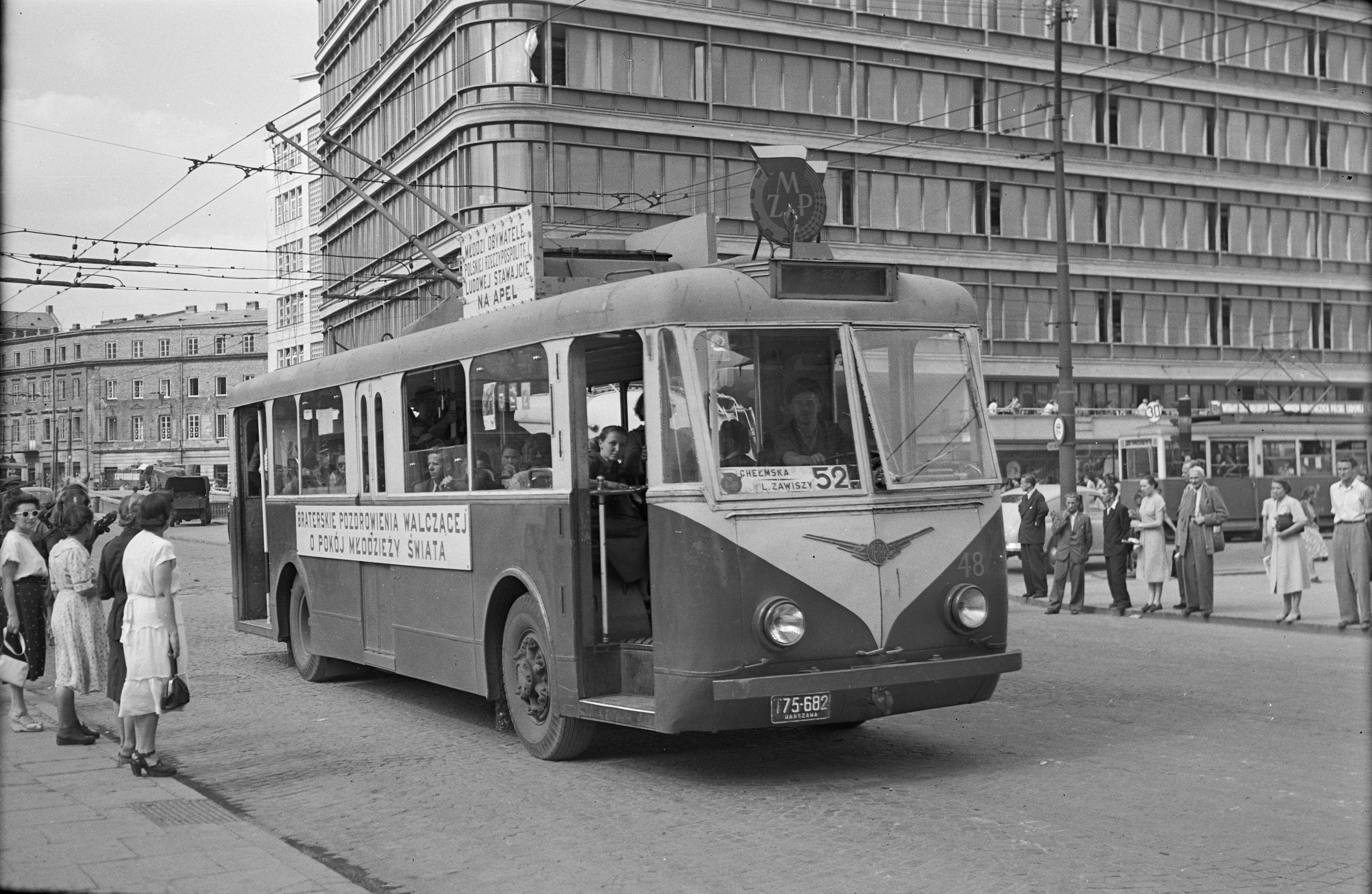
One of Warsaw's Vétra trolleybuses, in 1952

The first system's fleet had also included 15 French-built Vétra trolleybuses, purchased new in 1947, and 30 East German-built LOWA vehicles, received in 1952–53. These were later supplanted by trolleybuses built by Škoda, in what was then Czechoslovakia. They included seven of model 7Tr, 45 of model 8Tr and 77 of model 9Tr, though not all in service during the same periods.

1967 started a period of fast decline in both the number of trolleybuses and the trolleybus lines in Warsaw. The national government policy at the time was that as much Polish coal as possible be exported while the oil be imported at very low prices from the USSR. It was decided that electricity production should be decreased in order to save coal for export. The last trolleybus line (52) closed on 29 June 1973.

== Second system ==
The last period of the Warsaw trolleybus history started in 1977, when it was decided that the existing vehicles should be used on a new line between Warsaw and the southern suburb of Piaseczno. An additional longer route to Piaseczno was planned, through Wilanów, Powsin and Konstancin-Jeziorna. However, economic conditions made construction of the latter line impossible, and only the former, on the direct route between Warsaw and Piaseczno, was opened. This single route, numbered 51, opened on 1 June 1983, returning trolleybus service to Warsaw. In the meantime, it had been decided to purchase new trolleybuses, and these came from Uritsky (ZIU), in Russia, model ZIU-682. These wore a red-and-cream paint scheme. New trolleybuses were also purchased from the Polish manufacturer, Jelcz. Route 51 was 12.5 km (7.8 mi) long, and the depot (garage) was located only about 1.5 km (0.93 mi) from the outer end of the line.

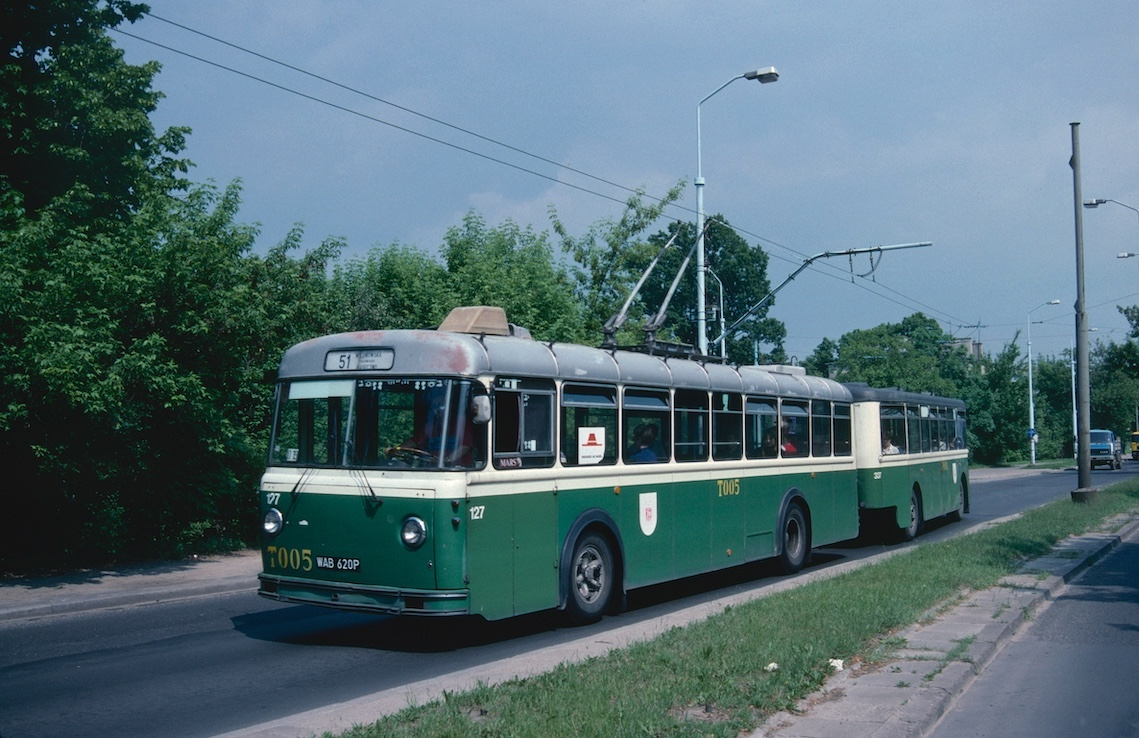
An ex-St. Gallen trolleybus + trailer set on route 51 in June 1995

After 1989 it became apparent that the ZIU trolleybuses were in need of replacement, and that the cost of running a single line was very high. In 1992, additional trolleybuses were acquired secondhand from the St. Gallen trolleybus system, in Switzerland. These comprised St. Gallen trolleybuses 119–130, built in 1957–58 by Saurer, and a number of passenger trailers, built in 1969–70. These entered service in 1992, with new fleet numbers but keeping their green-and-cream St. Gallen livery. The ZIU trolleybuses were withdrawn in 1993. By 1995, the 1957 Saurer trolleybuses had become "among the oldest trolleybuses still in service anywhere in the world".

In 1995, the Warsaw City Council decided to discontinue the service. The final day of operation was 31 August 1995. The trolleybus depot at Iwiczna, in Piaseczno, was closed, and the vehicles were placed in storage. The decision was taken to reduce costs. The depot had been designed for 300 vehicles but was only being used by 39 (counting trailers). In July 2000, what had been an indefinite closure was made permanent. The remaining vehicles were sold to Gdynia and Lublin, and to various museums.

== See also ==
- List of trolleybus systems
