= St. Gallen Spisertor railway station =

Train station in the city of St. Gallen, Switzerland

St. Gallen Spisertor
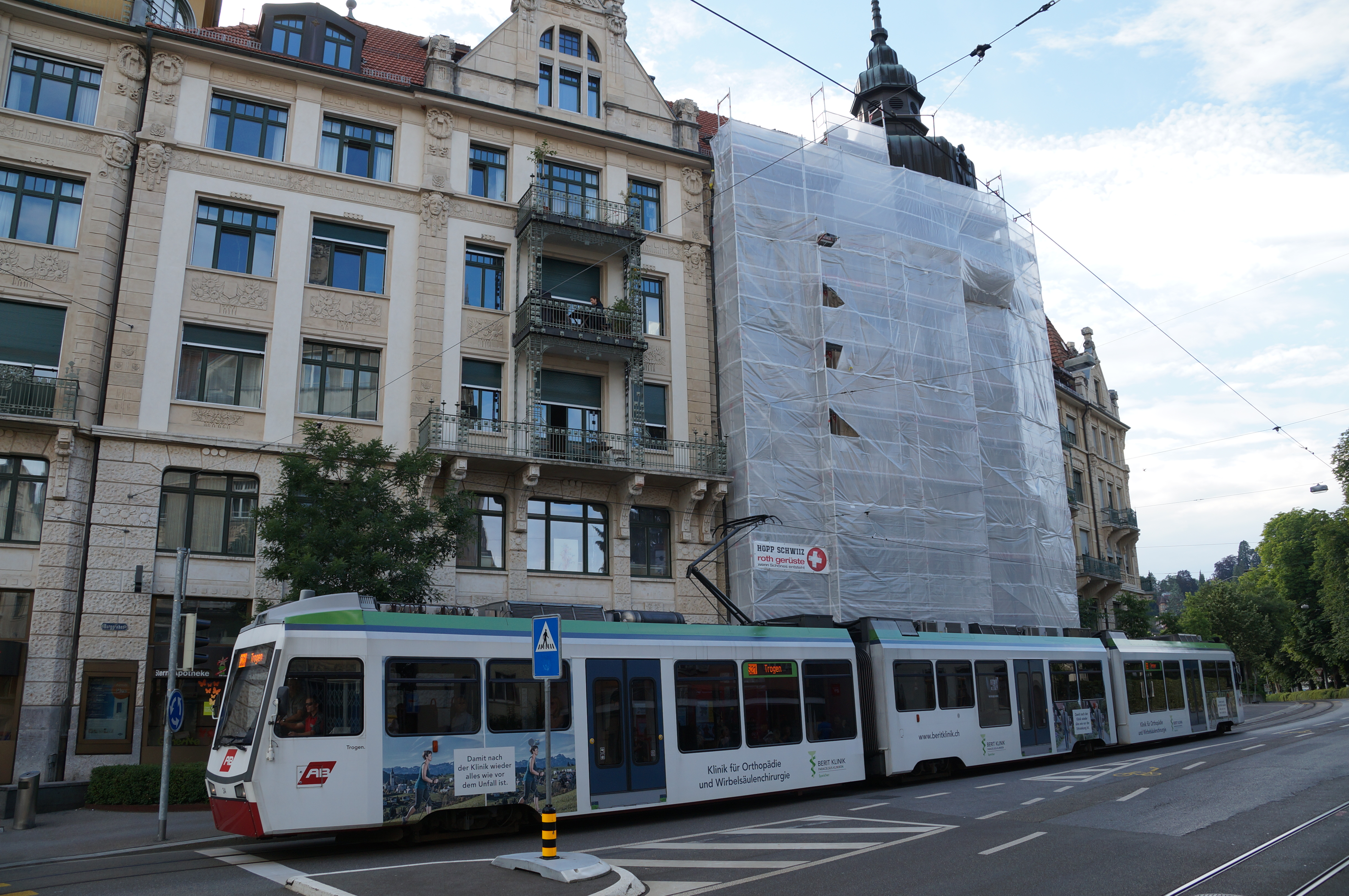
- Former Be 4/8 light rail of AB at the station in 2018

General information
- Location: City of St. Gallen; Canton of St. Gallen, Switzerland
- Coordinates: 47°25′30″N 9°22′48″E
- Elevation: 671 m (2,201 ft)
- Lines: Appenzell–St. Gallen–Trogen railway; (St. Gallen–Trogen railway until 2018)
- Platforms: 2 (street-level boarding)
- Tracks: 2
- Train operators: Appenzell Railways
- Connections
- Bus: Regiobus route 151

Other information
- Fare zone: 210 (Tarifverbund Ostwind)

Services
Preceding station	St. Gallen S-Bahn	Following station
St. Gallen Marktplatz towards Appenzell	S20	St. Gallen Schülerhaus towards Trogen
St. Gallen Marktplatz towards Appenzell	S21	St. Gallen Schülerhaus towards Trogen
St. Gallen Marktplatz towards Teufen AR	S22	St. Gallen Schülerhaus towards Trogen
Location
- Location within Switzerland Location within Canton of St. Gallen

St. Gallen Spisertor station is a railway station in the city of St. Gallen, in the canton of St. Gallen, Switzerland. It is located on the 1,000 mm (3 ft 3 3/8 in) Appenzell–St. Gallen–Trogen line of Appenzell Railways (Appenzeller Bahnen, AB), and is served by local light rail trains only. There is also a bus stop for a regional bus line.

The station is named after one of the city's seven former gates (Spisertor, dismantled in 1879). It is close to the Hotel am Spisertor.

== Services ==
The station is served by S-Bahn trains and one regional bus route. As of the December 2024 timetable change, the following services stop at the station:

- St. Gallen S-Bahn:
  - S20: rush-hour service between Appenzell and Trogen, via St. Gallen (only calls at Niederteufen, Teufen AR and Bühler between St. Gallen and Gais).
  - S21: half-hourly service between Appenzell and Trogen, via St. Gallen.
  - S22: rush-hour service between Teufen AR and Trogen, via St. Gallen.

The station is also the terminus of Regiobus line 151 to Gossau SG station.

== See also ==
- Rail transport in Switzerland
