= Schwarzer Bären railway station =

Train station in the city of St. Gallen, Switzerland

Schwarzer Bären
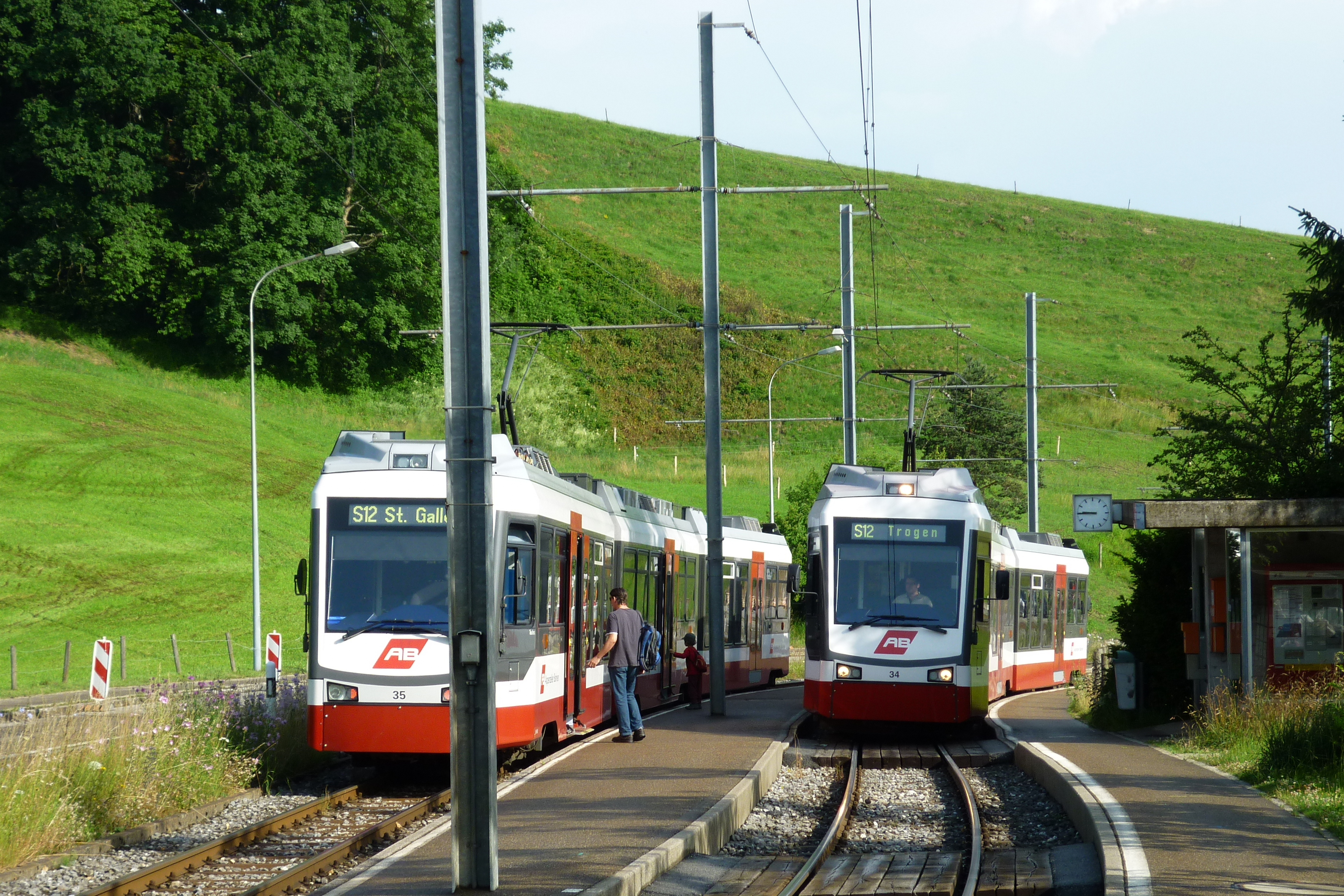
- Former Be 4/8 light rail of AB at the station in 2012

General information
- Location: City of St. Gallen; Canton of St. Gallen, Switzerland
- Coordinates: 47°25′19″N 9°24′54″E
- Elevation: 855 m (2,805 ft)
- Lines: Appenzell–St. Gallen–Trogen railway; (St. Gallen–Trogen railway until 2018)
- Platforms: 2 side platforms
- Tracks: 2
- Train operators: Appenzell Railways

Other information
- Fare zone: 210 (Tarifverbund Ostwind)

Services
Preceding station	St. Gallen S-Bahn	Following station
St. Gallen Notkersegg towards Appenzell	S20	Vögelinsegg towards Trogen
St. Gallen Notkersegg towards Appenzell	S21	Vögelinsegg towards Trogen
St. Gallen Notkersegg towards Teufen AR	S22	Vögelinsegg towards Trogen
Location
- Location within Switzerland Location within Canton of St. Gallen

Schwarzer Bären station is a railway station in the city of St. Gallen, in the canton of St. Gallen, Switzerland. It is located along Speicherstrasse on the 1,000 mm (3 ft 3 3/8 in) Appenzell–St. Gallen–Trogen line of Appenzell Railways (Appenzeller Bahnen, AB), and is served by local light rail trains only.

The station is close to Wenigerweiher.

== Services ==
Only S-Bahn services call at Schwarzer Bären (stop only on request). As of the December 2024 timetable change, the station is served by the following services:

- St. Gallen S-Bahn:
  - S20: rush-hour service between Appenzell and Trogen, via St. Gallen (only calls at Niederteufen, Teufen AR and Bühler between St. Gallen and Gais).
  - S21: half-hourly service between Appenzell and Trogen, via St. Gallen.
  - S22: rush-hour service between Teufen AR and Trogen, via St. Gallen.

== See also ==
- Rail transport in Switzerland
