= St. Gallen Güterbahnhof railway station =

Train station in the city of St. Gallen, Switzerland

St. Gallen Güterbahnhof
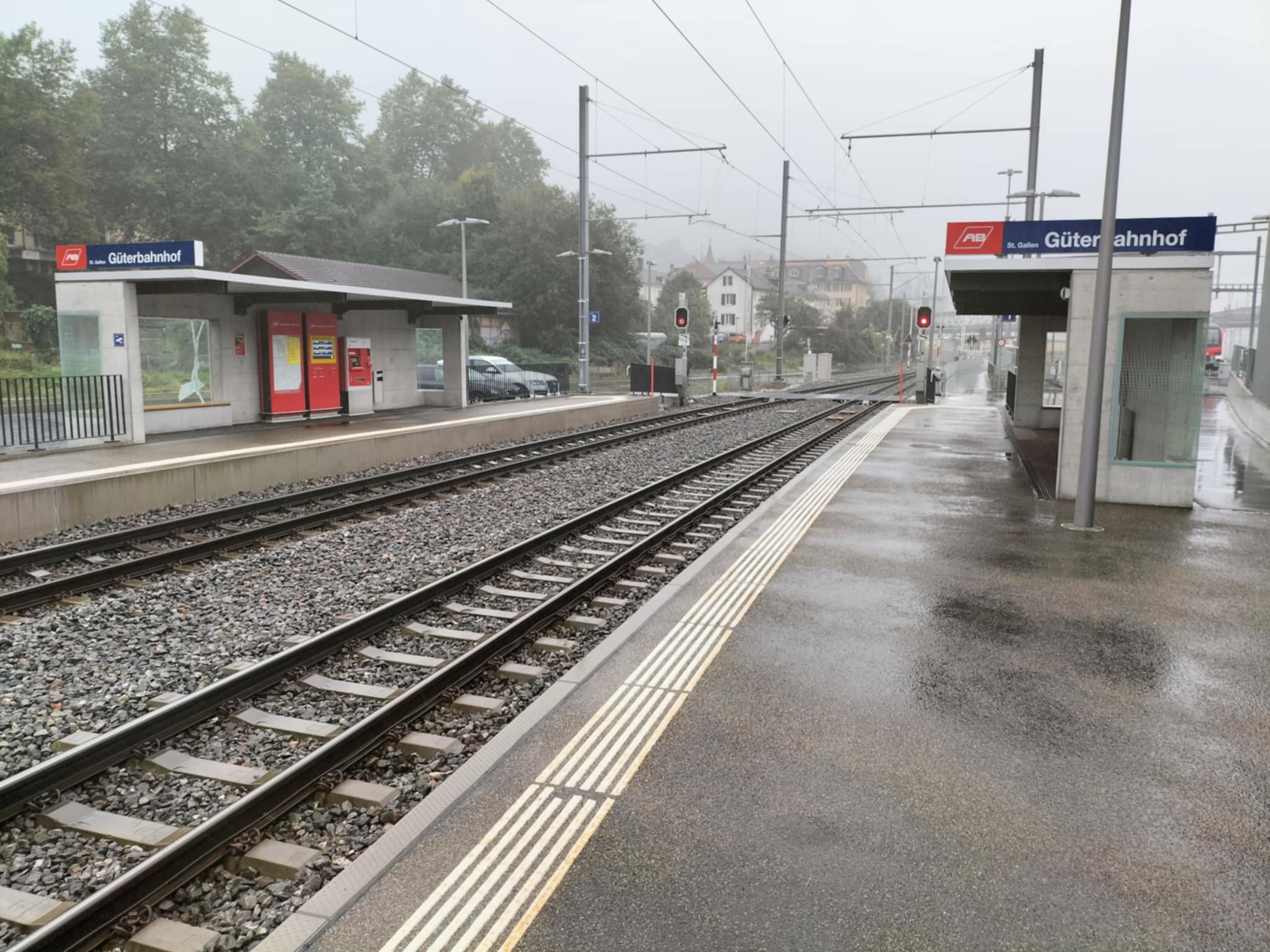
- The station in 2025

General information
- Location: City of St. Gallen; Canton of St. Gallen, Switzerland
- Coordinates: 47°25′02″N 9°21′45″E
- Elevation: 676.10 m (2,218.2 ft)
- Line: Appenzell–St. Gallen–Trogen railway
- Platforms: 2 side platform
- Tracks: 2
- Train operators: Appenzell Railways

Other information
- Fare zone: 210 (Tarifverbund Ostwind)

Services
Preceding station	St. Gallen S-Bahn	Following station
St. Gallen Riethüsli towards Appenzell	S21	St. Gallen towards Trogen
St. Gallen Riethüsli towards Teufen AR	S22	St. Gallen towards Trogen
Location
- Location within Switzerland Location within Canton of St. Gallen

St. Gallen Güterbahnhof station is a railway station in the city of St. Gallen, in the canton of St. Gallen, Switzerland. It is located on the 1,000 mm (3 ft 3 3/8 in) Appenzell–St. Gallen–Trogen line of Appenzell Railways (Appenzeller Bahnen, AB), and is served by local light rail trains only.

The station opened in 2021 after the course of the railway line was changed locally, which allowed trains to take a more direct route between St. Gallen main station and Riethüsli station. It is named after the adjacent former goods station (Güterbahnhof).

== Services ==
The station is served by S-Bahn trains only (stop on request). As of the December 2024 timetable change, the following services stop at the station:

- St. Gallen S-Bahn:
  - S21: half-hourly service between Appenzell and Trogen, via St. Gallen.
  - S22: rush-hour service between Teufen AR and Trogen, via St. Gallen.

== See also ==
- Rail transport in Switzerland
