= St. Gallen Schülerhaus railway station =

Train station in the city of St. Gallen, Switzerland

St. Gallen Schülerhaus

General information
- Location: City of St. Gallen; Canton of St. Gallen, Switzerland
- Coordinates: 47°25′30″N 9°23′17″E
- Elevation: 696 m (2,283 ft)
- Lines: Appenzell–St. Gallen–Trogen railway; (St. Gallen–Trogen railway until 2018)
- Platforms: 2 (street-level boarding)
- Tracks: 2
- Train operators: Appenzell Railways

Other information
- Fare zone: 210 (Tarifverbund Ostwind)

Services
Preceding station	St. Gallen S-Bahn	Following station
St. Gallen Spisertor towards Appenzell	S20	St. Gallen Birnbäumen towards Trogen
St. Gallen Spisertor towards Appenzell	S21	St. Gallen Birnbäumen towards Trogen
St. Gallen Spisertor towards Teufen AR	S22	St. Gallen Birnbäumen towards Trogen
Location
- Location within Switzerland Location within Canton of St. Gallen

St. Gallen Schülerhaus station is a railway station in the city of St. Gallen, in the canton of St. Gallen, Switzerland. It is located along Speicherstrasse on the 1,000 mm (3 ft 3 3/8 in) Appenzell–St. Gallen–Trogen line of Appenzell Railways (Appenzeller Bahnen, AB), and is served by local light rail trains only.

== Services ==
Only S-Bahn services call at St. Gallen Schülerhaus (stop only on request). As of the December 2024 timetable change, the station is served by the following services:

- St. Gallen S-Bahn:
  - S20: rush-hour service between Appenzell and Trogen, via St. Gallen (only calls at Niederteufen, Teufen AR and Bühler between St. Gallen and Gais).
  - S21: half-hourly service between Appenzell and Trogen, via St. Gallen.
  - S22: rush-hour service between Teufen AR and Trogen, via St. Gallen.

== See also ==
- Rail transport in Switzerland
