= Dopravní podnik Ostrava =

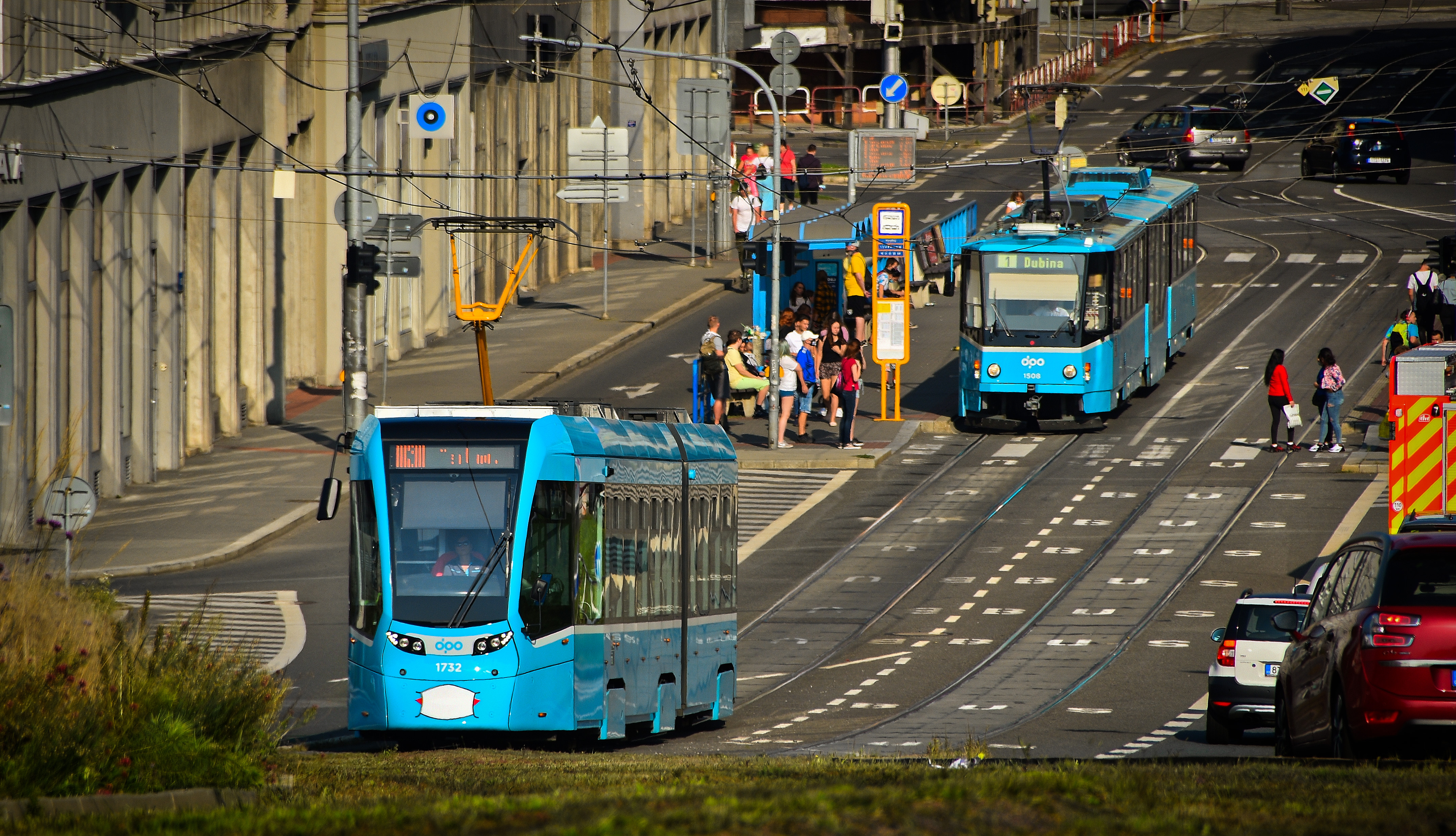
Ostrava trams

Dopravní podnik Ostrava (DPO, Ostrava Transport Company) is the primary operator of public transport in the city of Ostrava. It provides tram, bus and trolleybus service mostly in the city of Ostrava, including selected lines running to neighboring towns. The company participates in ODIS, the integrated transport system of the Moravian-Silesian Region.

== History ==
The transport company was formed in 1949 from a merger of the companies Společnost moravských místních drah, Zemských drah, Místní drahy Ostrava-Karviná and Vítkovické závodní dráhy. Today DPO is entirely owned by the City of Ostrava. DPO today owns 71 trolleybuses, 205 trams and 294 buses.

== Lines ==
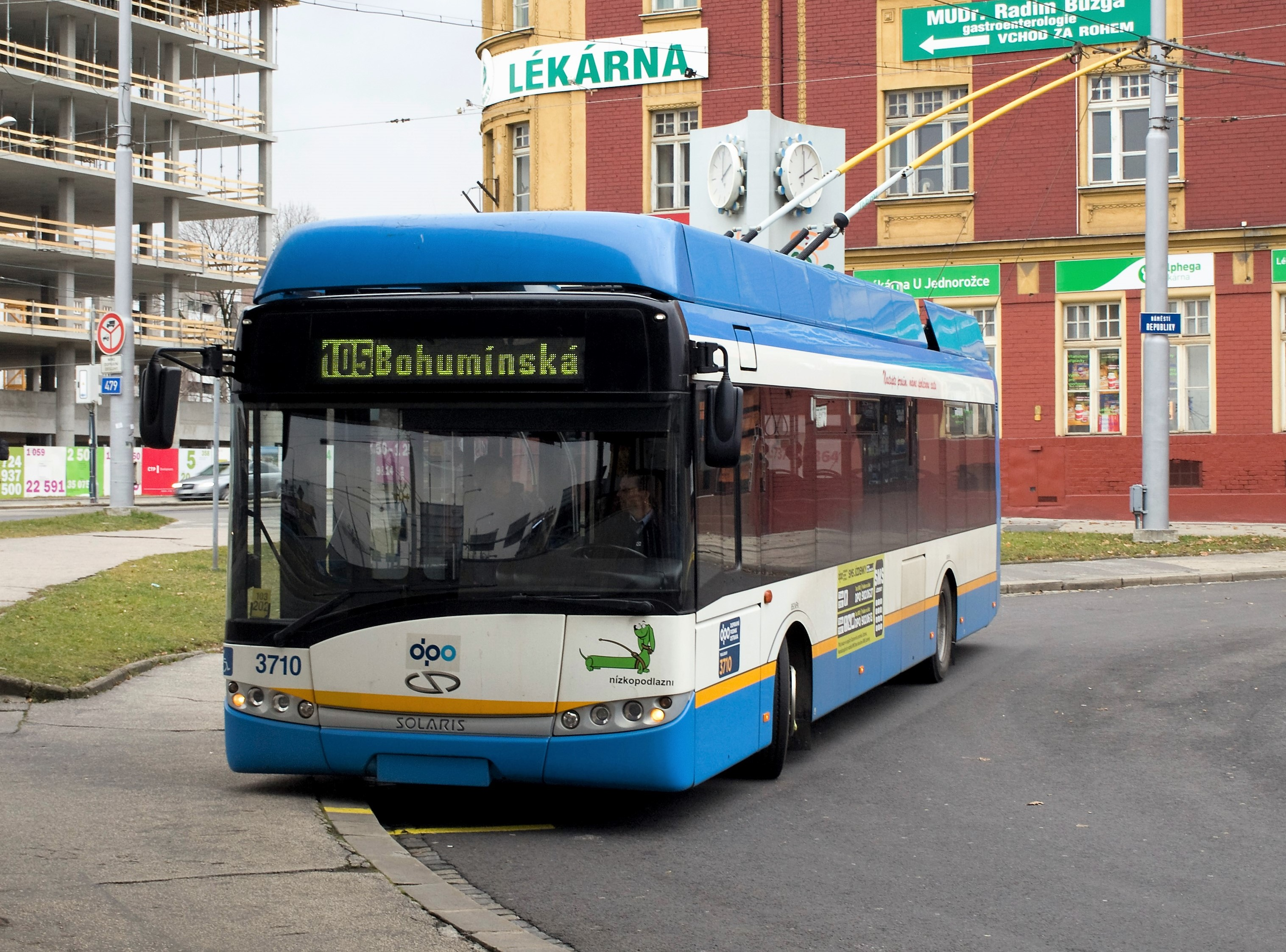
Ostrava trolleybus.

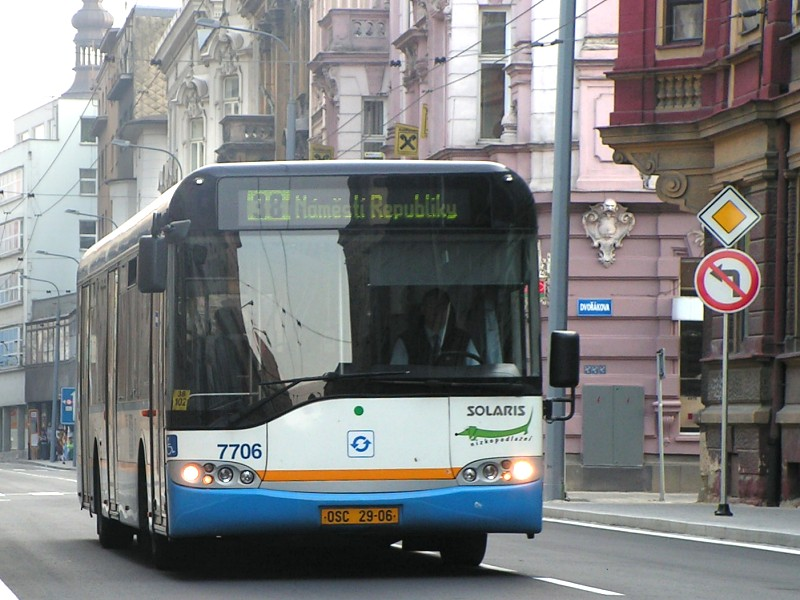
Ostrava Bus

DPO runs 16 tramway lines, 12 trolleybus lines and 57 bus lines. The first tram line was opened on 18 August 1894 from the train station to Vítkovice. It was opened to the public on 1 May 1901. Steam trams ran until 1922. Trolleybuses have operated in Ostrava since 1952. The first line was a circular one from Náměstí Republiky to Prokešovo náměstí. DPO wanted new lines in 2014. Buses have operated in Ostrava since 1930.
