= Trolleybuses in St. Gallen =

Transit system in St. Gallen, Switzerland

St. Gallen trolleybus system
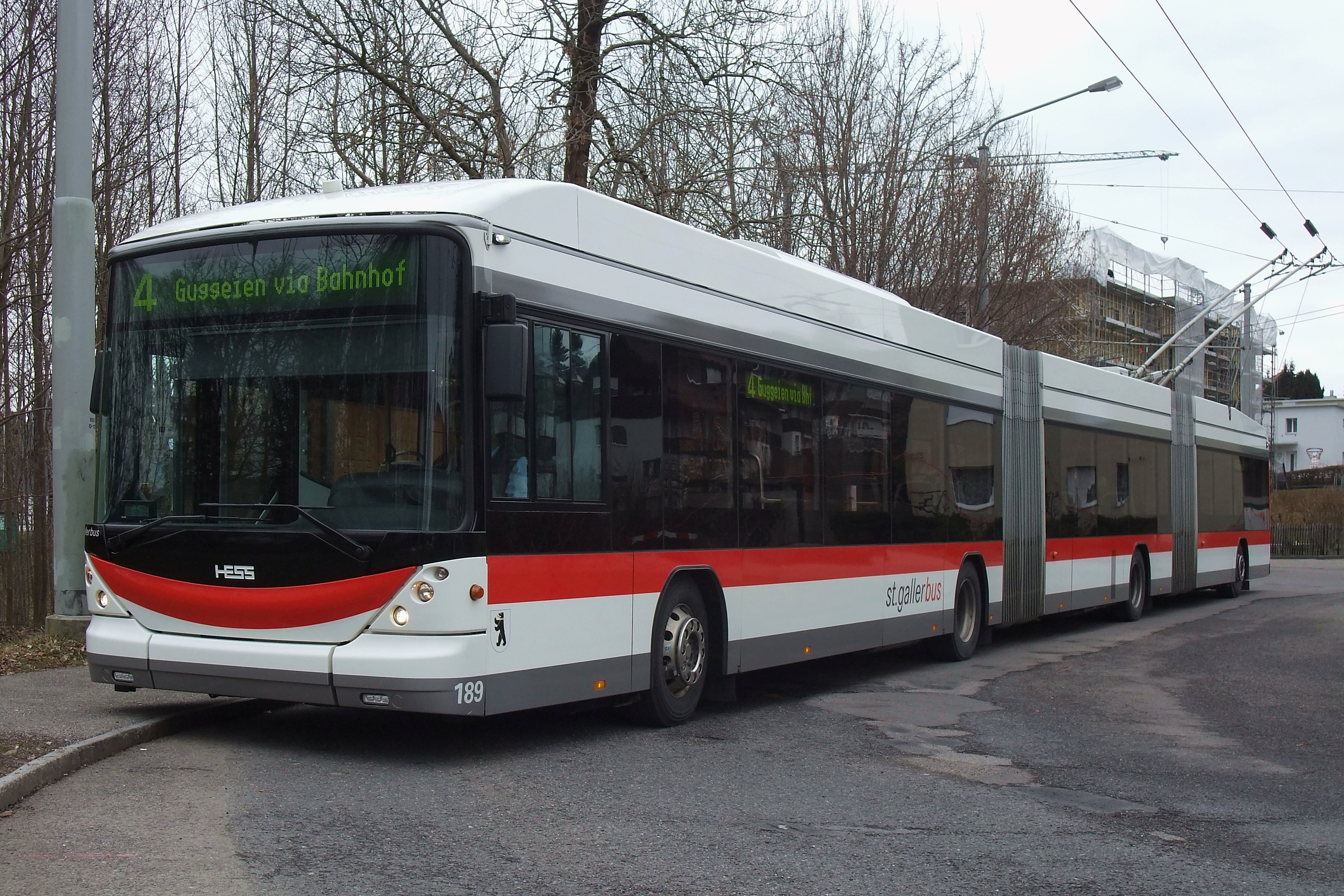
- VBSG Hess bi-articulated trolleybus no. 189, in 2012.

Operation
- Locale: St. Gallen, Switzerland
- Open: 18 July 1950
- Status: Open
- Routes: 4
- Operator: Verkehrsbetriebe St.Gallen (VBSG)

Infrastructure
- Electrification: 600 V DC

Statistics
- Route length: 22.6 km (14.0 mi)
Overview
- Website: http://www.vbsg.ch Verkehrsbetriebe der Stadt St. Gallen VBS (in German)

The St. Gallen trolleybus system (Alemannic German: Trolleybussystem St. Gallen) forms part of the public transport network of St. Gallen, the capital city of the canton of St. Gallen, Switzerland.

Opened in 1950, the system is currently operated by Verkehrsbetriebe St.Gallen (VBSG). As of 2012, it consists of a cross-city line and three radial lines, all of which meet at St. Gallen railway station, and has a total route length of 22.6 km (14.0 mi).

== History ==
In the 1950s, the trolleybus system gradually replaced the St. Gallen tramway network. The last tram ran on 30 September 1957. The individual trolleybus line sections went into service as follows:

18 July 1950	Bahnhof–Riethüsli	Line 5	Tramway replacement
15 November 1950	Bahnhof–Heiligkreuz	Line 3	Tramway replacement
1 October 1957	Stocken–Erlachstrasse–Bahnhof–Neudorf	Line 1	Tramway replacement
1968	Neudorf–Stephanshorn	Line 1	New connection
1970	Bahnhof–Rotmonten	Line 5	Motorbus replacement
1 April 1989	Stocken–Bahnhof Winkeln	Line 1	Motorbus replacement
September 1991	Neudorf–Guggeien	Line 1	Motorbus replacement
28 September 1996	Erlachstrasse–Wolfganghof	Line 1	Motorbus replacement
28 May 2000	Bahnhof Winkeln–Winkeln (500 metres)	Line 1	New connection

== Lines ==
As of the December 2024 timetable change, system is made up of the following lines:

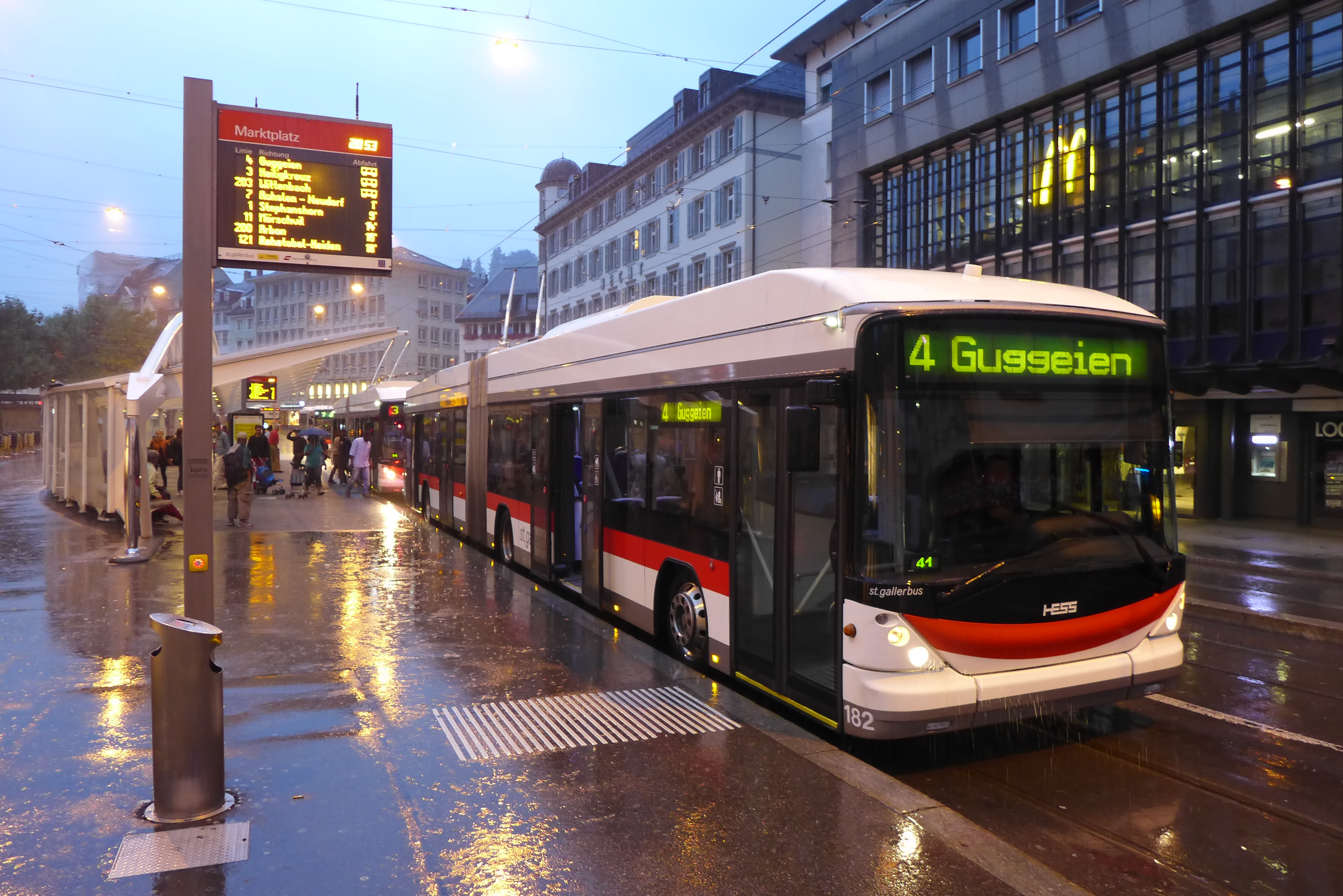
St. Gallen articulated trolleybuses in Marktplatz in the inner city in 2014.

1	Winkeln–Erlachstrasse–Bahnhof–Neudorf–Stephanshorn	Business days at 12-minute intervals	Operated by seven vehicle runs (or duties)
3	Bahnhof–Heiligkreuz	Business days at 7.5-minute intervals	Operated by four vehicle runs
4	Wolfganghof–Erlachstrasse–Bahnhof–Neudorf–Guggeien	Business days at 12-minute intervals	Operated by four vehicle runs
5	Riethüsli–Bahnhof–Rotmonten	Business days at 10-minute intervals	Operated by four vehicle runs

To this day, the Trogenerbahn (Trogen Railway) runs through the inner city between the station and Brühltor on the rails of the former tramway, and thus parallel to the trolleybuses. The two modes of transport still share a common electrical substation. In the relevant section of the common route, the overhead wire voltage is only 600 V DC, as is the rest of the trolleybus system. By contrast, the remainder of the Trogenerbahn route was energised at 1,000 V DC. It now forms part of the Appenzell–St. Gallen–Trogen railway and the section that was energised at 1,000 V DC, is now energised at 1,500 V DC.

In Riethüsli, the terminus of Line 5, there is an interchange station for changing between the trolleybus system and the electrically operated Appenzell–St. Gallen–Trogen railway. Before the opening of the Ruckhalde Tunnel and rerouting of the line in 2018, the two systems used common overhead catenary poles at that station and suspension wires for about 300 m (980 ft), but were electrically isolated from each other.

Line 4 has existed only since 9 December 2007. Previously, line 1 had had three different termini from 1991, and four from 1996.

== Fleet ==
=== Retired fleet ===
Fleet nos.	Quantity	Built	Manufacturer	Electrics	Type	Configuration	Notes
101–118	18	1950	Saurer	BBC		Rigid (two-axle)	Rebodied later; see 131–148
119–130	12	1957–58	Saurer	BBC	4 TP	Rigid	Withdrawn 1991–92
131–148	18	1968–75	Saurer	BBC		Rigid	Chassis ex-101–118 (not in sequence); withdrawn 1985–92
101–111	11	1984–85	Saurer / Hess	BBC-Sécheron	GT 560/620-25	Articulated	Withdrawn 2008
151–154, 156–168	17	1991–92	NAW / Hess	ABB	BGT 5-25	Articulated	No. 155 converted to bi-articulated and kept in service (see below); others withdrawn 2008–09
151–152 (to 1957); 301–302 (from 1957)	2	1953–54	Moser / Ramseier & Jenzer	none		Trailer	Withdrawn
303–327	25	1957	Moser / FFA	none		Trailer	Also hauled by motorbuses; withdrawn starting in 1985
328–339	12	1969–70	Hess / R&J or Moser	none		Trailer	Also hauled by motorbuses; withdrawn between 1985 and 1992

The original group numbered 101–118, the fleet that opened the system in 1950, were rebodied by Hess between 1968 and 1975 and fitted with a new backup battery. They were simultaneously renumbered as fleet nos. 131–148, but not in the same sequence. Trailer operations ended either in 1991 or in March 1992.

=== Disposal abroad ===
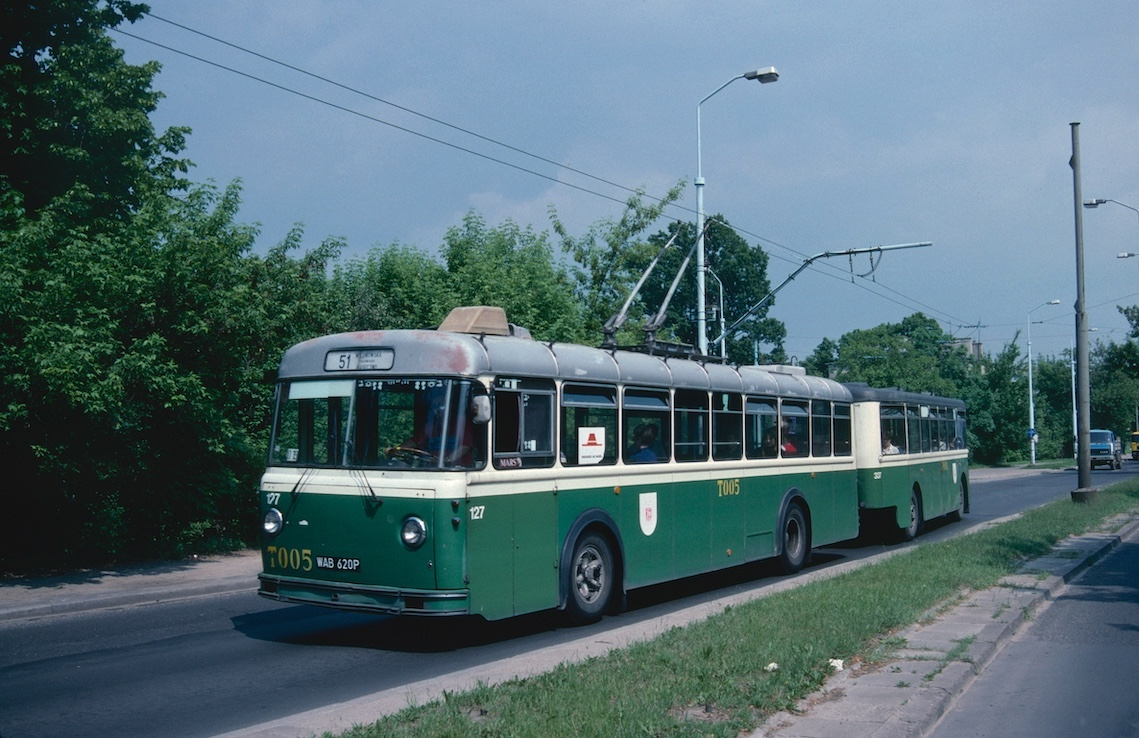
An ex-St. Gallen trolleybus + trailer set in service on the Warsaw trolleybus system in 1995, still wearing St. Gallen livery

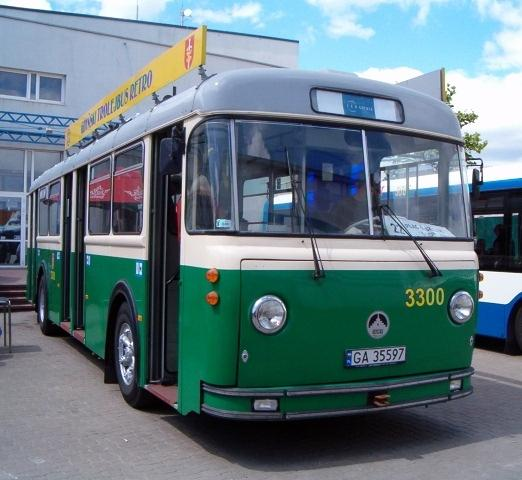
The former St. Gallen trolleybus no. 128 as a heritage vehicle in Gdynia in 2006

- In 1992, all twelve trolleybuses of the 1957–58 series were sold, together with the 1969–70 trailers, to the Warsaw trolleybus system in Poland, and were placed in service. That system was nevertheless closed soon afterwards, in 1995. One of the former St. Gallen/Warsaw trolleybuses (No. 128) was sold in 2001 to the Gdynia trolleybus system, also in Poland, where it later came into use as a heritage vehicle, renumbered 3300, operating service occasionally. By 2012, its original, St. Gallen fleet number of 128 had been restored.
- Trolleybuses 142, 143, 144, 146 and 147 were sold in 1992 to the Valparaíso trolleybus system in Chile, but they were used in service there only briefly – most in 1992 only, with one (142) in sporadic use until 1995 or early 1996. Since 17 November 2008, ex-St. Gallen trolleybus no. 142 has been used there as a staff break room and souvenir sales outlet at the Barón terminus.
- Nine type GT 560/620-25 Saurer/Hess trolleybuses (nos. 102–108, 110 and 111) were donated by the VBSG to the Plovdiv trolleybus system in Bulgaria in 2008 and 2009.
- In 2010, the type BGT 5-25 trolleybuses were sold to the Sarajevo trolleybus system in Bosnia-Herzegovina.

=== Current fleet ===
A total of 25 trolleybuses are currently available for use on the St. Gallen system; a maximum of 21 are required simultaneously. The present fleet comprises 17 articulated buses and eight bi-articulated buses, all of which are of low-floor design:

Fleet nos.	Quantity	Built	Manufacturer	Electrics	Type	Configuration
155	1	1991 / 2005	NAW / Hess	ABB	BGGT 5-25	bi-articulated
171–187	17	2008	Hess	Kiepe	BGT-N2C	articulated
188–194	7	2009	Hess	Kiepe	BGGT-N2C	bi-articulated

Fleet no. 155, which was originally a single-articulated, high-floor trolleybus, is an exceptional vehicle. Fourteen years after its entry into service, it was lengthened into a bi-articulated vehicle, by the addition of a second, low-floor, trailing segment. Simultaneously, its designation was changed from BGT 5–25 to BGGT 5-25.

Originally it was planned to carry out a similar conversion to eight or nine other vehicles of this type. However, due to technical problems with the prototype, it was decided instead to purchase the seven brand-new bi-articulated trolleybuses, nos. 188 to 194.

The bi-articulated vehicles provide a large proportion of the services on lines 1 and 4, although no. 155 runs solely on line 1. By contrast, only normal articulated trolleybuses are used on lines 3 and 5, except on one occasion when bi-articulated vehicles were used on line 3 during a special exhibition.

== See also ==
- List of trolleybus systems in Switzerland
