= Stadler Tango =

Light rail vehicle and tram

Tango (Bochum)
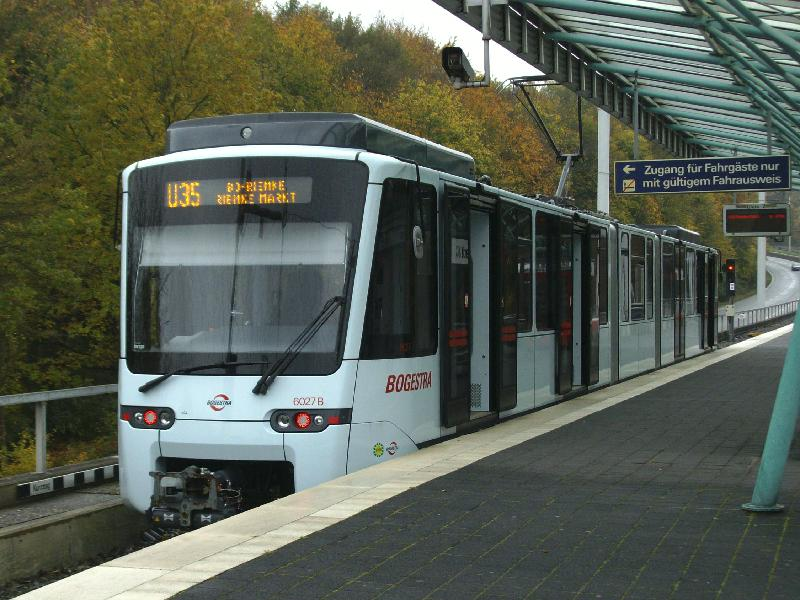
- Tango in Bochum
- Manufacturer: Stadler Rail
- Constructed: 2007–

Specifications
- Train length: 28,200 mm (92 ft 6 1/4 in)
- Width: 2,650 mm (8 ft 8 3/8 in)
- Height: 3,650 mm (12 ft 0 in)
- Wheel diameter: 740 mm (29.13 in)
- Maximum speed: 80 km/h (50 mph)
- Weight: Empty: 35,740 kg (78,790 lb)
- Traction motors: 4
- Power output: 4 × 125 kW (168 hp)
- Electric system: 750 V DC overhead wire
- Current collection: Pantograph
- UIC classification: Bo′2′Bo′
- Minimum turning radius: 25 m (82.02 ft)
- Track gauge: 1,435 mm (4 ft 8 1/2 in) standard gauge

Tango (Basel)
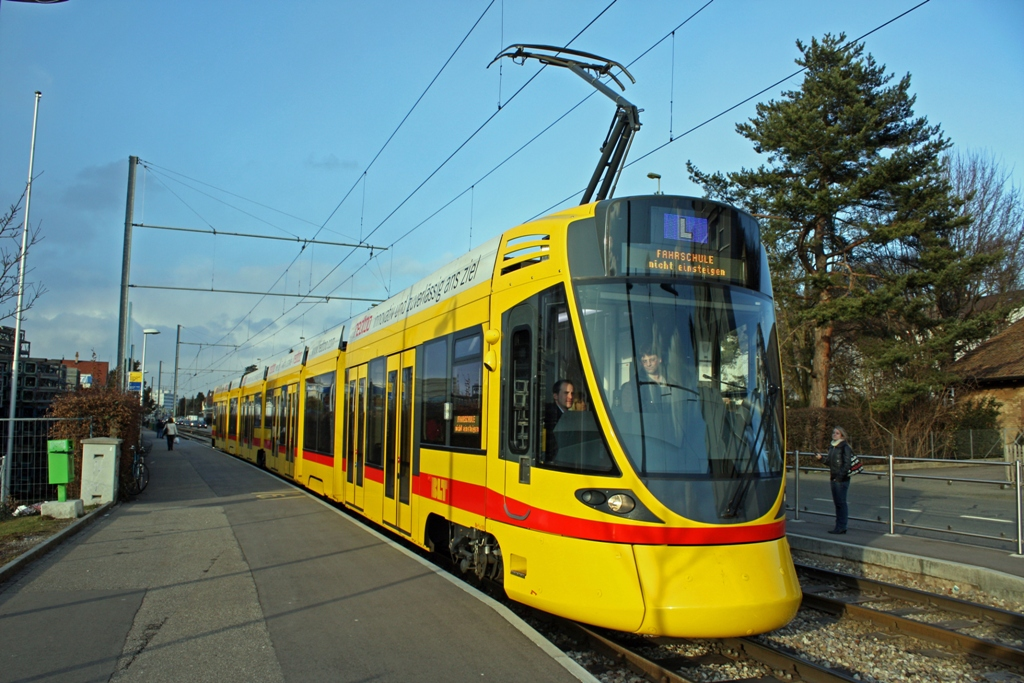
- Tango in Basel
- Manufacturer: Stadler Rail
- Constructed: 2008-

Specifications
- Train length: 45,000 mm (147 ft 7 5/8 in)
- Width: 2,300 mm (7 ft 6 1/2 in)
- Height: 3,510 mm (11 ft 6 1/4 in)
- Wheel diameter: Driving: 680 mm (26.77 in); Carrying: 580 mm (22.83 in)
- Maximum speed: 80 km/h (50 mph)
- Weight: Empty: 57.0 t (56.1 long tons; 62.8 short tons)
- Traction motors: 6
- Power output: 6 × 125 kW (168 hp)
- Electric system: 600 V DC overhead wire
- Current collection: Pantograph
- UIC classification: Bo′2′Bo′2′Bo′
- Track gauge: 1,000 mm (3 ft 3 3/8 in) metre gauge

The Tango is a family of light rail and tram vehicles made by Stadler Rail. It can be specified as either a 100% high-floor, 70% low-floor, or 100% low-floor articulated unit. It is in use in Aarhus, Bochum, Berlin (BVG-Class IK), Basel, Geneva, Kraków (Kraków - Lajkonik), Lyon, Ostrava (NF2), Sarajevo (NF3), and Helsinki in the future.

== Characteristics ==
The cities operating Tango are demanding the following characteristics for their rolling stock: speed (up to 100 km/h or 62 mph), robustness, security and compatibility with the common use of infrastructure, economic (capacity adapted to the traffic and prospects for their development) as well as comfort and aesthetics. In the case of the Appenzell Railways, the light rail needs to deal also with strong gradients in the foothills south of St. Gallen.

== Usage ==
In Lyon, the Tango tram is serving the express line Rhônexpress linking downtown with Saint Exupéry Airport, and its TGV train station, opened in 2010. An order of 32 vehicles was placed by the city of Geneva in December 2009. 20 were ordered by Stuttgarter Strassenbahnen, the first one being completed in September 2012.

Appenzeller Bahnen (AB) has contracted Stadler Rail to deliver seven new Tango for use on the new Appenzell–St. Gallen–Trogen railway starting from 2017. Previously, the western line from St. Gallen to Appenzell was operated by heavy rail with a rack section.

Aarhus Letbane will receive a mix of 12 Stadler Tango (with a top speed of 100 km/h) and 14 Stadler Variobahn, with a total of 26 units.

In 2016, Dopravní podnik Ostrava ordered 30 Stadler Tango NF2 (also known as nOVA) trams with an option for another 10 trams. All 40 trams were delivered between April 2018 and October 2019.

Sarajevo Tramway received its first Stadler Tango NF3 in December 2023, while 14 more were received by the summer of 2024. An additional 10 new trams were also bought.

The first 50 Stadler Tango Kraków - Lajkonik sets were received by the Miejskie Przedsiębiorstwo Komunikacyjne S.A. w Krakowie between 2020 and 2021. Between 2022 and 2023, a further 60 trams were delivered. They are internally referred to as the Lajkonik 1s and the Lajkonik 2s respectively.

Metropolitan Area Transport Ltd in Helsinki has signed a contract on 11 November 2026 for the supply of 63 Tango Nordic trams, with an option for up to 120 more. They will be delivered starting in 2029.

== Gallery ==
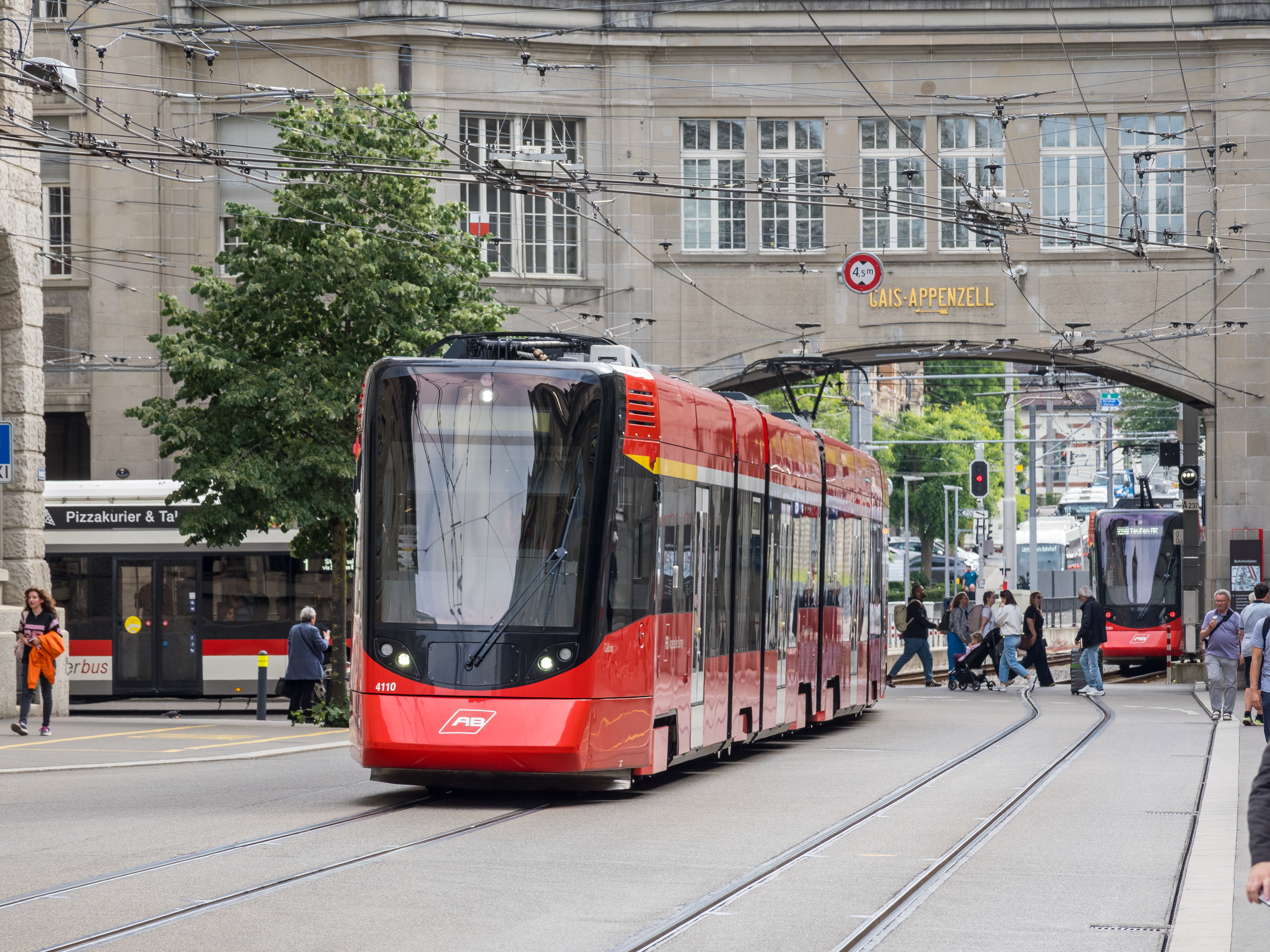
Tango in St. Gallen

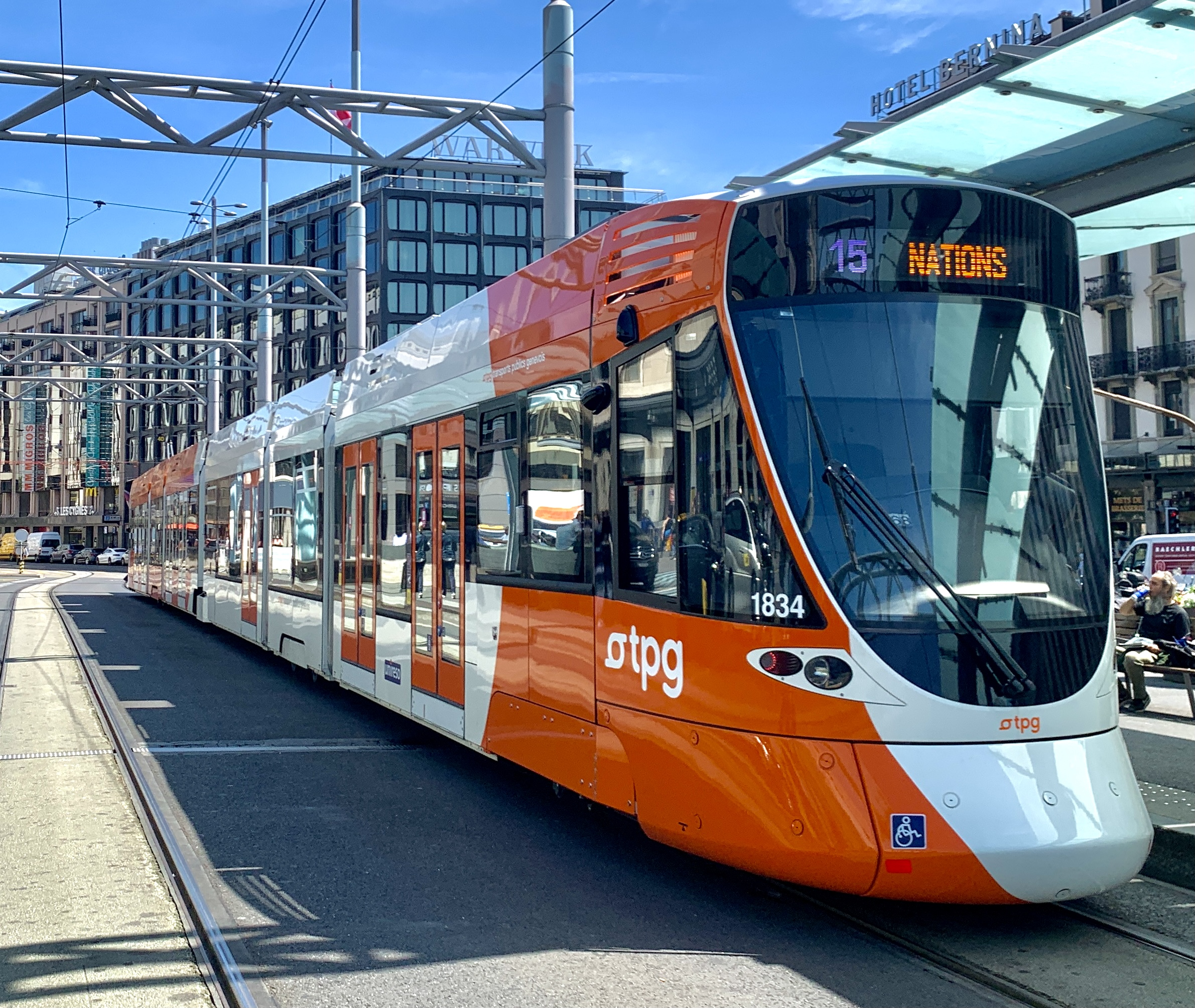
Tango in Geneva's public transport livery

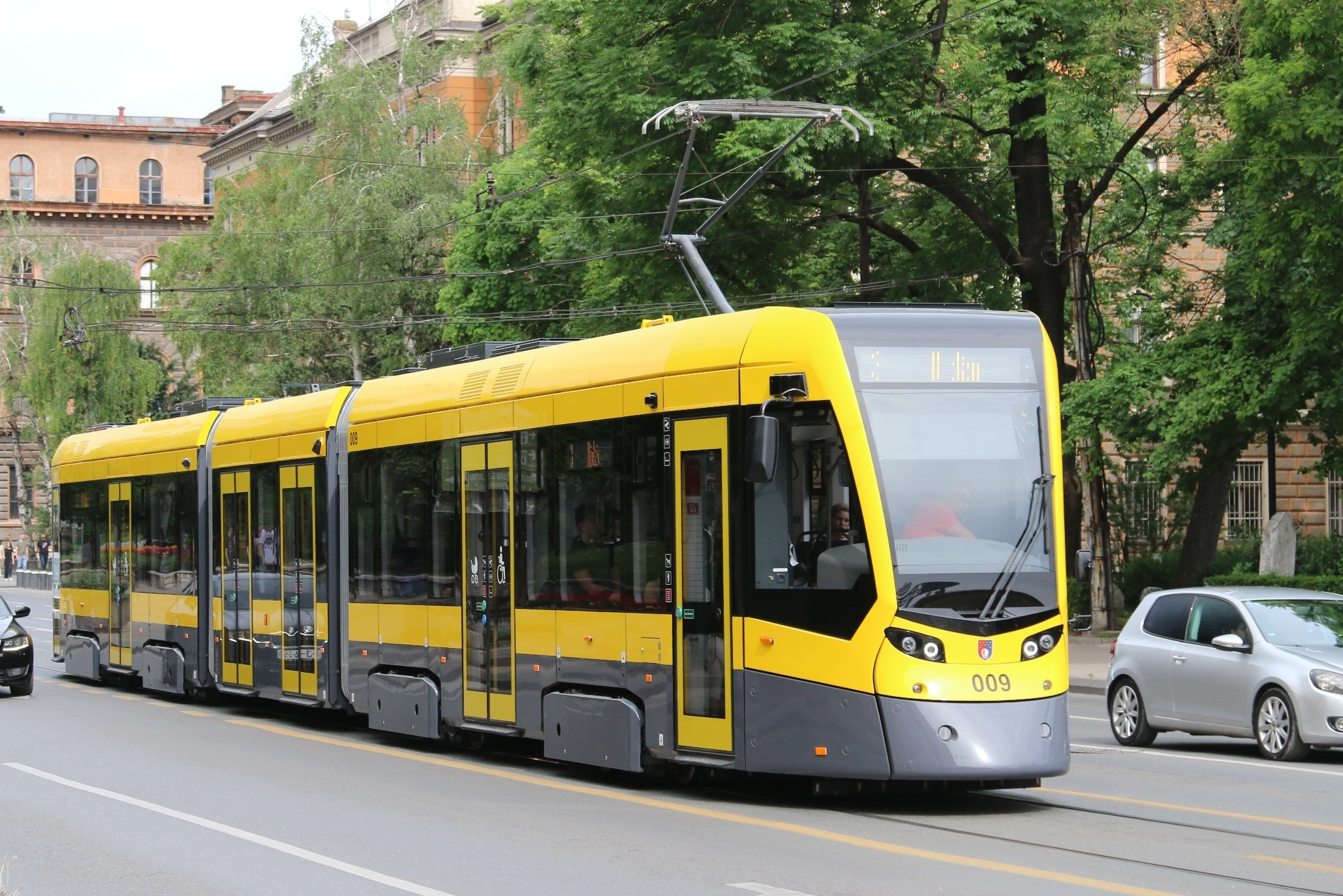
Tango in Sarajevo

== See also ==
- Variobahn, a 100% low-floor tram from the same manufacturer
