= St. Gallen–Trogen railway =

Railway line in Switzerland

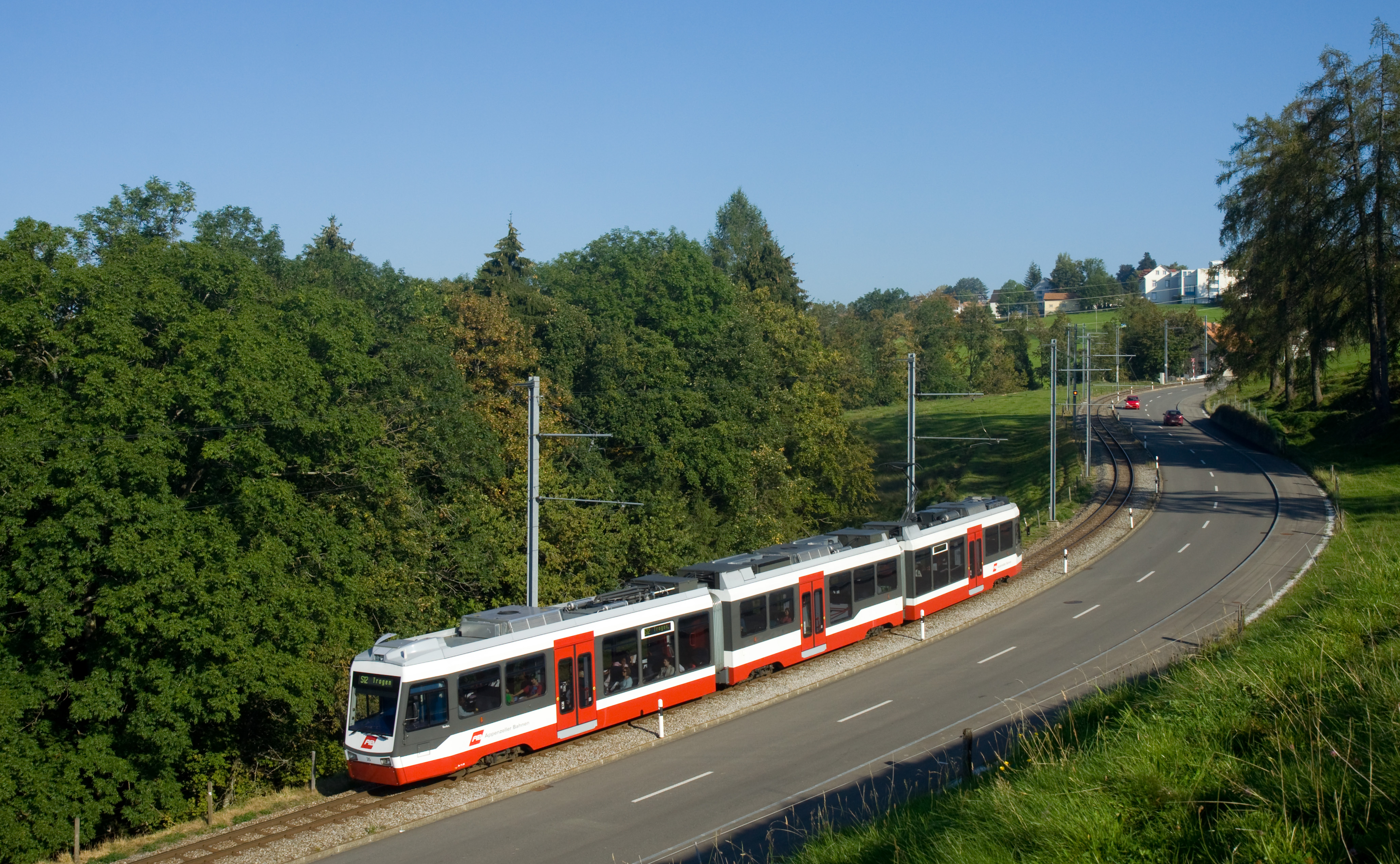

Overview
- Native name: Trogenerbahn
- Status: Operational
- Owner: Appenzell Railways

Service
- System: St. Gallen S-Bahn
- Route number: 859 (earlier: 115a)

Technical
- Line length: 9.8 kilometres (6.1 mi)
- Number of tracks: Mixture of single and double track
- Track gauge: 1,000 mm (3 ft 3 3/8 in) metre gauge
- Electrification: 600 V DC; 1500 (previously 1000) V DC
- Maximum incline: 7.6%

The St. Gallen–Trogen railway, or Trogenerbahn (TB), is a 9.8 kilometres (6.1 mi) long railway line in Switzerland. It links the city of St. Gallen, in the canton of St. Gallen, with Speicher and Trogen, both in the canton of Appenzell Ausserrhoden. Passenger service on the line now forms part of the St. Gallen S-Bahn, branded as the S21.

The line was opened in 1903, and was built as an interurban. Whilst much of the line has been upgraded, this is still apparent in the long stretches of roadside track, and in its exit from St. Gallen over street track. With a gradient of 7.6%, it is the steepest narrow-gauge adhesion railway in Switzerland.

The line is owned and operated by the Appenzell Railways company, which also operates several other railway lines in the two Appenzell cantons. It has been operated as part of the Appenzell–St. Gallen–Trogen railway since 6 October 2018.

== History ==
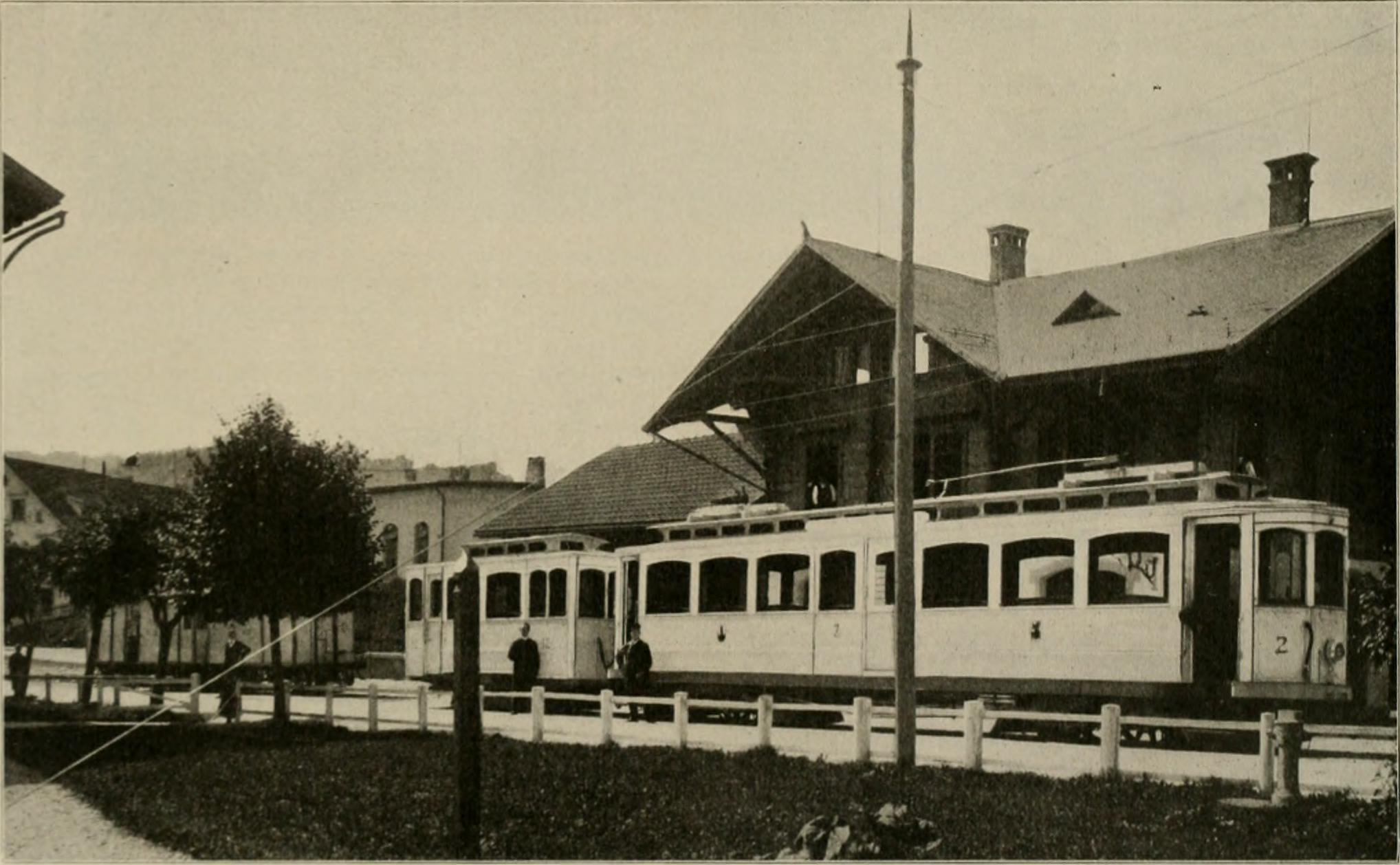
Train of the Trogen Railway in Speicher shortly after the opening of the line

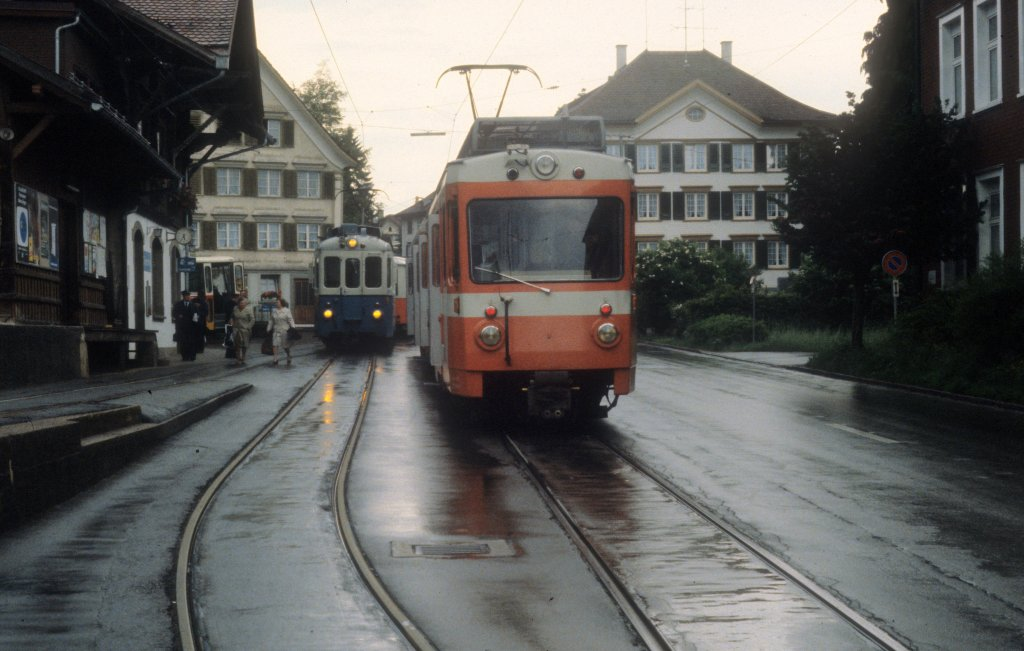
Two trains crossing in Speicher in June 1980

The St. Gallen–Trogen railway (Trogenerbahn, TB) was opened on 10 July 1903. Originally, the line was electrified at 750 volts DC. The voltage was increased to 900 volts in 1921 and finally to 1000 volts in 1928 with the replacement of the converter group in Speicher by a fully automatic mercury vapour rectifier plant. In the city of St. Gallen, the trains ran on the tracks of the St. Gallen Tramway, which was closed in 1957. Because of the intersections with the city trolleybuses, the contact wire voltage is still only 600 volts.

Despite the modest length of its operations, the Trogen Railway has been preserved. The line, which originally ran almost completely on track laid on roads, has been largely moved over the years to its own route. With a gradient of up to 7.6%, the Trogen Railway was the steepest narrow-gauge adhesion line in Switzerland prior to the opening of the Ruckhalde Tunnel.

In 2006 the company was merged into the Appenzell Railways. Since the opening of the St Gallen cross-city line on 6 October 2018, it has been operated as part of the Appenzell–St. Gallen–Trogen railway.

== Operation ==
=== Route ===
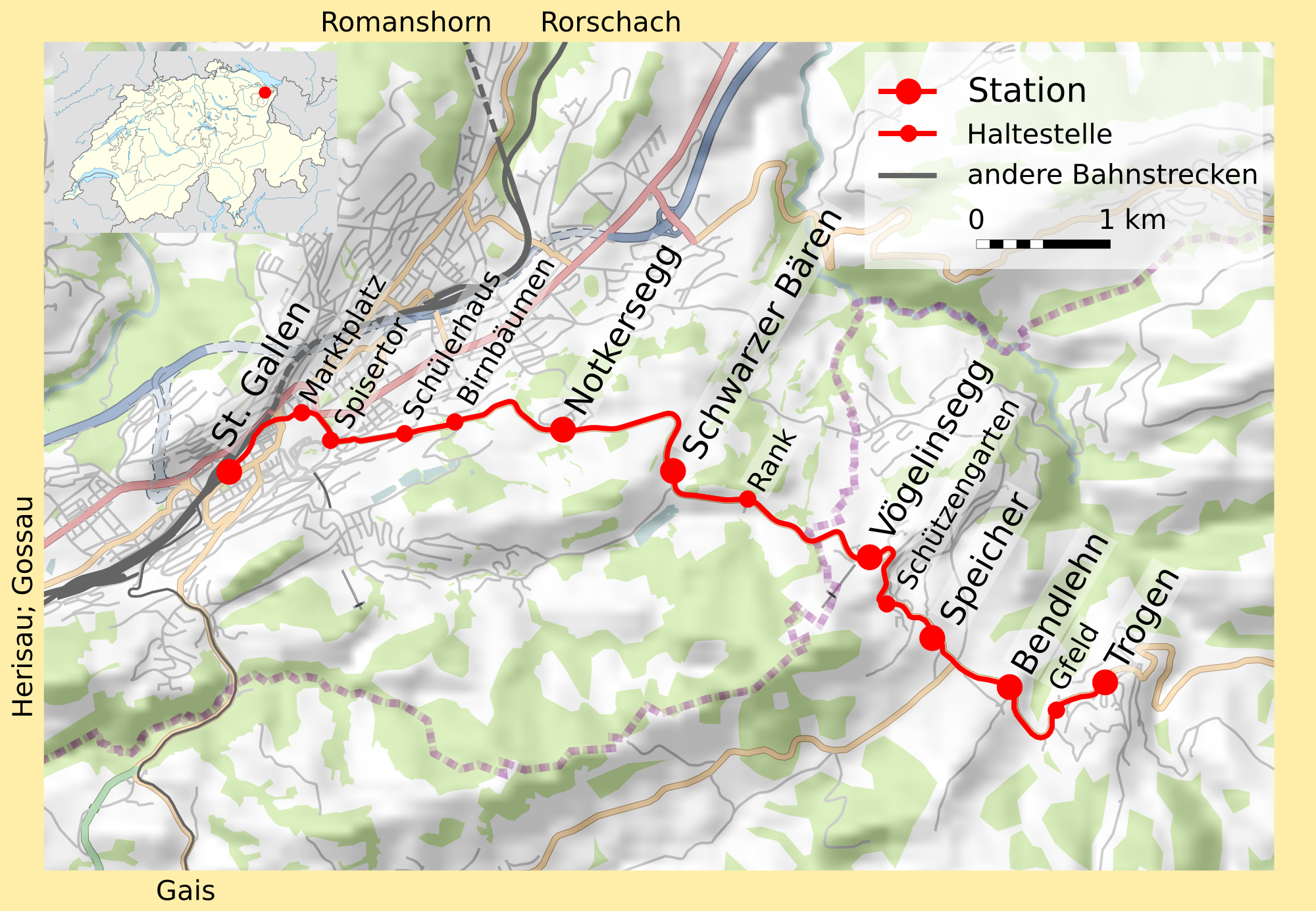
Map of the line

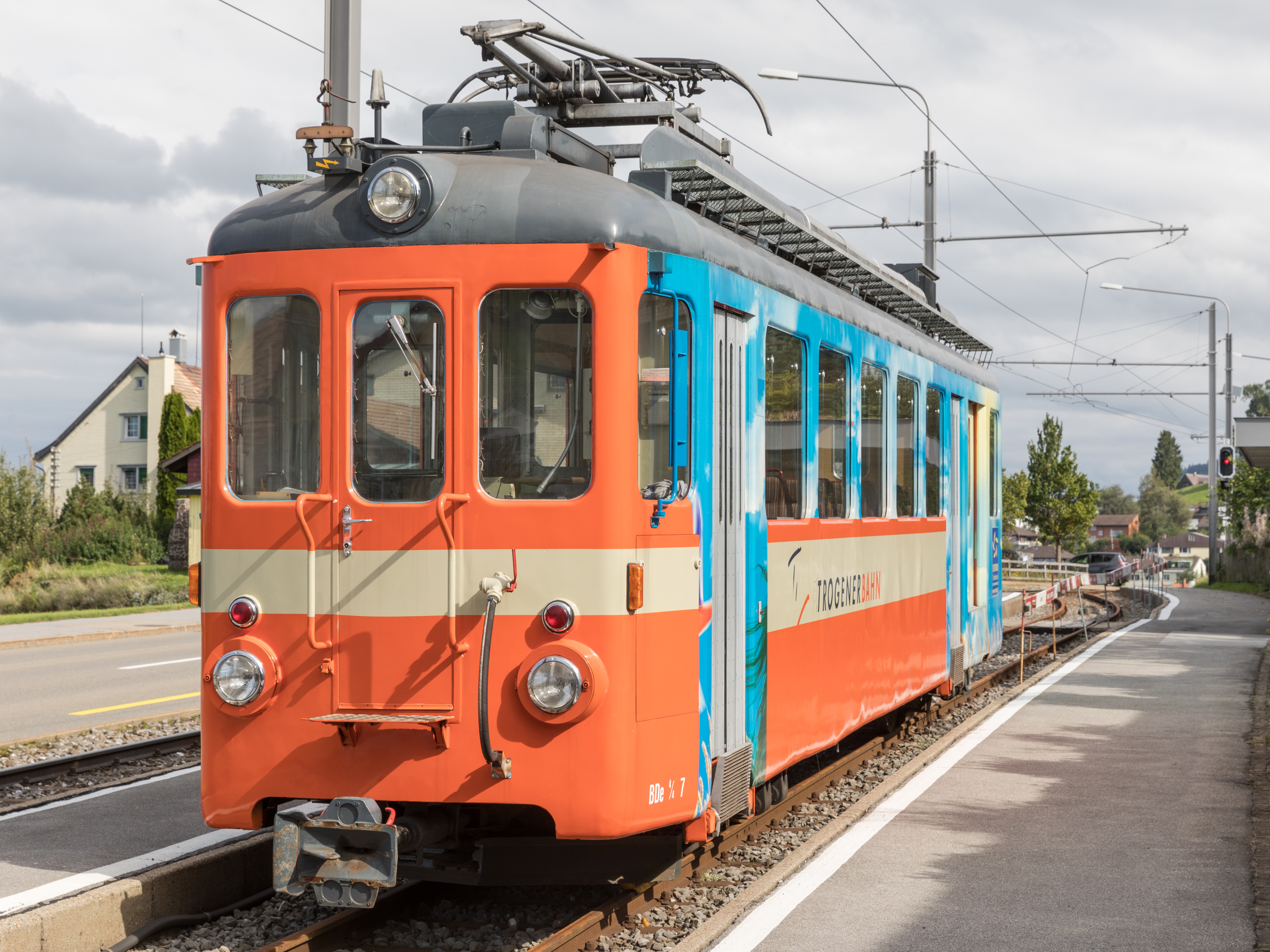
BDe 4/4 Nr. 7, electric railcar made in 1952

The line commences at St. Gallen railway station, where it shares a platform, but not tracks, with the St. Gallen–Gais–Appenzell railway line that is also owned and operated by the Appenzell Railways company. After leaving this platform, the Trogen line runs onto the street in front of the main station building. Now running on double track, it runs through the city streets for some 1.75 kilometres (1.09 mi), sharing its route for much of the way with routes of the city's trolleybus system that replaced the city tramway. There are three intermediate stops on this street section, at Marktplatz, Spisertor and Schülerhaus. Shortly after the latter stop, the track switches to a single-track alignment alongside the road to Trogen, an alignment it maintains all the way to its terminus, albeit with several intermediate passing loops.

From this point, the line affords views to the north over St. Gallen. Initially the lines runs on the northern side of the road, passing through the stops of Birnbäumen, Notkersegg, Schwarzer Bären and Rank. Once past the latter stop, the views to the north expand to include Lake Constance. The next stop is Vögelinsegg, after which the line crosses the road on a level crossing, before stopping at Schützengarten and Speicher, where the line's depot is located. Further stops at Bendlehn and Gfeld precede the terminus at Trogen.

The line is 9.8 kilometres (6.1 mi) in length, has a track gauge of 1,000 mm (3 ft 3 3/8 in) and a maximum gradient of 7.6%, and is electrified using an overhead line for current supply. On the street track section within the city of St. Gallen, where the railway's overhead line shares the street with that of the city's trolleybuses, the railway uses the same 600 V DC supply as the trolleybuses. Once on its own right-of-way, a 1,000 V DC supply was formerly used. Since the opening of the St Gallen cross-city line on 6 October 2018, the section of the line that was electrified at 1,000 V DC has been electrified at 1,500 V DC.

=== Services ===
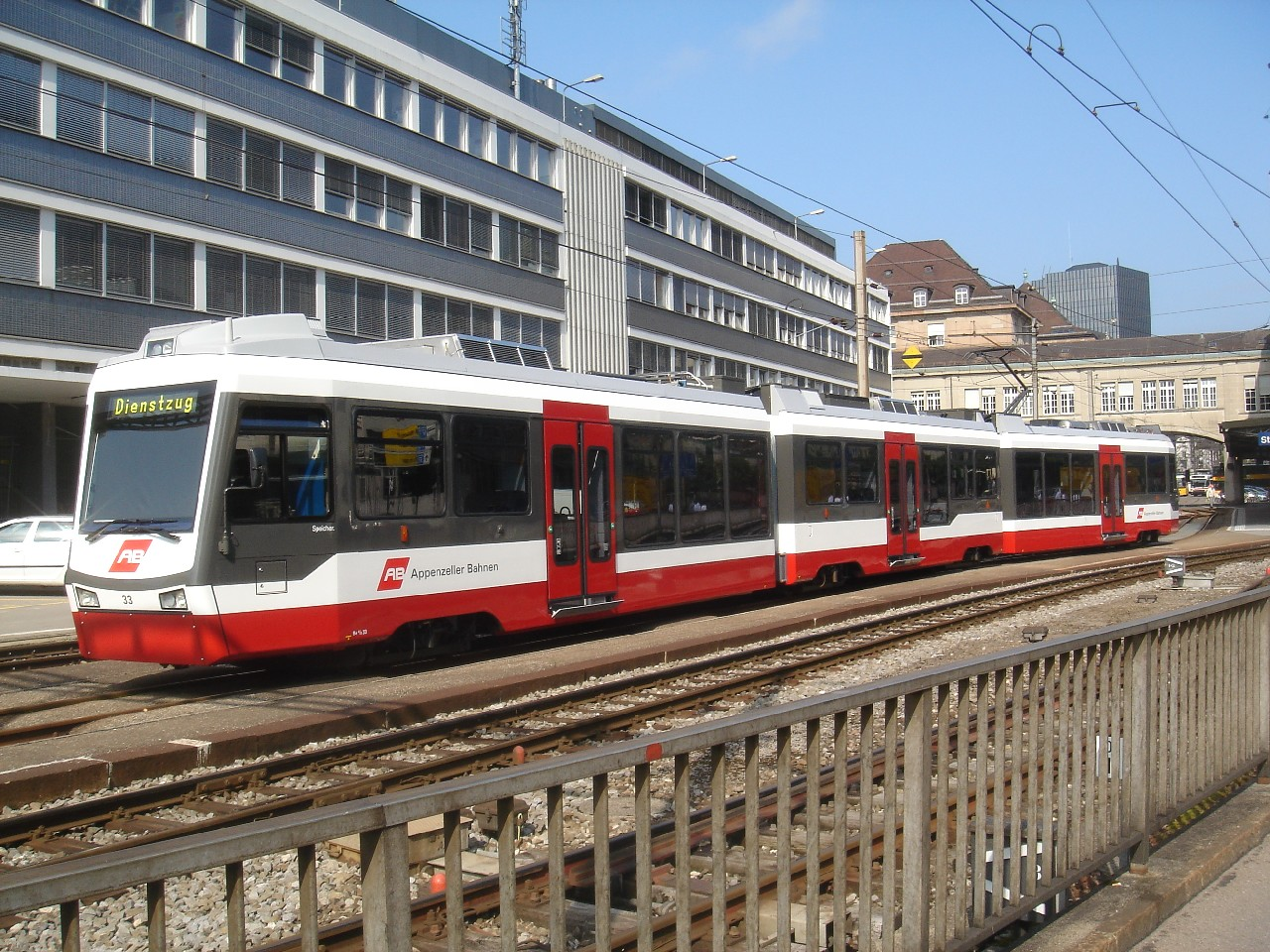
One of the line's Be4/8 units at St. Gallen station

Services are now operated as part of the Appenzell–St. Gallen–Trogen railway.

From Trogen a postbus connects with the upper station of the Rorschach–Heiden railway, also owned by the Appenzell Railways, at Heiden.
