= Teufen AR Stofel railway station =

Train station in the canton of Appenzell Ausserrhoden, Switzerland

Teufen AR Stofel
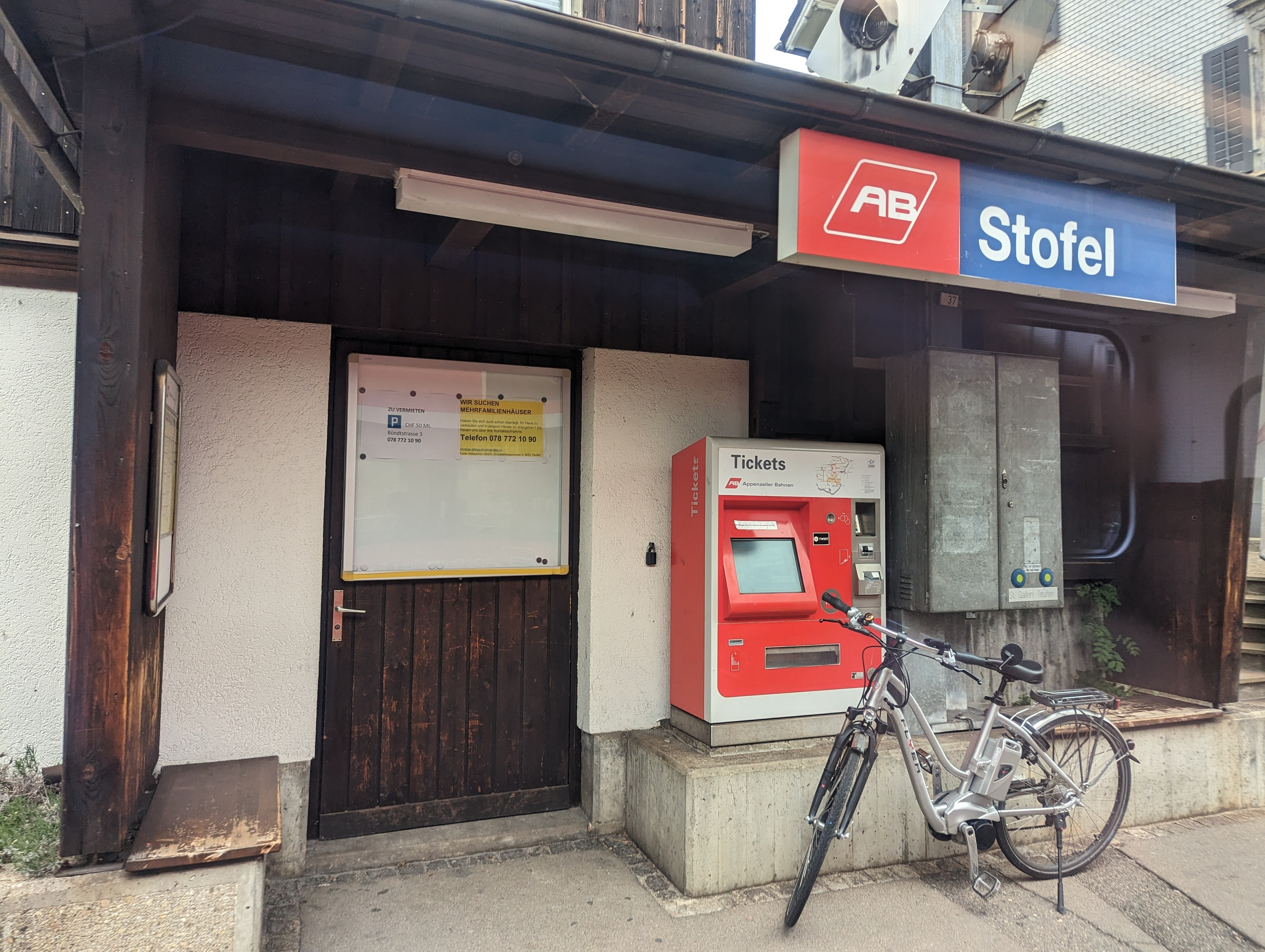
- Stofel Railway Station

General information
- Other names: Stofel
- Location: Teufen; Canton of Appenzell Ausserrhoden, Switzerland
- Coordinates: 47°23′28″N 9°22′48″E
- Elevation: 836 m (2,743 ft)
- Lines: Appenzell–St. Gallen–Trogen railway; (St. Gallen-Gais-Appenzell railway until 2018)
- Platforms: 1 side platform
- Tracks: 1
- Train operators: Appenzell Railways
- Connections
- Bus: PostAuto bus route 181

Other information
- Fare zone: 211 (Tarifverbund Ostwind)

Services
Preceding station	St. Gallen S-Bahn	Following station
Sternen bei Teufen towards Appenzell	S21	Teufen AR towards Trogen
Sternen bei Teufen towards Teufen AR	S22	Teufen AR towards Trogen
Location
- Location within Switzerland Location within Canton of Appenzell Ausserrhoden

Teufen AR Stofel station, or Stofel station, is a railway station in the municipality of Teufen, in the canton of Appenzell Ausserrhoden (AR), Switzerland. It is located along Hauptstrasse on the 1,000 mm (3 ft 3 3/8 in) Appenzell–St. Gallen–Trogen line of Appenzell Railways (Appenzeller Bahnen, AB), and is served by local light rail trains only.

== Services ==
Only S-Bahn services call at Teufen AR Stofel (stop only on request). As of the December 2024 timetable change, the station is served by the following services:

- St. Gallen S-Bahn:
  - S21: half-hourly service between Appenzell and Trogen, via St. Gallen.
  - S22: rush-hour service between Teufen AR and Trogen, via St. Gallen.

== See also ==
- Rail transport in Switzerland
