= Alfred Altherr =

Swiss Protestant clergyman

- Born: March 14, 1843; Grub, Canton of Appenzell Ausserrhoden, Switzerland
- Died: January 18, 1918 (aged 74); Basel, Switzerland
- Occupations: Protestant Clergyman; Writer
- Known for: First liberal pastor of Basel; Founder of the Basler Ferienversorgung; Exponent of church reform movement
- Spouse: Henriette Pfenninger
- Children: Paul Altherr; Alfred Johann Altherr; Heinrich Altherr
- Parents: Johannes Altherr; Anna Barbara (née Niederer)
- Awards: Honorary citizen of Basel; 1917: Honorary doctorate from the University of Basel

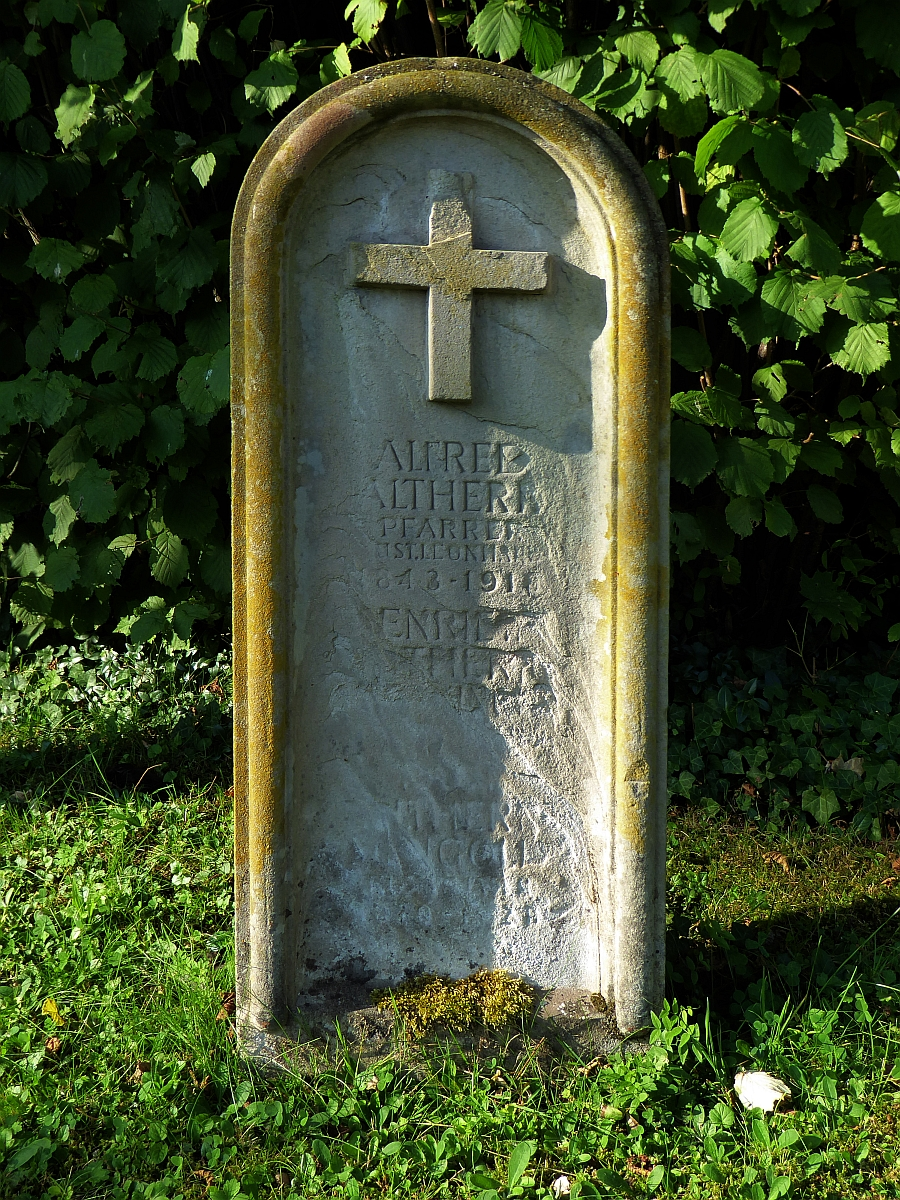
Alfred Altherr's tombstone in the Wolfgottesacker cemetery in Basel

Alfred Altherr (14 March 1843 in Grub – 18 January 1918 in Basel, entitled to reside in Speicher, honorary citizen of Basel) was a Swiss Protestant clergyman and writer from the canton of Appenzell Ausserrhoden.

== Life ==
Alfred Altherr was the son of the baker Johannes Altherr and his wife Anna Barbara (née Niederer), a hand embroiderer. He came from an impoverished family whose house was auctioned off in 1854 by order of the Poor Authorities. This led to the children being separated from the family and he was placed in an orphanage in Speicher; later his three sisters followed him. At the same time, Johann Heinrich Krüsi, who later became Thomas Alva Edison's assistant and with whom he had to do weaving work, was staying in the orphanage.

After the orphanage director changed, Alfred Altherr came to the canton school in Trogen in 1857 and took a preliminary course at the Swiss Federal Polytechnic in Zurich in 1862; He then studied theology at the University of Zurich.

He was ordained in Herisau in 1867 and was a pastor in Lichtensteig until 1871, then in Rorschach from 1871 to 1874 and in the Leonhardskirche in Basel from 1874 to 1911.

In 1878 he founded the Basler Ferienversorgung armer und erholungsbedürftiger Schulkinder (committee for holiday care for poor and needy school children) who were in need of relaxation. In 1917 he was awarded an honorary doctorate from the University of Basel. Alfred Altherr was buried in the Wolfgottesacker Cemetery in Basel.

== Family ==
Alfred Altherr married Henriette Pfenninger, daughter of Johann Heinrich Pfenninger, pastor in Laufen, in 1868. The names of their sons: Paul Altherr, Alfred Johann Altherr and Heinrich Altherr.

=== Spiritual engagement ===
Alfred Altherr was Basel's first liberal pastor and an exponent of the church reform movement, which advocated Christianity free from confession and dogma.

=== Literary works ===
Alfred Altherr wrote various books and worked as a founder and editor of magazines; from 1870 to 1876 he was the first editor of the Religiösen Volksblatt (Popular Religious Newspaper) and together with Emanuel Linder he founded the Schweizerisches Protestantenblatt (Swiss Protestant Newspaper) in 1878, of which he was editor until his death; from 1906 Hans Baur was co-publisher and editor. In addition to theological works, biographies, travelogues and stories, his memoirs are particularly noteworthy. Their first volume appeared in Zurich in 1897 under the title Beckenfridli. Geschichte eines armen Knaben (Beckenfridli. The story of a poor boy.)

== Trivia ==
In 1899, Alfred Altherr was the pastor to whom Emilie Kempin-Spyri applied in vain for a job as a maid. She was the first woman lawyer in Switzerland and was interned in the Friedmatt mental asylum in Basel.

== Honours and awards ==
- Honorary citizen of the city of Basel
- 1917: Honorary doctorate from the University of Basel

== Writings (extract) ==
- Antrittspredigt über 2. Mos. 3, 1–6: gehalten am 11. August 1867. Lichtensteig 1867.
- Die Kirche des neuen Bundes: Predigt den 3. Mai 1874 in der St. Martinskirche zu Basel. Basel 1874.
- Antrittspredigt gehalten in der St. Leonhardskirche zu Basel den 4. October 1874. Basel 1874.
- Die Bedeutung der Bibel für das religiöse, sittliche und soziale Leben: Ein Vortrag. Vereinsbuchdruckerei, Basel 1880.
- Theodor Hoffmann-Merian: ein Lebensbild nach seinen eigenen Aufzeichnungen. Schwabe, Basel 1889.
- Die Biblische Lehre. J. Frehner, Basel 1890.
- Theodor Parker in seinem Leben und Wirken dargestellt. St. Gallen 1894.
- Beckenfriedli. Zürich 1897.
- Alfred Bitzius, ein Vorbild freier Frömmigkeit: Vortrag. Frehner, Basel 1898.
- Das fatale Almosen: eine Erzählung. Haller, Bern 1898.
- Die Lehre vom Sohne Gottes für das Volk dargestellt. Schünemann, Bremen 1904.
- Friedrich von Schiller in seiner Bedeutung für die Religion. Volksschriftenverlag des Schweizerischen Vereins für freies Christentum, Druck: G. Böhm, Basel 1905.
- Die Kinder der Frau Schuhr: Eine Erzählung. Haller, Bern 1907.
- mit Theodor Wiget: Unsere Erfahrung und unser Glaube. Heiden 1908.
- Ein Abschiedswort von Pfarrer Alfred Altherr an seine Gemeinde und Freunde. Frick, Zürich 1911.
- Vaterworte auf deine Lebensreise: Zum Andenken an die Konfirmation für Töchter. Beer, Zürich 1915.

== Literature ==
- Ernst H. Koller und Jakob Signer: Appenzellisches Wappen- und Geschlechterbuch. Stämpfli, Bern 1926, S. 7.
- Klaus Otte: Alfred Altherr. In: Der Reformation verpflichtet. Gestalten und Gestalter in Stadt und Landschaft Basel aus fünf Jahrhunderten. Herausgegeben vom Kirchenrat der Evangelisch-reformierten Kirche Basel-Stadt. Merian, Basel 1979, S. 131–136.
