= Teufen, Appenzell Ausserrhoden =

Teufen
- Municipality
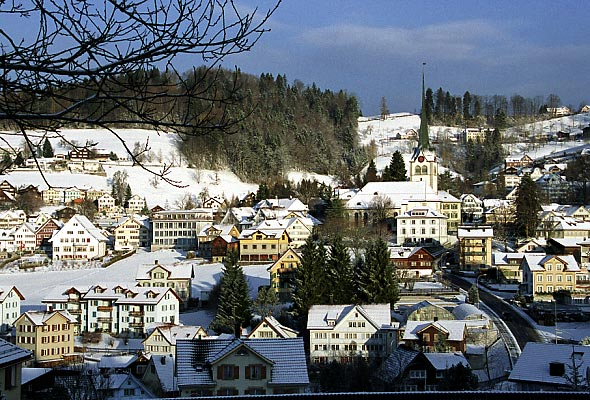

- Coat of arms
- Location of Teufen
- Location within Switzerland Location within Canton of Appenzell Ausserrhoden
- Coordinates: 47°23′N 9°23′E
- Country: Switzerland
- Canton: Appenzell Ausserrhoden
- District: n.a.

Area
  - Total: 15.25 km^{2} (5.89 sq mi)
- Elevation: 837 m (2,746 ft)

Population (December 2008)
  - Total: 5,766
  - Density: 378.1/km^{2} (979.3/sq mi)
- Time zone: UTC+01:00 (CET)
  - Summer (DST): UTC+02:00 (CEST)
- Postal code: 9053
- SFOS number: 3024
- ISO 3166 code: CH-AR
- Surrounded by: Bühler, St. Gallen (SG), Schlatt-Haslen (AI), Speicher, Stein
- Website: www.teufen.ch

Teufen is a municipality in the canton of Appenzell Ausserrhoden in Switzerland.

== History ==
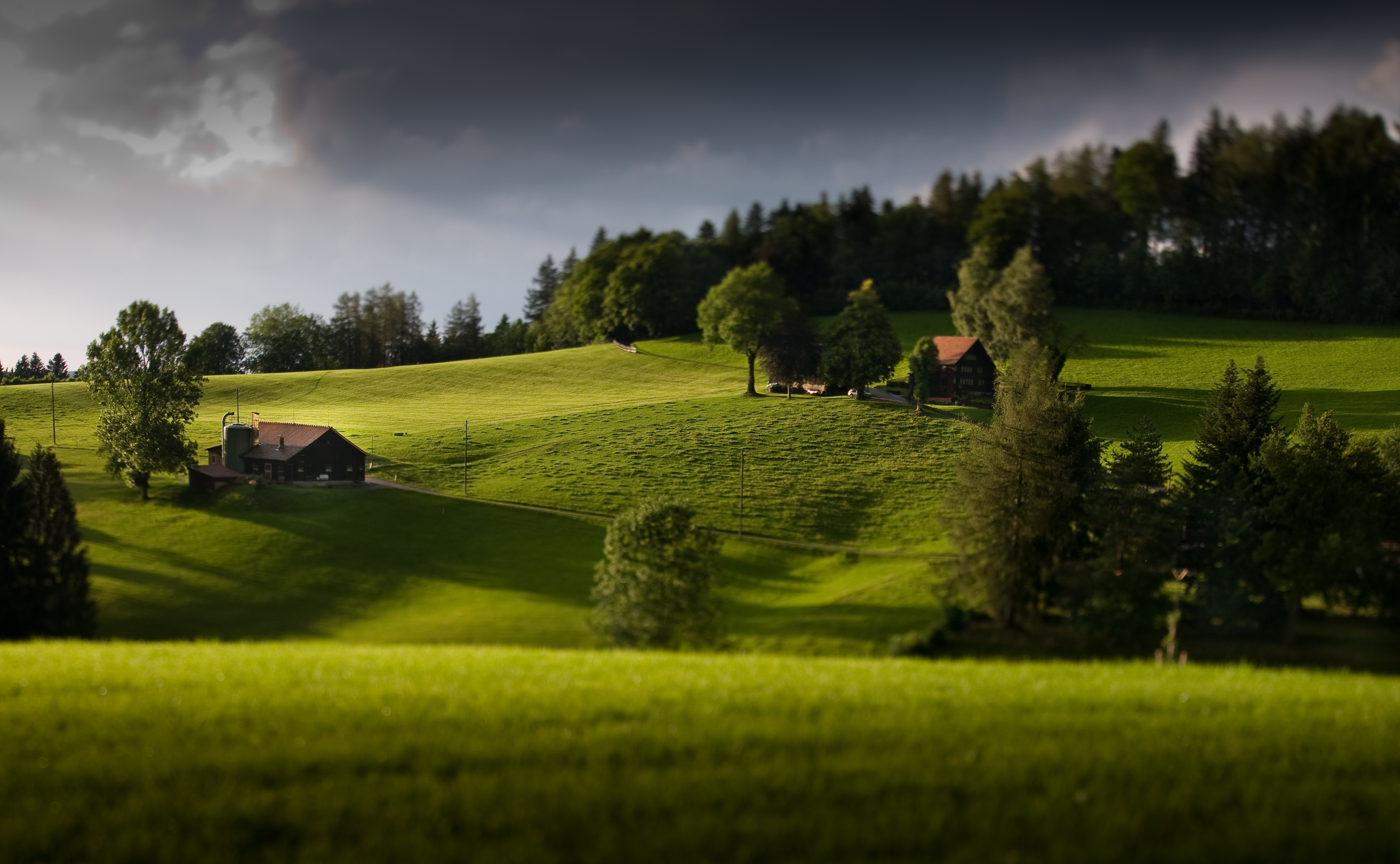
Countryside of Teufen

Teufen (Tiuffen) was first mentioned in 1272. By 1300 the place consisted of only five farms. In 1525 the assembly ruled that each parish could decide whether or not to remain Catholic. This led to the division of Appenzell in 1597. While the town of Teufen adopted the new protestant faith, Wonnenstein Friary remained Roman Catholic. In 1870 the Friary grounds were declared an exclave of Appenzell Innerrhoden.

In 1841 Teufen offered their new school building as a present to attract the government of the canton. The assembly refused the present.

Weaving was important in Teufen. Around 1820 a new loom was invented in Teufen, allowing embroidery in one go. This led to a boom in embroidery, particularly between 1880 and 1890.

== Heritage sites of national significance ==
The Gmündertobel Bridge (shared with Stein, Appenzell), and the Wattbach Bridge (shared with Stein and St. Gallen) are listed as heritage sites of national significance.

== Geography ==
Aerial view from 400 m (1,300 ft) by Walter Mittelholzer (1923)

As of 2019, Teufen has an area of 15.3 km^{2} (5.9 sq mi). Of this area, 55.4% is used for agricultural purposes, while 29.8% is forested. Of the rest of the land, 14% is settled (buildings or roads) and the remainder (0.8%) is non-productive (rivers, glaciers or mountains).

Wonnenstein Friary in Teufen is an exclave of Appenzell Innerrhoden.

== Weather ==
Teufen has an average of 154.2 days of rain per year and on average receives 1,552 mm (61.1 in) of precipitation. The wettest month is June during which time Teufen receives an average of 191 mm (7.5 in) of precipitation. During this month there is precipitation for an average of 15.1 days. The month with the most days of precipitation is May, with an average of 15.2, but with only 164 mm (6.5 in) of precipitation. The driest month of the year is February with an average of 88 mm (3.5 in) of precipitation over 15.1 days.

== Demographics ==
Teufen has a population (as of 2008) of 5,766, of which about 10.0% are foreign nationals. Over the last 10 years the population has grown at a rate of 6.8%. Most of the population (as of 2000) speaks German (93.4%), with Italian being second most common ( 1.3%) and Spanish being third ( 0.9%).

As of 2000, the gender distribution of the population was 48.5% male and 51.5% female. The age distribution, as of 2000, in Teufen is; 409 people or 7.4% of the population are between 0–6 years old. 586 people or 10.6% are 6-15, and 248 people or 4.5% are 16–19. Of the adult population, 247 people or 4.5% of the population are between 20–24 years old. 1,544 people or 27.9% are 25–44, and 1,430 people or 25.8% are 45–64. The senior population distribution is 751 people or 13.6% of the population are between 65–79 years old, and 320 people or 5.8% are over 80.

In the 2007 federal election, the FDP received 72.9% of the vote.

In Teufen about 79.7% of the population (between age 25-64) have completed either non-mandatory upper secondary education or additional higher education (either university or a Fachhochschule).

Teufen has an unemployment rate of 1.27%. As of 2005, there were 136 people employed in the primary economic sector and about 66 businesses involved in this sector. 657 people are employed in the secondary sector and there are 79 businesses in this sector. 1,463 people are employed in the tertiary sector, with 266 businesses in this sector.

The historical population is given in the following table:

Historical population
Year	Pop.	±%
1980	5,027	—
1990	5,252	+4.5%
2000	5,630	+7.2%
2005	5,622	−0.1%
2007	5,696	+1.3%

== Transport ==
Teufen is located on the meter gauge Appenzell–St. Gallen–Trogen railway line, which is operated by Appenzell Railways (Appenzeller Bahnen, AB) for St. Gallen S-Bahn (lines S20, S21, S22). There are five stations within the municipality: Lustmühle, Niederteufen, Sternen bei Teufen, Teufen AR and Teufen AR Stofel. Services link Teufen with St. Gallen railway station, which is served by national and international trains. The municipality is also served by PostAuto buses.

== Tritium production ==
Teufen is home to RC Tritec, a company that provides Tritium and other radioactive isotopes to industry. Until 2008 they provided luminous Tritium compounds for the Swiss watch industry, but they have replaced radioactive Tritium with non-radioactive Super-LumiNova. Tritium emissions are tested every week and monitored by the Federal Government. In 2010 the waste water radiation levels reached a high of 16 GBq, which is still below the 20 GBq limit, due to construction activities. The 2011 waste water readings are only 2GBq.

== See also ==
- Null Stern Hotel
