= Josef Franz Karl Amrhyn =

Swiss politician (1800–1849)

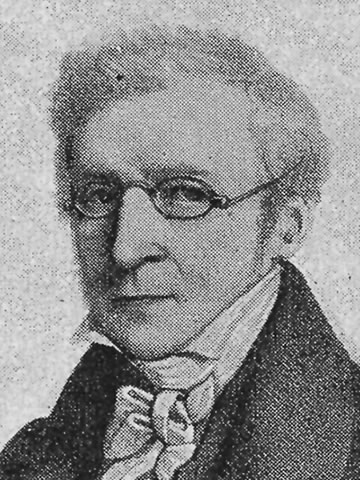

2nd Chancellor of Switzerland
- In office 1831–1847
- Preceded by: Jean-Marc Mousson
- Succeeded by: Johann Ulrich Schiess

Personal details
- Born: 11 February 1800 Lucerne, Switzerland
- Died: 7 April 1849 (aged 49) Lucerne, Switzerland
- Education: University of Göttingen; University of Freiburg; University of Paris

Josef Franz von Sales Johann Baptist Karl Nikolaus von Flüe Amrhyn (11 February 1800 in Lucerne, Switzerland – 7 April 1849), was a Swiss politician who served as the second Chancellor of Switzerland from 1831 to 1847.

== Biography ==
Son of former Diet President Josef Karl Amrhyn, he studied at the Pestalozzi school of the château Yverdon (1810-1812) and then at the gymnasium and lyceum of Lucerne before pursuing legal study at Göttingen, Freiburg im Breisgau, and Paris (1820-1823). In 1822, he joined the Old Freiburger fraternity.

He began his career as a private secretary to his father before being named deputy magistrate in Lucerne in 1824, where he would play a controversial role in the trial of the murder of Franz Xaver Keller. He then served as Secretary of State of the Confederation (1825-1830), then Chancellor of the Confederation on the proposal of his predecessor Jean-Marc Mousson from 1831 to 1847.

Catholic and moderately liberal, he was opposed to the objectives of the Sonderbund (an alliance of Roman Catholic cantons) and resigned in 1847 for his refusal to declare war against the coalition and therefore against the canton of his hometown, Lucerne. On 7 April 1849, his body was discovered in the River Reuss. The circumstances surrounding his death have never been elucidated.
