= Jean-Marc Mousson =

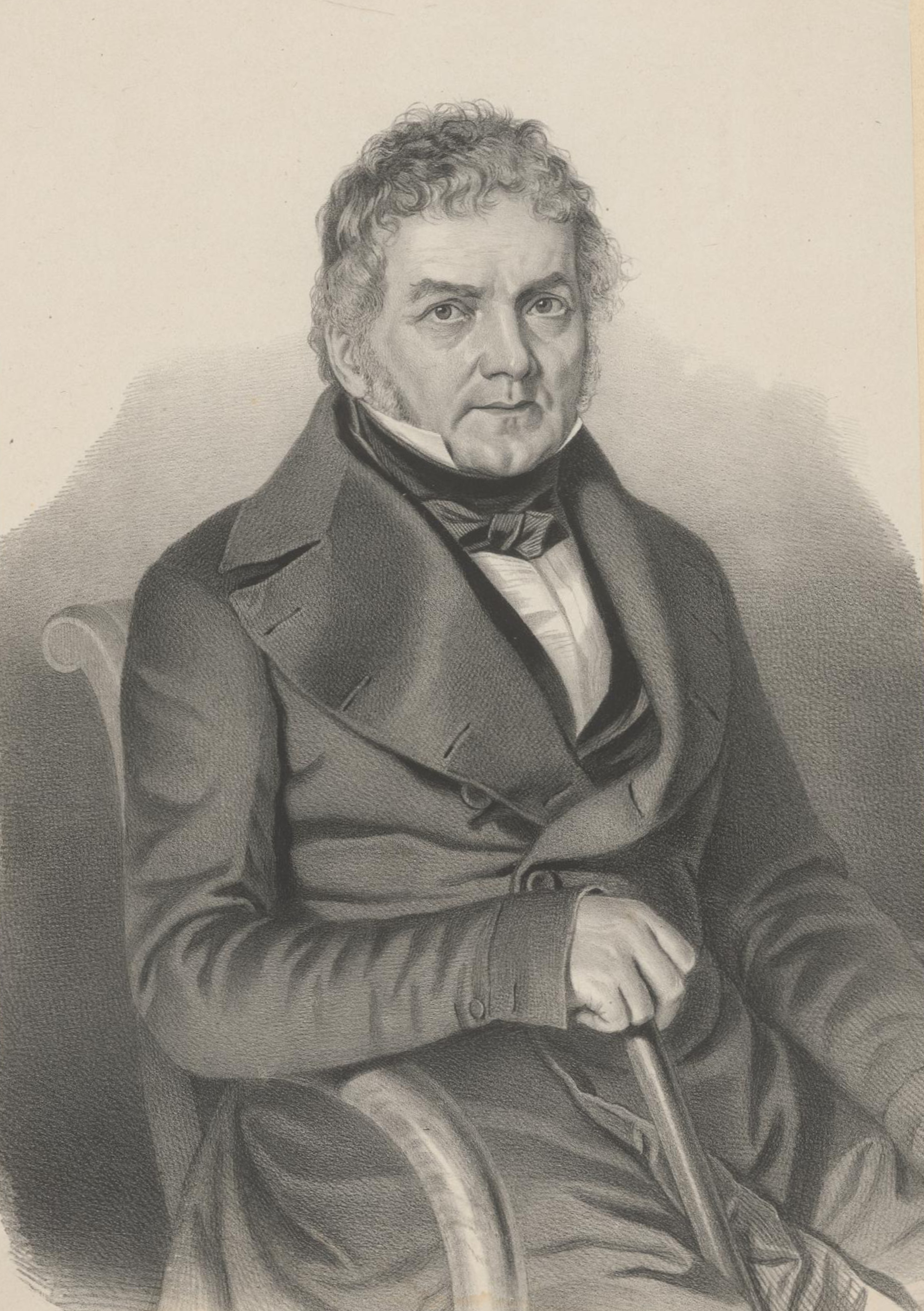
- (Lithography by Carl Friedrich Irminger; a. 1850)

1st Chancellor of Switzerland
- In office 1803–1830
- Preceded by: Position established
- Succeeded by: Josef Franz Karl Amrhyn

Personal details
- Born: 17 February 1776 Morges, Switzerland
- Died: 21 June 1861 (aged 85) Zürich, Switzerland
- Education: University of Tübingen

Jean-Marc Samuel Isaac Mousson (17 February 1776 – 21 June 1861) was a Swiss politician and civil servant. He was the first Chancellor of Switzerland from 1803 to 1830.

== Biography ==
Mousson was born on 17 February 1776 in Morges. the descendant of Huguenot refugees from Le Mas-d'Azil in the French County of Foix who took up refuge on the Vaud side of Lake Geneva, in Morges following the revocation of the Edict of Nantes by Louis XIV. His father was a reformed pastor. Mousson studied law at the Academy in Lausanne. He continued his studies at the University of Tübingen, where his obtained his doctorate in 1796. After the French invasion of Switzerland and the establishment of the Helvetic Republic, he took in January 1798 the position of deputy of Bursins in provisional meeting of the "Lemanischen Republic" in part and was its secretary.

The Directorate of the Helvetic Republic appointed Mousson in June 1798 to the post of Secretary-General. In 1803, he was appointed private secretary to Landammann Louis d'Affry. That same year, at only 27 years of age, he was elected to the Diet Chancellor of the Confederation; he was the first and youngest in Switzerland to reach this high office. Mousson was instrumental in the construction of the Federal Chancellery, the oldest permanent federal agency in Switzerland. He remained in that position until his retirement in 1830, successively passing through the period of the Act of Mediation (1803), as well as the Restoration.

From September 1833 to January 1834, he was part of the arbitral tribunal that legally regulated the separation of the canton of Basel. He then retired to Zürich where he continued to participate in federal political debate. During his career, he was appointed honorary citizen of Zürich (1816) and Bern (1821). He was also awarded the Order of St. Stephen of Hungary (1815) by Francis I, Emperor of Austria and the Red Eagle of Prussia (1817) by Frederick William IV of Prussia.

He spent the last 20 years of his life in Zürich, on "Zur Schonau", the property of his son Heinrich, overlooking the city.

His son Heinrich was State Secretary of the Confederation from 1830 to 1833. Heinrich married Régula Dorothea von Wyss, daughter of David von Wyss, mayor of Zürich. Heinrich would later serve as mayor of Zürich himself from 1840 to 1845, and subsequently as President of the Federal Diet.

In 2012, Mousson was honored in his hometown of Morges with a plaque bearing his name.
