= Grimmenstein monastery =

Grimmenstein
- Kloster Grimmenstein
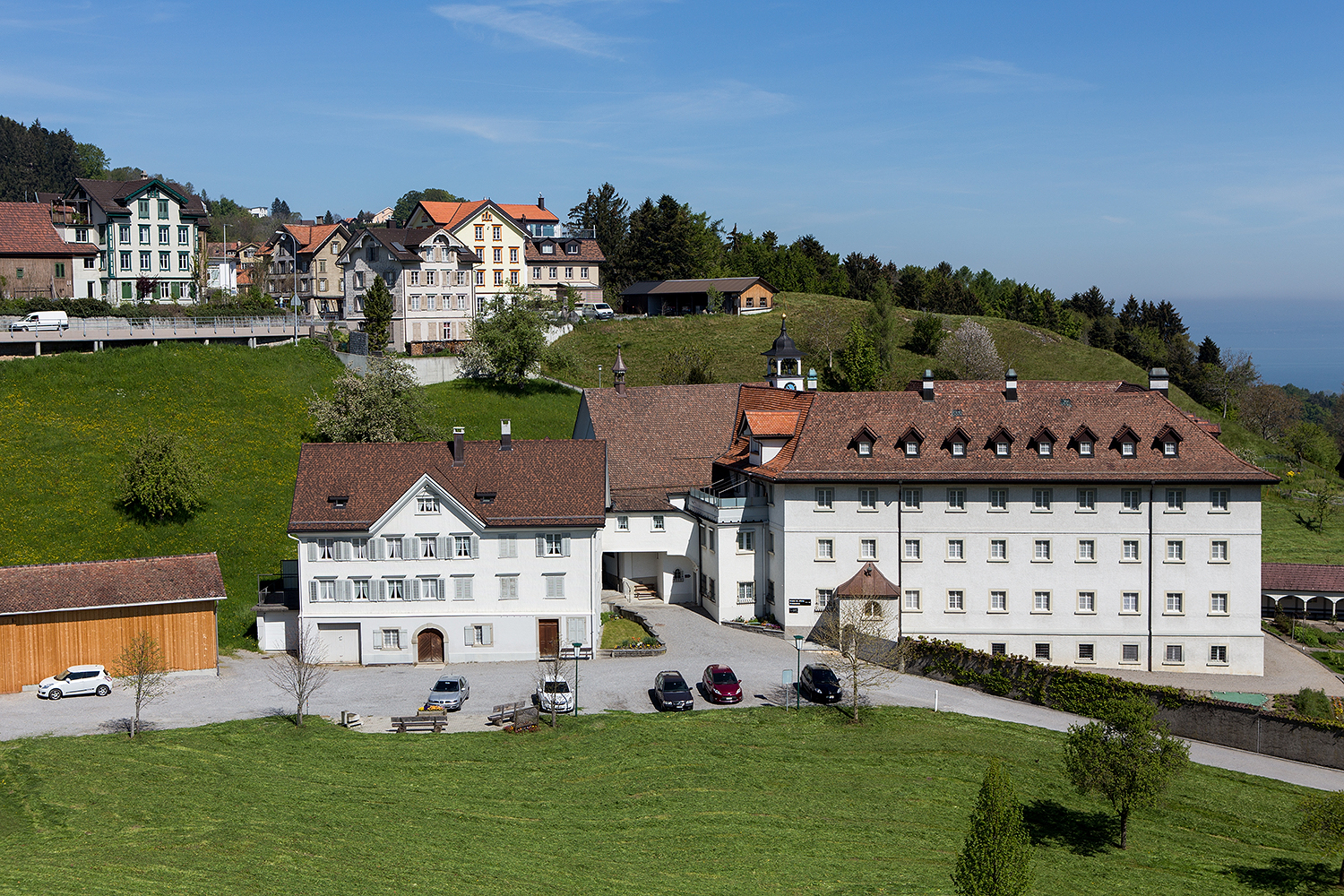

- Location within Canton of Appenzell Ausserrhoden Location within Switzerland
- Interactive map of Grimmenstein

Monastery information
- Full name: St. Ottilia, Grimmenstein
- Order: Third Order of Saint Francis
- Denomination: Roman Catholic
- Established: 1378/1424
- Diocese: Saint Gallen

Site
- Location: Walzenhausen
- Country: Switzerland
- Coordinates: 47°26′36.24″N 9°36′45.72″E

Grimmenstein Monastery is a monastery of Sisters of the Third Order of Saint Francis in Walzenhausen in the canton of Appenzell Ausserrhoden in Switzerland. While it is located in Appenzell Ausserrhoden, the buildings and grounds are a small exclave of the canton of Appenzell Innerrhoden.

== History ==
By 1378 a group of Beguines existed at Äschach farm in the area. In 1424 the Abbot of Saint Gall Kuno von Stoffeln allowed a monastery for the laywomen to be built near the ruins of Grimmenstein Castle. By 1593 they were living under the Rule of Saint Francis. In 1549 the monastery building was destroyed in a fire. It was rebuilt soon thereafter. In 1604 they adopted the Pfanneregger Reform as a Capuchin friary.

In 1597 the Canton of Appenzell split into the Catholic Appenzell Innerrhoden and the Protestant Appenzell Ausserrhoden half-cantons. Because Grimmenstein was located in the town of Walzenhausen, which elected to join the protestant Ausserrhoden, the ownership of the monastery became a source of conflict. In 1870 the federal government declared that the land within the walls of Wonnenstein Friary and Grimmenstein monastery would be part of Appenzell Innerrhoden and everything outside the walls would be Appenzell Ausserrhoden.

They established the daughter friary in Nevada in the United States. Beginning in 1953 the monastery church became the parish church for Walzenhausen. In 1794 there were 14 residents of the friary. In 1940 that number was 45. In 1991 there were 21 residents and by 2001 that number had dropped to 15.
