= Wonnenstein Friary =

Monastery in Switzerland

Wonnenstein
- Mariä Rosengarten Wonnenstein
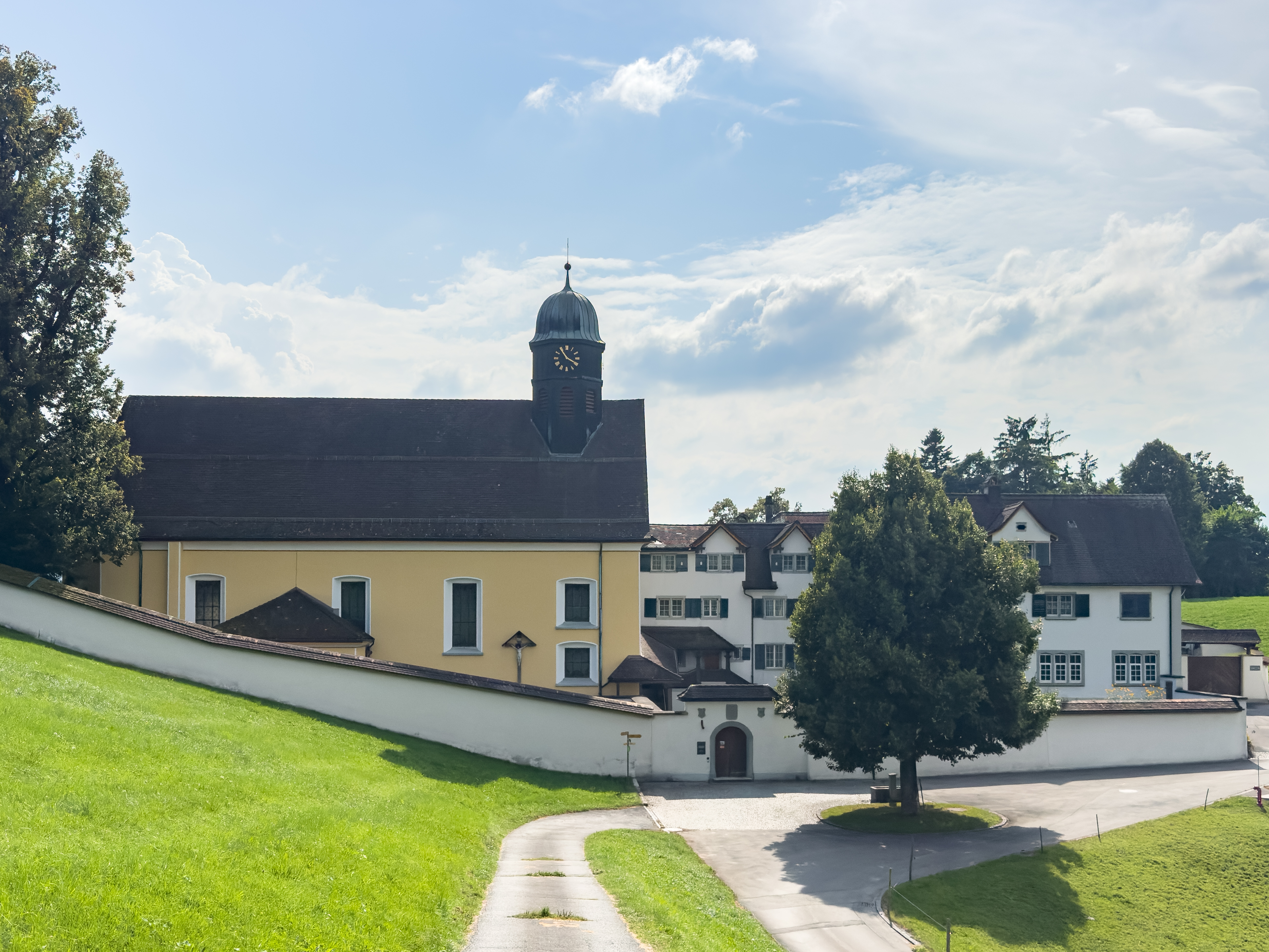

- Location within Canton of Appenzell Ausserrhoden Location within Switzerland
- Interactive map of Wonnenstein

Monastery information
- Order: Third Order of Saint Francis
- Denomination: Roman Catholic
- Established: 1381
- Diocese: Saint Gallen

Site
- Location: Teufen
- Country: Switzerland
- Coordinates: 47.386667°N 9.362778°E

Wonnenstein Friary or Mary's Rose Garden Wonnenstein is a monastery of Sisters of the Third Order of Saint Francis in Teufen in the canton of Appenzell Ausserrhoden in Switzerland. While it is located in Appenzell Ausserrhoden, the buildings and grounds are a small exclave of the canton of Appenzell Innerrhoden.

== History ==
In 1381 Kuno von Stoffeln, the Abbot of Saint Gallen, granted the land where the friary now stands to several nuns who lived in the area. By the 15th century they were living under the Rule of Saint Francis. During the Protestant Reformation the residents left the monastery. In 1596 Anna Wäspi von Jonschwil was sent from Pfanneregg monastery by Wattwil to reestablish Wonnenstein under the Pfanneregger Reform as a Capuchin friary. In 1597 the Canton of Appenzell split into the Catholic Appenzell Innerrhoden and the Protestant Appenzell Ausserrhoden half-cantons. Because Wonnestein was located in the town of Teufen, which joined the protestant Ausserrhoden, ownership of the friary became a source of conflict. In 1870 the federal government declared that the land within the walls of Wonnenstein and Grimmenstein would be part of Appenzell Innerrhoden and everything outside the walls would be Appenzell Ausserrhoden.

Beginning in 1634 the sisters had a permanent resident confessor who initially came from Reichenau Abbey and then from Fischingen Abbey. Starting in 1890 the confessor came from Engelberg Abbey. The friary had 22 residents in 1616 and in 1938 it housed 47. In 2000 that number had dropped to 11. Following the death in January 2020 of Gabriela Hug there were only two residents left at Wonnenstein.

== Gallery ==
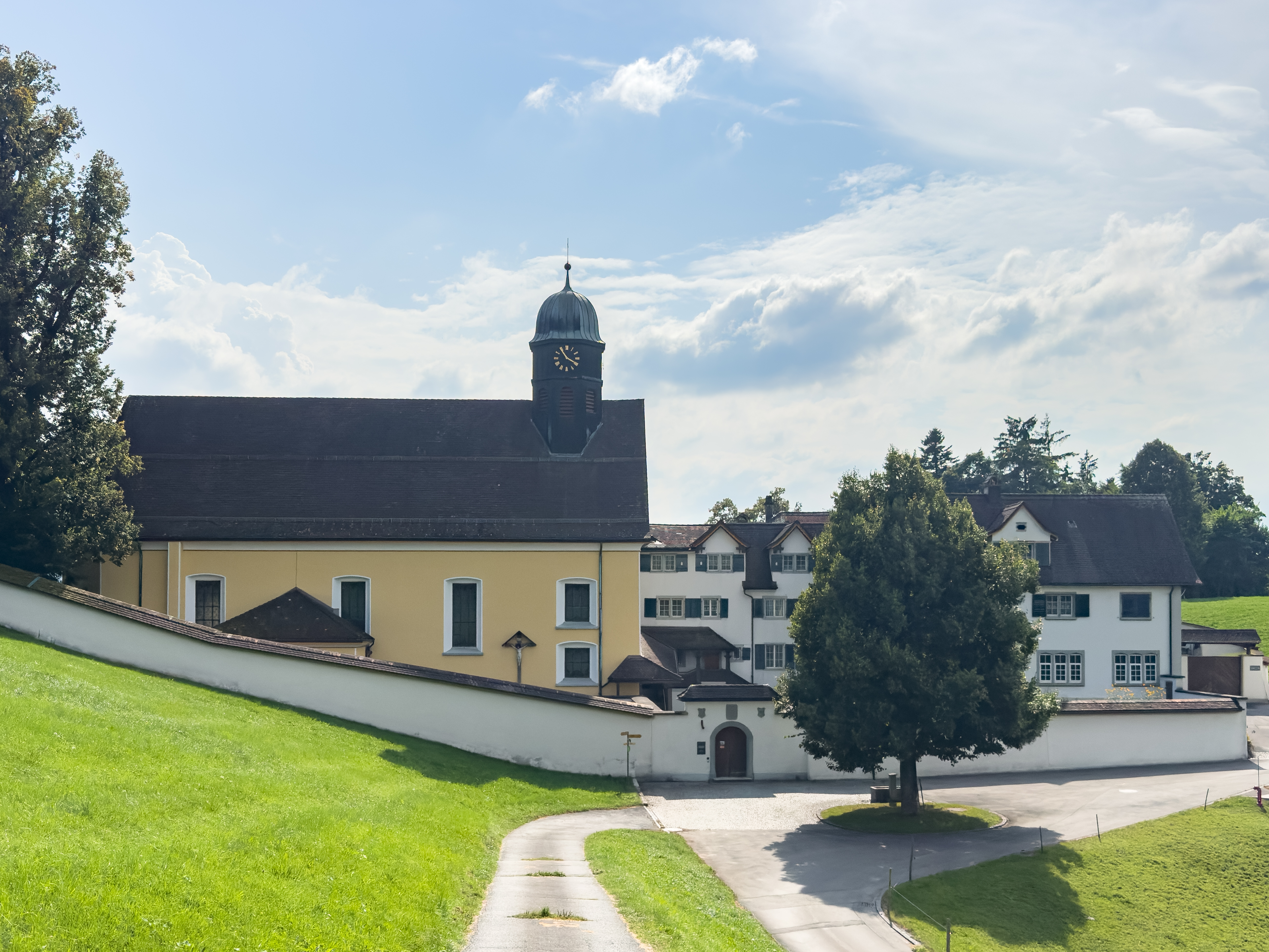

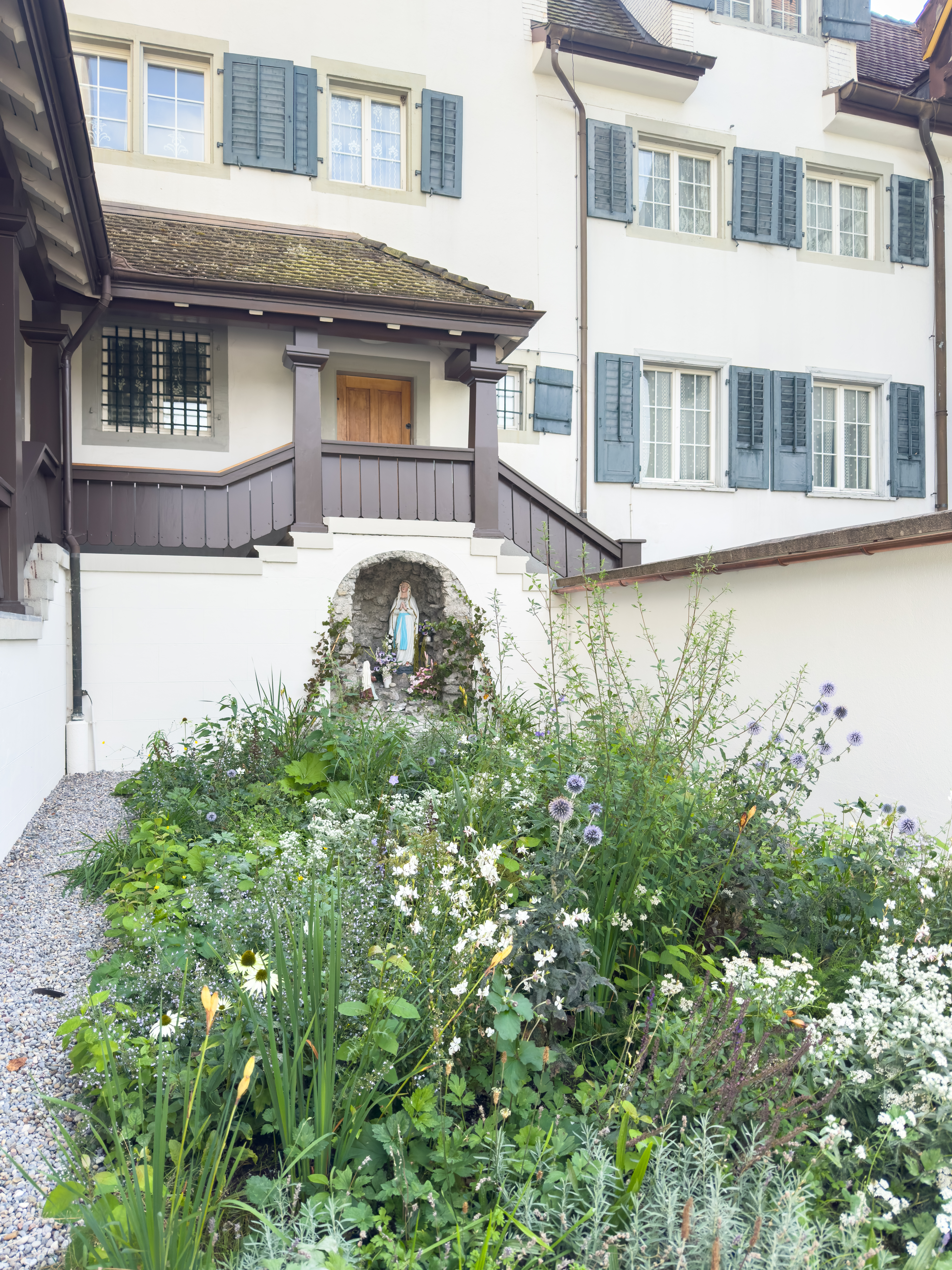

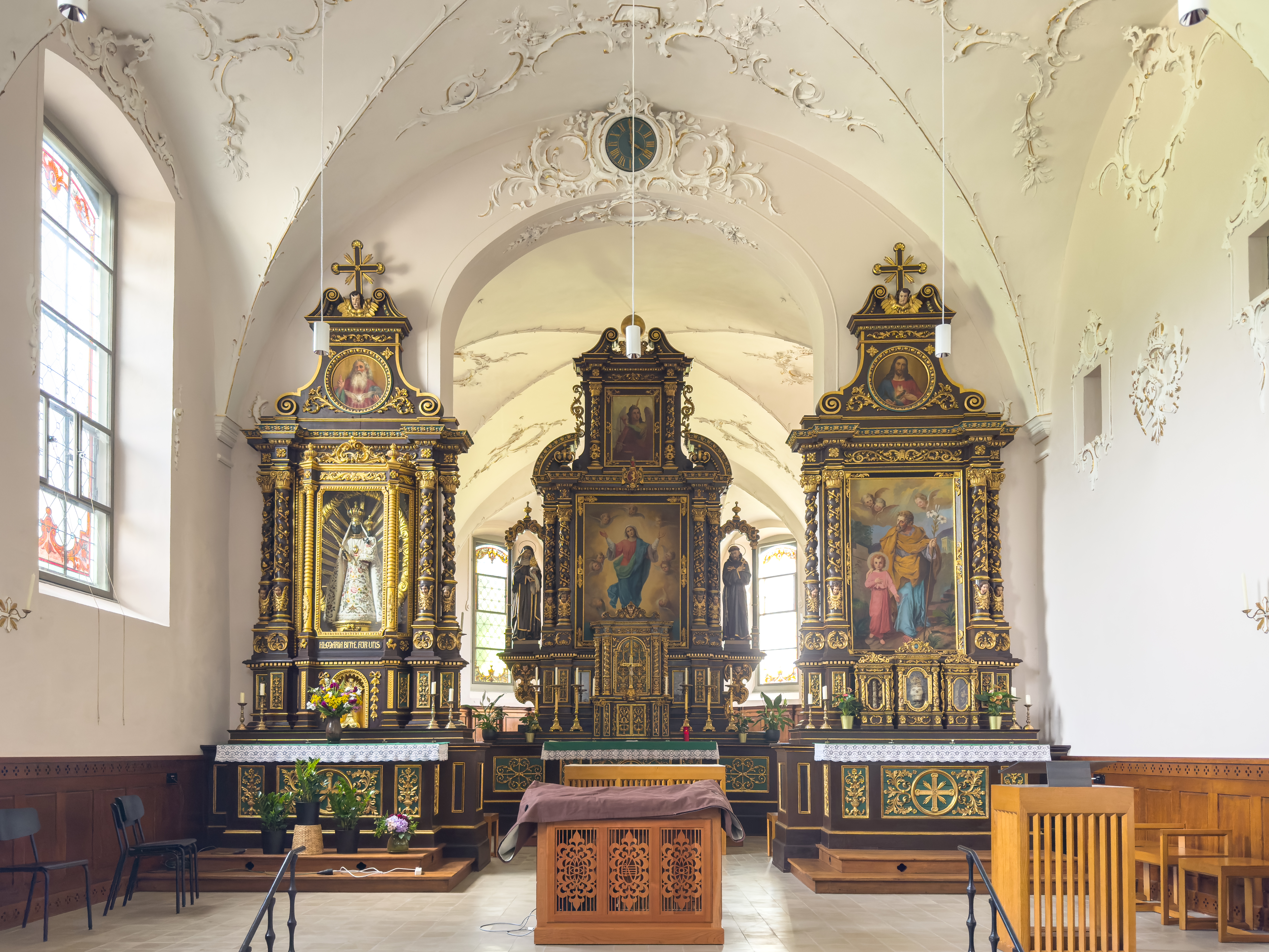
