= Wald, Appenzell Ausserrhoden =

Wald
- Municipality
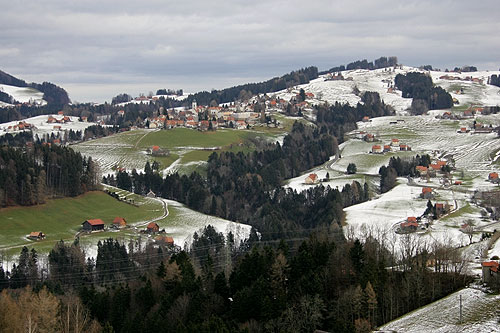

- Flag Coat of arms
- Location of Wald
- Location within Switzerland Location within Canton of Appenzell Ausserrhoden
- Coordinates: 47°25′N 9°29′E
- Country: Switzerland
- Canton: Appenzell Ausserrhoden
- District: n.a.

Government
  - Mayor: Edith Beeler

Area
  - Total: 6.82 km^{2} (2.63 sq mi)
- Elevation: 962 m (3,156 ft)

Population (December 2008)
  - Total: 868
  - Density: 127/km^{2} (330/sq mi)
- Time zone: UTC+01:00 (CET)
  - Summer (DST): UTC+02:00 (CEST)
- Postal code: 9044
- SFOS number: 3036
- ISO 3166 code: CH-AR
- Surrounded by: Heiden, Oberegg (AI), Rehetobel, Trogen
- Website: www.wald.ar.ch

Wald (German pronunciation: [valt]) is a municipality in the canton of Appenzell Ausserrhoden in Switzerland.

== Geography ==
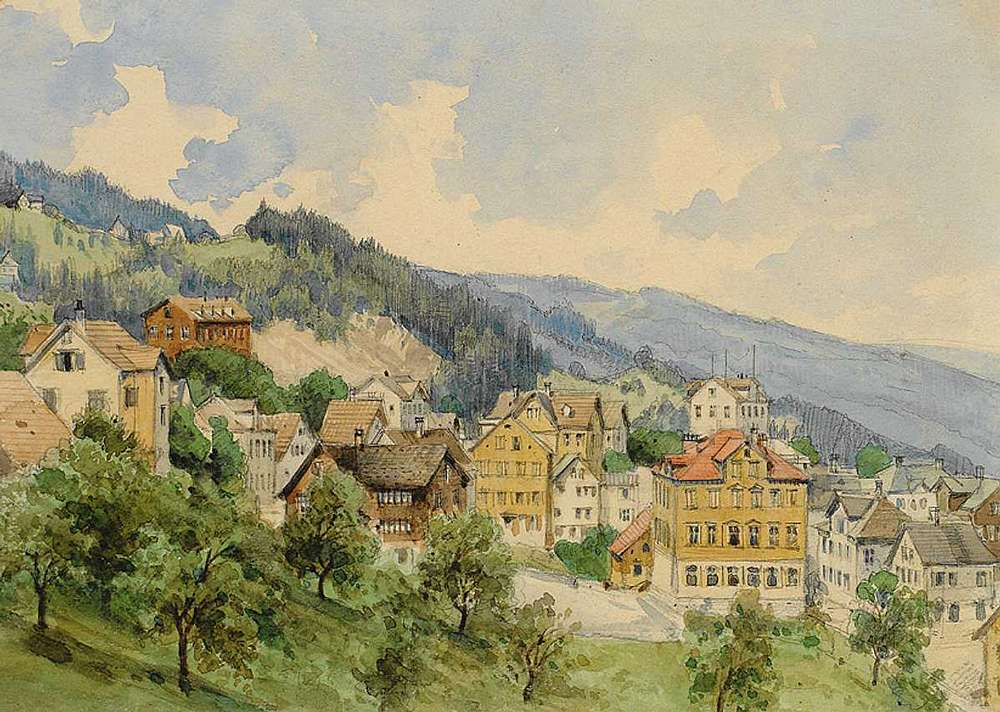
Watercolor of Wald during the 19th Century

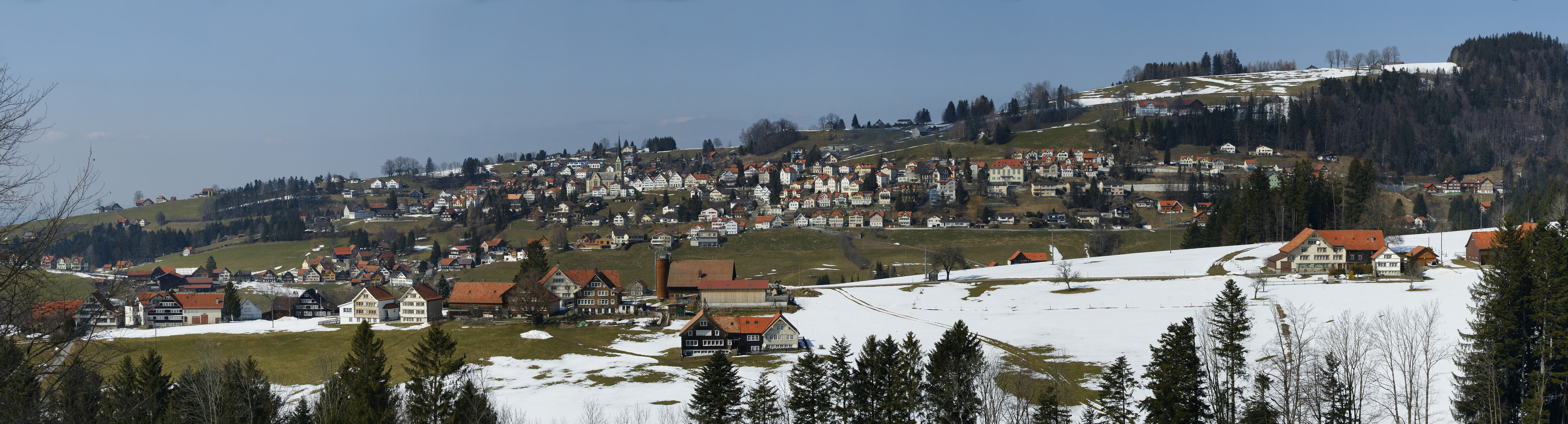
Panoramic view of the municipality of Wald over the village Rehetobel. In the upper right corner of the picture is Gupf mountain.

Aerial view from 1800 m by Walter Mittelholzer (1927)

Wald has an area, as of 2006, of 6.8 km^{2} (2.6 sq mi). Of this area, 66% is used for agricultural purposes, while 28.4% is forested. Of the rest of the land, 5.4% is settled (buildings or roads) and the remainder (0.1%) is non-productive (rivers, glaciers or mountains).

== Demographics ==
Wald has a population (as of 2020) of 882. In 2008 about 10.1% were foreign nationals. Over the last 10 years the population has decreased at a rate of -6.3%. Most of the population (as of 2000) speaks German (93.6%), with Serbo-Croatian being second most common (2.3%) and French being third (0.8%).

As of 2000, the gender distribution of the population was 51.3% male and 48.7% female. The age distribution, as of 2000, in Wald is; 94 people or 10.7% of the population are between 0–6 years old. 129 people or 14.6% are 6-15, and 50 people or 5.7% are 16-19. Of the adult population, 46 people or 5.2% of the population are between 20–24 years old. 231 people or 26.2% are 25-44, and 200 people or 22.7% are 45-64. The senior population distribution is 89 people or 10.1% of the population are between 65–79 years old, and 42 people or 4.8% are over 80.

In the 2007 federal election the FDP received 65.3% of the vote.

In Wald about 77.5% of the population (between age 25-64) have completed either non-mandatory upper secondary education or additional higher education (either university or a Fachhochschule).

Wald has an unemployment rate of 0.58%. As of 2005, there were 73 people employed in the primary economic sector and about 31 businesses involved in this sector. 133 people are employed in the secondary sector and there are 16 businesses in this sector. 88 people are employed in the tertiary sector, with 29 businesses in this sector.

The historical population is given in the following table:

Historical population
Year	Pop.	±%
1980	695	—
1990	851	+22.4%
2000	894	+5.1%
2005	874	−2.2%
2007	875	+0.1%
