= Grub, Appenzell Ausserrhoden =

Grub
- Municipality
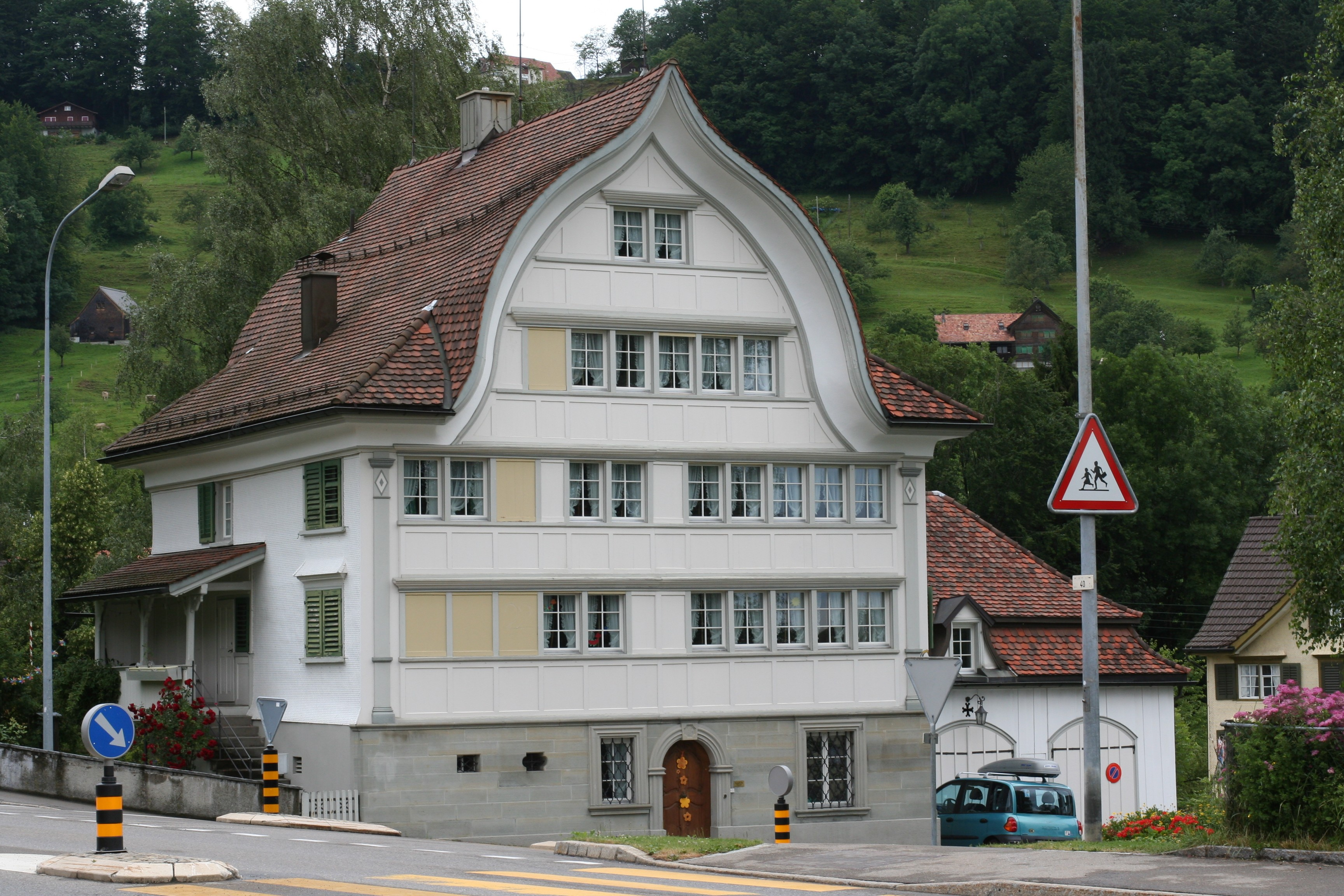

- Coat of arms
- Location of Grub
- Location within Switzerland Location within Canton of Appenzell Ausserrhoden
- Coordinates: 47°27′N 9°30′E
- Country: Switzerland
- Canton: Appenzell Ausserrhoden
- District: n.a.

Area
  - Total: 4.26 km^{2} (1.64 sq mi)
- Elevation: 813 m (2,667 ft)

Population (December 2008)
  - Total: 1,014
  - Density: 238/km^{2} (616/sq mi)
- Time zone: UTC+01:00 (CET)
  - Summer (DST): UTC+02:00 (CEST)
- Postal code: 9035
- SFOS number: 3031
- ISO 3166 code: CH-AR
- Surrounded by: Eggersriet (SG), Heiden, Rehetobel
- Website: www.grub.ch

Grub AR is a municipality in the canton of Appenzell Ausserrhoden in Switzerland.

== History ==
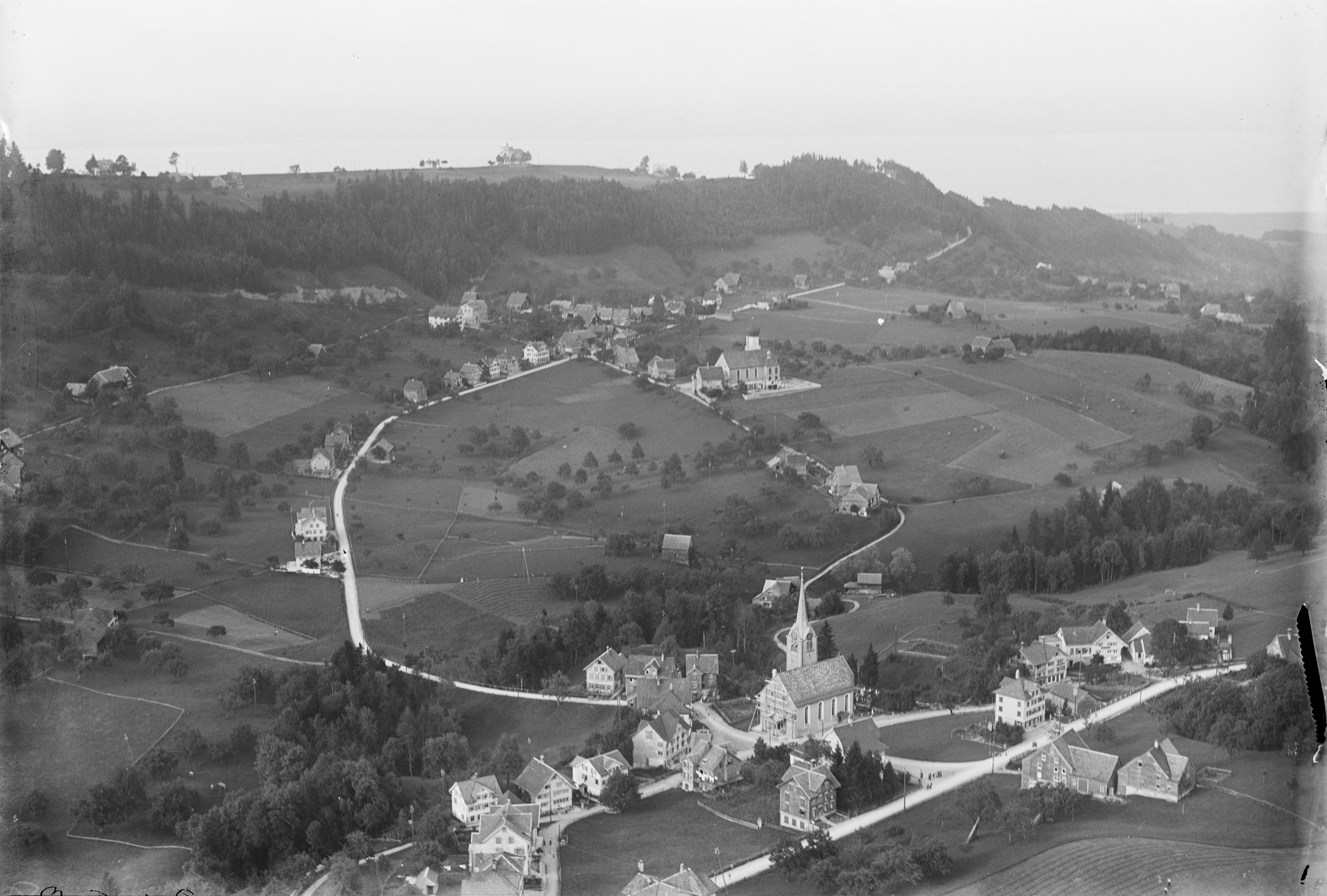
Aerial view from 300 m by Walter Mittelholzer (1923)

Grub is first mentioned in 1488 as uss der Gruob.

== Geography ==
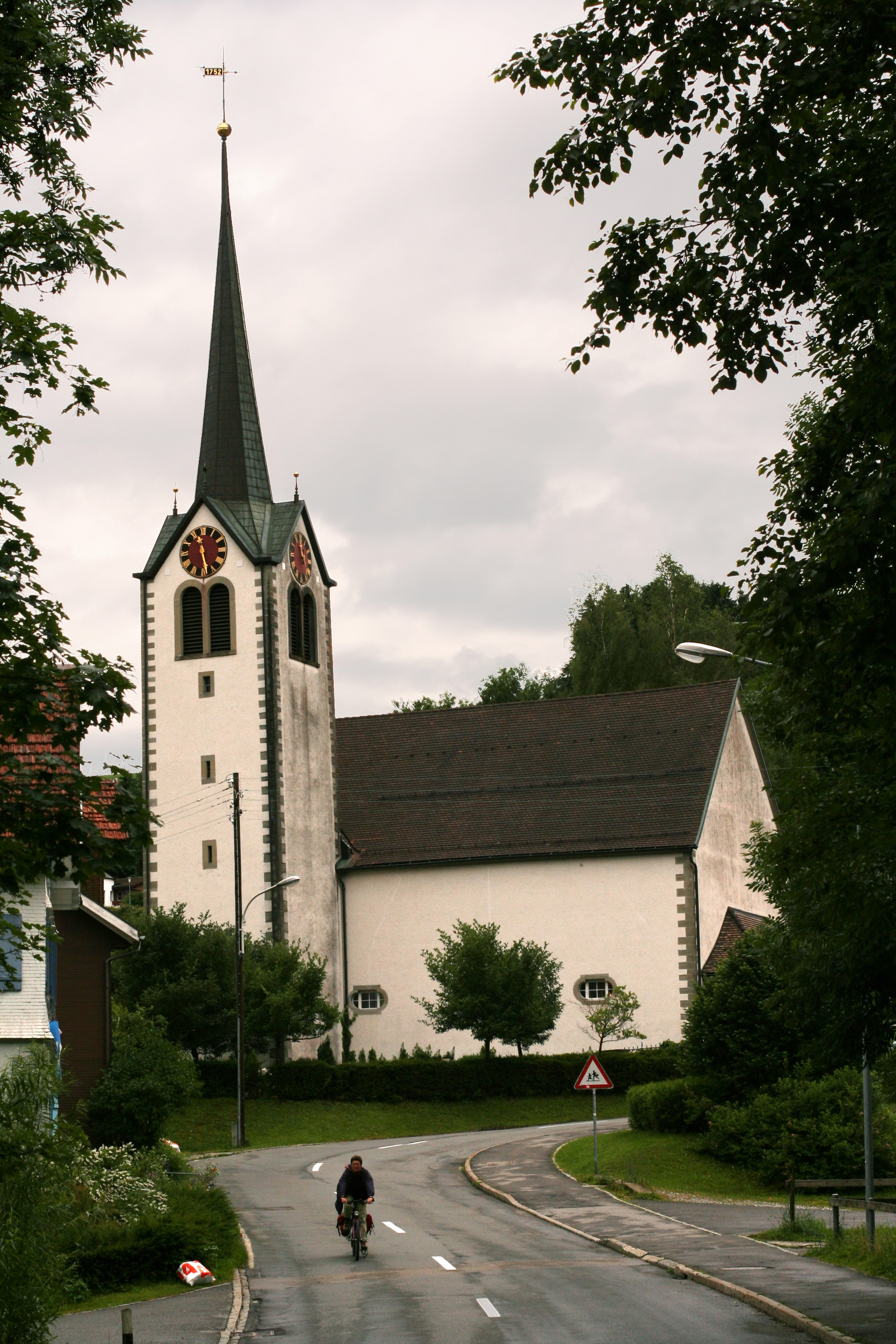
Protestant church in Grub AR

Grub has an area, as of 2006, of 4.2 km^{2} (1.6 sq mi). Of this area, 53.9% is used for agricultural purposes, while 33.1% is forested. Of the rest of the land, 12.8% is settled (buildings or roads) and the remainder (0.2%) is non-productive (rivers, glaciers or mountains).

The municipality is located in the former District of Vorderland. It consists of the village of Grub and scattered hamlets and individual farm houses. The protestant municipality of Grub AR is separated by a creek from the Catholic Grub SG (now part of the municipality of Eggersriet) in the canton of St. Gallen.

== Demographics ==
Grub has a population (as of 2008) of 1,014, of which about 9.3% are foreign nationals. Over the last 10 years the population has decreased at a rate of -1.8%. Most of the population (as of 2000) speaks German (94.4%), with Spanish being second most common ( 1.0%) and Italian being third ( 0.5%).

As of 2000, the gender distribution of the population was 48.9% male and 51.1% female. The age distribution, as of 2000, in Grub is; 90 people or 8.7% of the population are between 0–6 years old. 163 people or 15.7% are 6-15, and 50 people or 4.8% are 16-19. Of the adult population, 44 people or 4.2% of the population are between 20–24 years old. 283 people or 27.3% are 25-44, and 255 people or 24.6% are 45-64. The senior population distribution is 112 people or 10.8% of the population are between 65–79 years old, and 41 people or 3.9% are over 80.

In the 2007 federal election the FDP received 68.3% of the vote.

The entire Swiss population is generally well educated. In Grub about 73.8% of the population (between age 25-64) have completed either non-mandatory upper secondary education or additional higher education (either university or a Fachhochschule).

Grub has an unemployment rate of 1.54%. As of 2005, there were 48 people employed in the primary economic sector and about 19 businesses involved in this sector. 85 people are employed in the secondary sector and there are 15 businesses in this sector. 138 people are employed in the tertiary sector, with 30 businesses in this sector.

The historical population is given in the following table:

Historical population
Year	Pop.	±%
1667	543	—
1734	890	+63.9%
1818	715	−19.7%
1850	967	+35.2%
1900	1,017	+5.2%
1950	702	−31.0%
1970	623	−11.3%
1980	833	+33.7%
1990	1,019	+22.3%
2000	1,031	+1.2%
2005	1,003	−2.7%
2007	1,007	+0.4%
