= Untereggen =

- Municipality
- Coat of arms
- Location of Untereggen
- Location within Switzerland Location within Canton of St. Gallen
- Coordinates: 47°28′N 9°27′E
- Country: Switzerland
- Canton: St. Gallen
- District: Rorschach

Government
  - Mayor: Norbert Rüttimann

Area
  - Total: 7.14 km^{2} (2.76 sq mi)
- Elevation: 607 m (1,991 ft)

Population (December 2020)
  - Total: 1,034
  - Density: 145/km^{2} (375/sq mi)
- Time zone: UTC+01:00 (CET)
  - Summer (DST): UTC+02:00 (CEST)
- Postal code: 9033
- SFOS number: 3219
- ISO 3166 code: CH-SG
- Surrounded by: Eggersriet, Goldach, Mörschwil, Rorschacherberg, St. Gallen
- Website: untereggen.ch

Untereggen is a municipality in the Wahlkreis (constituency) of Rorschach in the canton of St. Gallen in Switzerland.

== Geography ==
Aerial view (1969)

Untereggen has an area, as of 2006, of 7.1 km^{2} (2.7 sq mi). Of this area, 50.2% is used for agricultural purposes, while 42.9% is forested. Of the rest of the land, 5.5% is settled (buildings or roads) and the remainder (1.4%) is non-productive (rivers or lakes).

== Coat of arms ==
The blazon of the municipal coat of arms is Argent a Crow Sable statant on Coupeaux Gules.

== Demographics ==
Untereggen has a population (as of 31 December 2020) of 1,034. As of 2007, about 4.4% of the population was made up of foreign nationals. Of the foreign population, (as of 2000), 11 are from Germany, 20 are from Italy, 2 are from ex-Yugoslavia, 2 are from Austria, and 5 are from another country. Over the last 10 years the population has grown at a rate of 31.7%. Most of the population (as of 2000) speaks German (97.8%), with Italian being second most common (1.0%) and English being third (0.2%). Of the Swiss national languages (as of 2000), 877 speak German, 1 person speaks, French, 9 people speak Italian, and 1 person speaks Romansh.

The age distribution, as of 2000, in Untereggen is; 171 children or 19.1% of the population are between 0 and 9 years old and 131 teenagers or 14.6% are between 10 and 19. Of the adult population, 69 people or 7.7% of the population are between 20 and 29 years old. 175 people or 19.5% are between 30 and 39, 120 people or 13.4% are between 40 and 49, and 99 people or 11.0% are between 50 and 59. The senior population distribution is 67 people or 7.5% of the population are between 60 and 69 years old, 45 people or 5.0% are between 70 and 79, there are 18 people or 2.0% who are between 80 and 89, and there are 2 people or 0.2% who are between 90 and 99.

In 2000 there were 68 persons (or 7.6% of the population) who were living alone in a private dwelling. There were 144 (or 16.1%) persons who were part of a couple (married or otherwise committed) without children, and 596 (or 66.4%) who were part of a couple with children. There were 49 (or 5.5%) people who lived in single parent home, while there are 14 persons who were adult children living with one or both parents, 12 persons who lived in a household made up of relatives, 5 who lived household made up of unrelated persons, and 9 who are either institutionalized or live in another type of collective housing.

In the 2007 federal election the most popular party was the SVP which received 37.7% of the vote. The next three most popular parties were the CVP (22.6%), the SP (12.1%) and the FDP (10.5%).

In Untereggen about 77.8% of the population (between age 25–64) have completed either non-mandatory upper secondary education or additional higher education (either university or a Fachhochschule). Out of the total population in Untereggen, as of 2000, the highest education level completed by 152 people (16.9% of the population) was Primary, while 346 (38.6%) have completed their secondary education, 96 (10.7%) have attended a Tertiary school, and 26 (2.9%) are not in school. The remainder did not answer this question.

== Economy ==
As of 2007, Untereggen had an unemployment rate of 0.74%. As of 2005, there were 73 people employed in the primary economic sector and about 31 businesses involved in this sector. 86 people are employed in the secondary sector and there are 24 businesses in this sector. 72 people are employed in the tertiary sector, with 21 businesses in this sector.

As of October 2009 the average unemployment rate was 2.0%. There were 71 businesses in the municipality of which 23 were involved in the secondary sector of the economy while 21 were involved in the third.

As of 2000 there were 132 residents who worked in the municipality, while 326 residents worked outside Untereggen and 79 people commuted into the municipality for work.

== Religion ==
From the 2000 census, 580 or 64.7% are Roman Catholic, while 257 or 28.7% belonged to the Swiss Reformed Church. Of the rest of the population, there is 1 individual who belongs to the Christian Catholic faith, there is 1 individual who belongs to the Orthodox Church, and there are 10 individuals (or about 1.11% of the population) who belong to another Christian church. There are 4 (or about 0.45% of the population) who are Islamic. There are 1 individuals (or about 0.11% of the population) who belong to another church (not listed on the census), 35 (or about 3.90% of the population) belong to no church, are agnostic or atheist, and 8 individuals (or about 0.89% of the population) did not answer the question.

== Sights ==
The Sulzberg in Untereggen is designated as part of the Inventory of Swiss Heritage Sites.
