= Rehetobel =

- Municipality
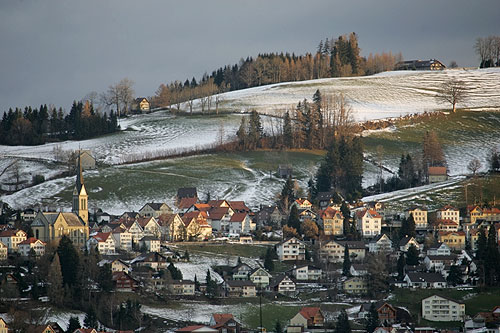

- Flag Coat of arms
- Location of Rehetobel
- Location within Switzerland Location within Canton of Appenzell Ausserrhoden
- Coordinates: 47°25′N 9°29′E
- Country: Switzerland
- Canton: Appenzell Ausserrhoden
- District: n.a.

Area
  - Total: 6.75 km^{2} (2.61 sq mi)
- Elevation: 958 m (3,143 ft)

Population (December 2008)
  - Total: 1,680
  - Density: 249/km^{2} (645/sq mi)
- Time zone: UTC+01:00 (CET)
  - Summer (DST): UTC+02:00 (CEST)
- Postal code: 9038
- SFOS number: 3034
- ISO 3166 code: CH-AR
- Surrounded by: Eggersriet (SG), Grub, Heiden, Speicher, Trogen, Wald
- Website: www.rehetobel.ch

Rehetobel is a municipality in the canton of Appenzell Ausserrhoden in Switzerland.

== Geography ==
Aerial view from 200 m by Walter Mittelholzer (1923)

Rehetobel has an area, as of 2006, of 6.7 km^{2} (2.6 sq mi). Of this area, 53.9% is used for agricultural purposes, while 35.2% is forested. The rest of the land, (10.9%) is settled.

The municipality is located in the former District of Vorderland. It consists of the village of Rehetobel and several hamlets and scattered farm houses.

Rehetobel is located south of the mountain Gupf. On average the village enjoys the longest hours of sunshine in Switzerland. The lowest elevation is Achmüli (610 m (2,000 ft)), the highest is Kaienspitz (1,121 m (3,678 ft)).

== History ==
The area was settled in the 12th and 13th century. The name Rehentobel was first mentioned in 1463 as an das Rechtobel. In 1669 the church was built, which meant independence from the village of Trogen. The church was rebuilt in 1737.

The village was destroyed in a fire on 9 April 1796. The church was saved, but a total of 20 buildings were destroyed. In 1854 a house for the poor was established. It is today used as a nursery.

On 28 June 1890 the church was destroyed in a fire, but by 1892 a new church was built.

== Demographics ==
Rehetobel has a population (as of 2008) of 1,680, of which about 7.9% are foreign nationals. Over the last 10 years the population has grown at a rate of 2.1%. Most of the population (as of 2000) speaks German (97.1%), with Spanish being second most common ( 0.6%) and Portuguese being third ( 0.4%).

As of 2000, the gender distribution of the population was 47.6% male and 52.4% female. The age distribution, as of 2000, in Rehetobel is; 141 people or 8.1% of the population are between 0–6 years old. 201 people or 11.5% are 6–15, and 84 people or 4.8% are 16–19. Of the adult population, 64 people or 3.7% of the population are between 20 and 24 years old. 508 people or 29.2% are 25–44, and 404 people or 23.2% are 45–64. The senior population distribution is 220 people or 12.6% of the population are between 65 and 79 years old, and 120 people or 6.9% are over 80.

In the 2007 federal election the FDP received 74.6% of the vote.

In Rehetobel about 73.8% of the population (between age 25–64) have completed either non-mandatory upper secondary education or additional higher education (either university or a Fachhochschule).

The historical population is given in the following table:

Historical population
Year	Pop.	±%
1743	1,643	—
1813	1,860	+13.2%
1818	1,587	−14.7%
1850	1,984	+25.0%
1900	2,184	+10.1%
1910	2,416	+10.6%
1941	1,554	−35.7%
1950	1,740	+12.0%
1980	1,416	−18.6%
2000	1,705	+20.4%
2005	1,707	+0.1%
2007	1,674	−1.9%

== Economy ==
There are approximately 700 working places in the village. Trade and industry make up 40%, agriculture 9%, and the service sector employs 51%. Agriculture consists of dairy farming and cattle breeding.

Rehetobel has an unemployment rate of 1.11%. As of 2005, there were 61 people employed in the primary economic sector and about 30 businesses involved in this sector. 144 people are employed in the secondary sector and there are 29 businesses in this sector. 320 people are employed in the tertiary sector, with 58 businesses in this sector.
