= Null Stern Hotel =

Coordinates: 47.3313°N 9.3288°E

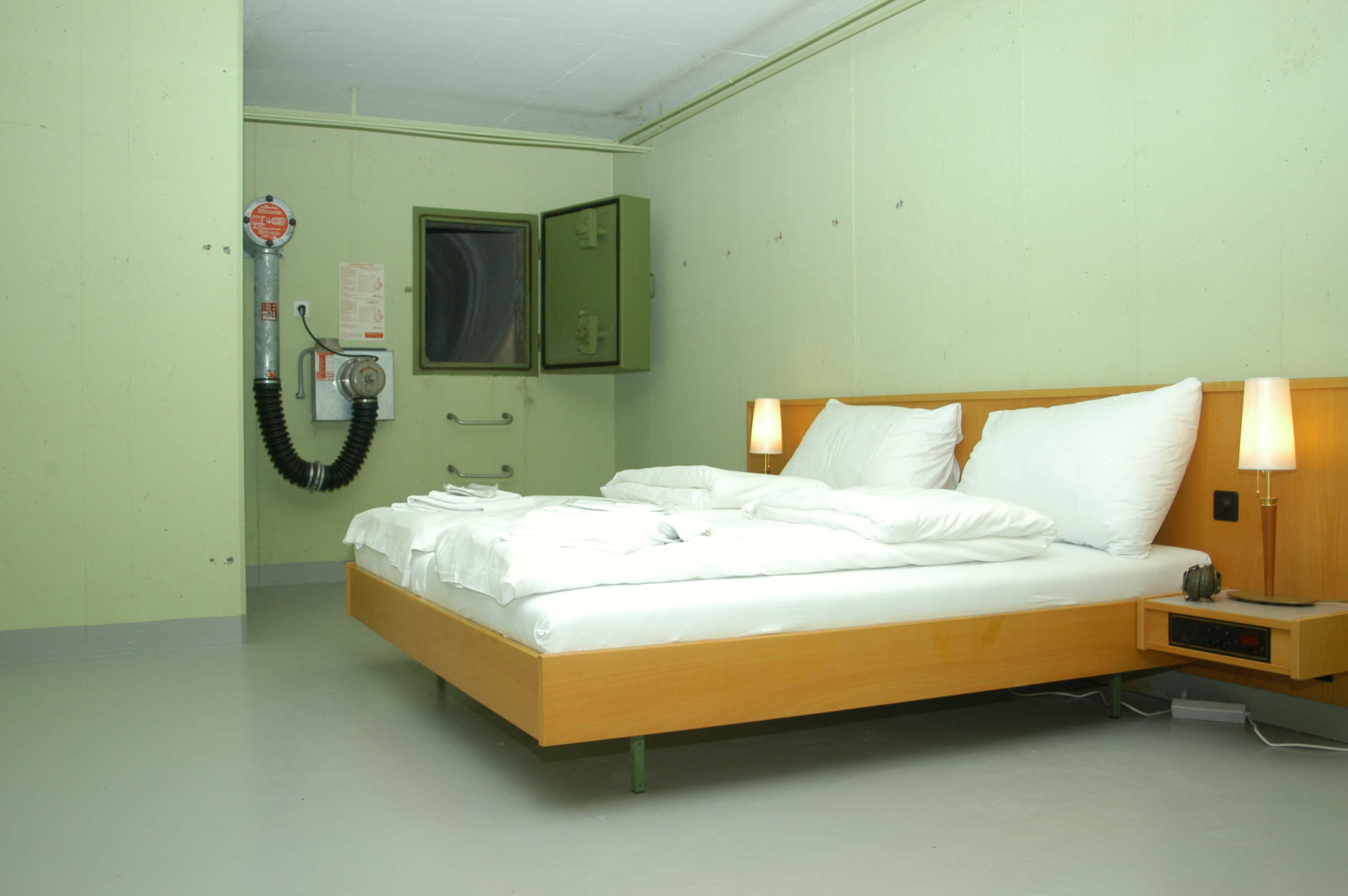
View of a room at Null Stern Hotel

The Null Stern Hotel is a former nuclear bunker converted into a hotel, now a museum. A prototype opened in Teufen, Appenzell Ausserrhoden, Switzerland on June 5, 2009, and was transformed into a museum in June 2010. Future hotels are under planning in urban locations.

== Concept ==
Null Stern in German means zero star. This does not refer to the classification, but is part of the hotel brand name Null Stern – the only star is you.

The hotel was conceived by Daniel Charbonnier, MD Minds in Motion SA and Frank and Patrik Riklin, Artists, Atelier für Sonderaufgaben. In need of additional lodging capacity and choice, the local Commune of Sevelen (City Council) decided to turn to the art world to assist with transforming a Swiss nuclear bunker into affordable accommodation, leading to the night test in October 2008.

The artists claim its concept found its roots and values at the core of today's world of changing economic, ecological and social environments. The idea was to offer a “second life” to unused real estate while providing tailored customer service in a minimalistic environment. On 5 June 2009, a Null Stern Hotel prototype opened its doors in Teufen, Appenzellerland, Switzerland, and was transformed into a museum a year later in June 2010.

A "commercial expansion" was announced at the same time, but no other Null Stern Hotel has opened so far.

== Awards ==
The Null Stern Hotel was nominated at the Worldwide Hospitality Awards 2009 for the best innovation of the year. GEO, February 2010, ranked the Null Stern Hotel among the Top 100 Hotels In Europe.

== See also ==
- List of museums in Switzerland
