= Eggersriet =

- Municipality
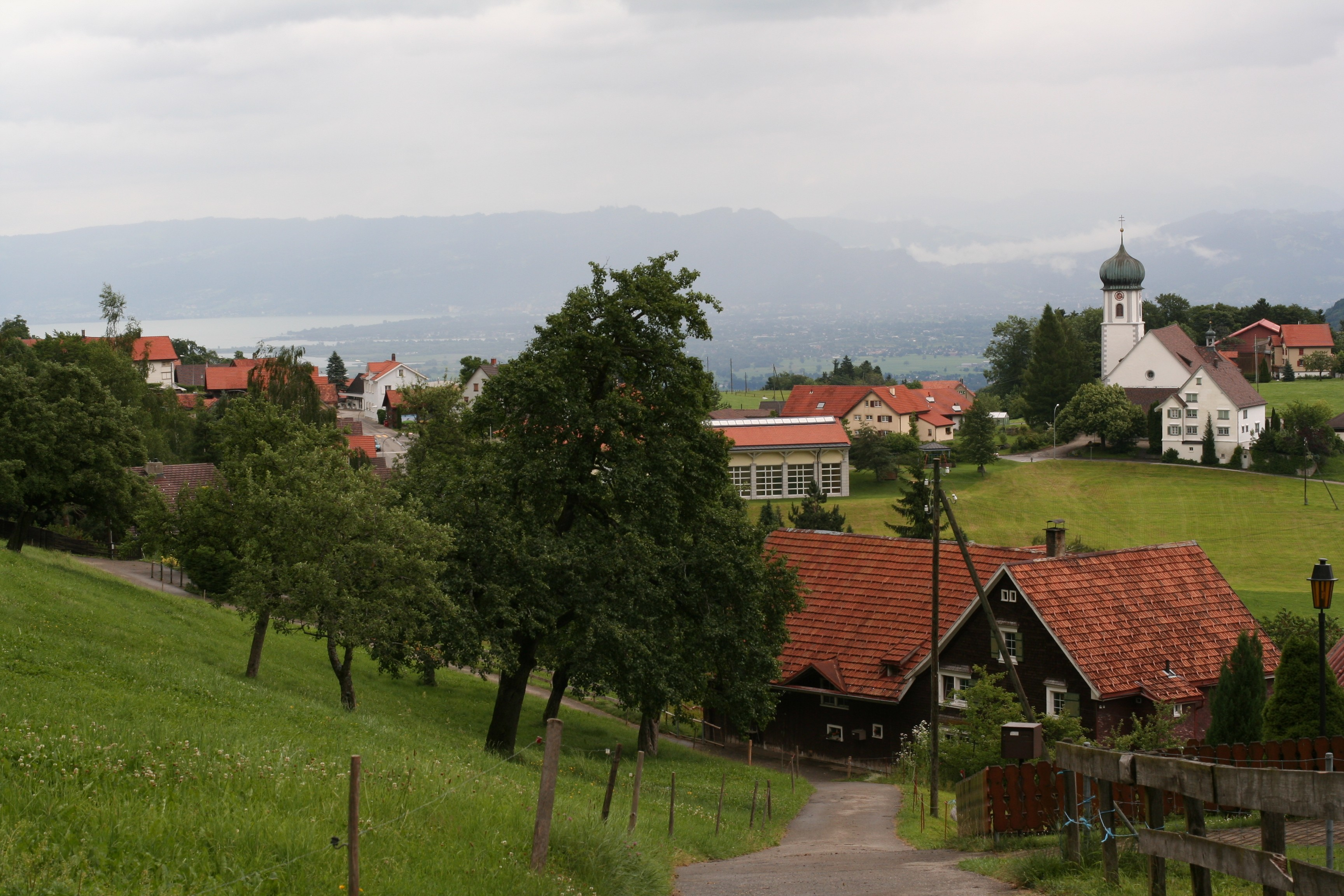

- Coat of arms
- Location of Eggersriet
- Location within Switzerland Location within Canton of St. Gallen
- Coordinates: 47°27′N 9°28′E
- Country: Switzerland
- Canton: St. Gallen
- District: St. Gallen

Government
  - Mayor: Roger Hochreutener (as of 2013)

Area
  - Total: 8.82 km^{2} (3.41 sq mi)
- Elevation: 820 m (2,690 ft)

Population (December 2020)
  - Total: 2,334
  - Density: 265/km^{2} (685/sq mi)
- Time zone: UTC+01:00 (CET)
  - Summer (DST): UTC+02:00 (CEST)
- Postal code: 9034
- SFOS number: 3212
- ISO 3166 code: CH-SG
- Surrounded by: Grub (AR), Heiden (AR), Lutzenberg (AR), Rehetobel (AR), Rorschacherberg, St. Gallen, Speicher (AR), Untereggen
- Website: www.eggersriet.ch

Eggersriet is a municipality in the Wahlkreis (constituency) of St. Gallen in the canton of St. Gallen in Switzerland.

== History ==
Eggersriet is first mentioned in 1260 as Egglinsriet.

== Geography ==
Eggersriet has an area, as of 2006, of 8.9 km^{2} (3.4 sq mi). Of this area, 56.9% is used for agricultural purposes, while 33.2% is forested. Of the rest of the land, 9.3% is settled (buildings or roads) and the remainder (0.6%) is non-productive (rivers or lakes).

The municipality was located in the Rorschach district, but since 2001 has been part of the St. Gallen Wahlkreis. It is located on the southern slope of the Rorschacherberg and along the Heiden-St. Gallen road. It consists of the village of Eggersriet and the hamlets of Dorf, Wisen and Egg in Eggersriet as well as Grub (SG).

Aerial view (1949)

== Coat of arms ==
The blazon of the municipal coat of arms is Azure two Bulrushes proper issuant between three Mounts Vert.

== Demographics ==
Eggersriet has a population (as of 31 December 2020) of 2,334. As of 2007, about 9.0% of the population was made up of foreign nationals. Of the foreign population, (as of 2000), 59 are from Germany, 6 are from Italy, 27 are from ex-Yugoslavia, 19 are from Austria, and 56 are from another country. Over the last 10 years the population has grown at a rate of 3.1%. Most of the population (as of 2000) speaks German (95.8%), with Albanian being second most common ( 0.7%) and French being third ( 0.6%). Of the Swiss national languages (as of 2000), 1,992 speak German, 13 people speak French, 9 people speak Italian, and 2 people speak Romansh.

The age distribution, as of 2000, in Eggersriet is; 233 children or 11.2% of the population are between 0 and 9 years old and 345 teenagers or 16.6% are between 10 and 19. Of the adult population, 201 people or 9.7% of the population are between 20 and 29 years old. 296 people or 14.2% are between 30 and 39, 326 people or 15.7% are between 40 and 49, and 327 people or 15.7% are between 50 and 59. The senior population distribution is 188 people or 9.0% of the population are between 60 and 69 years old, 90 people or 4.3% are between 70 and 79, there are 71 people or 3.4% who are between 80 and 89, and there are 2 people or 0.1% who are between 90 and 99.

In 2000 there were 179 persons (or 8.6% of the population) who were living alone in a private dwelling. There were 433 (or 20.8%) persons who were part of a couple (married or otherwise committed) without children, and 1,280 (or 61.6%) who were part of a couple with children. There were 119 (or 5.7%) people who lived in single parent home, while there are 23 persons who were adult children living with one or both parents, 8 persons who lived in a household made up of relatives, 13 who lived household made up of unrelated persons, and 24 who are either institutionalized or live in another type of collective housing.

In the 2007 federal election the most popular party was the SVP which received 24.6% of the vote. The next three most popular parties were the CVP (22.7%), the SP (14.6%) and the FDP (13.2%).

The entire Swiss population is generally well educated. In Eggersriet about 81.1% of the population (between age 25-64) have completed either non-mandatory upper secondary education or additional higher education (either university or a Fachhochschule). Out of the total population in Eggersriet, as of 2000, the highest education level completed by 373 people (17.9% of the population) was Primary, while 831 (40.0%) have completed Secondary, 302 (14.5%) have attended a Tertiary school, and 72 (3.5%) are not in school. The remainder did not answer this question.

The historical population is given in the following table:

year	population
1850	1,635
1900	1,465
1950	1,165
1970	929
1980	1,741
2000	2,079

== Economy ==
As of 2007, Eggersriet had an unemployment rate of 1.47%. As of 2005, there were 95 people employed in the primary economic sector and about 45 businesses involved in this sector. 51 people are employed in the secondary sector and there are 19 businesses in this sector. 210 people are employed in the tertiary sector, with 54 businesses in this sector.

As of October 2009 the average unemployment rate was 2.4%. There were 121 businesses in the municipality of which 19 were involved in the secondary sector of the economy while 59 were involved in the third.

As of 2000 there were 283 residents who worked in the municipality, while 822 residents worked outside Eggersriet and 80 people commuted into the municipality for work.

== Religion ==
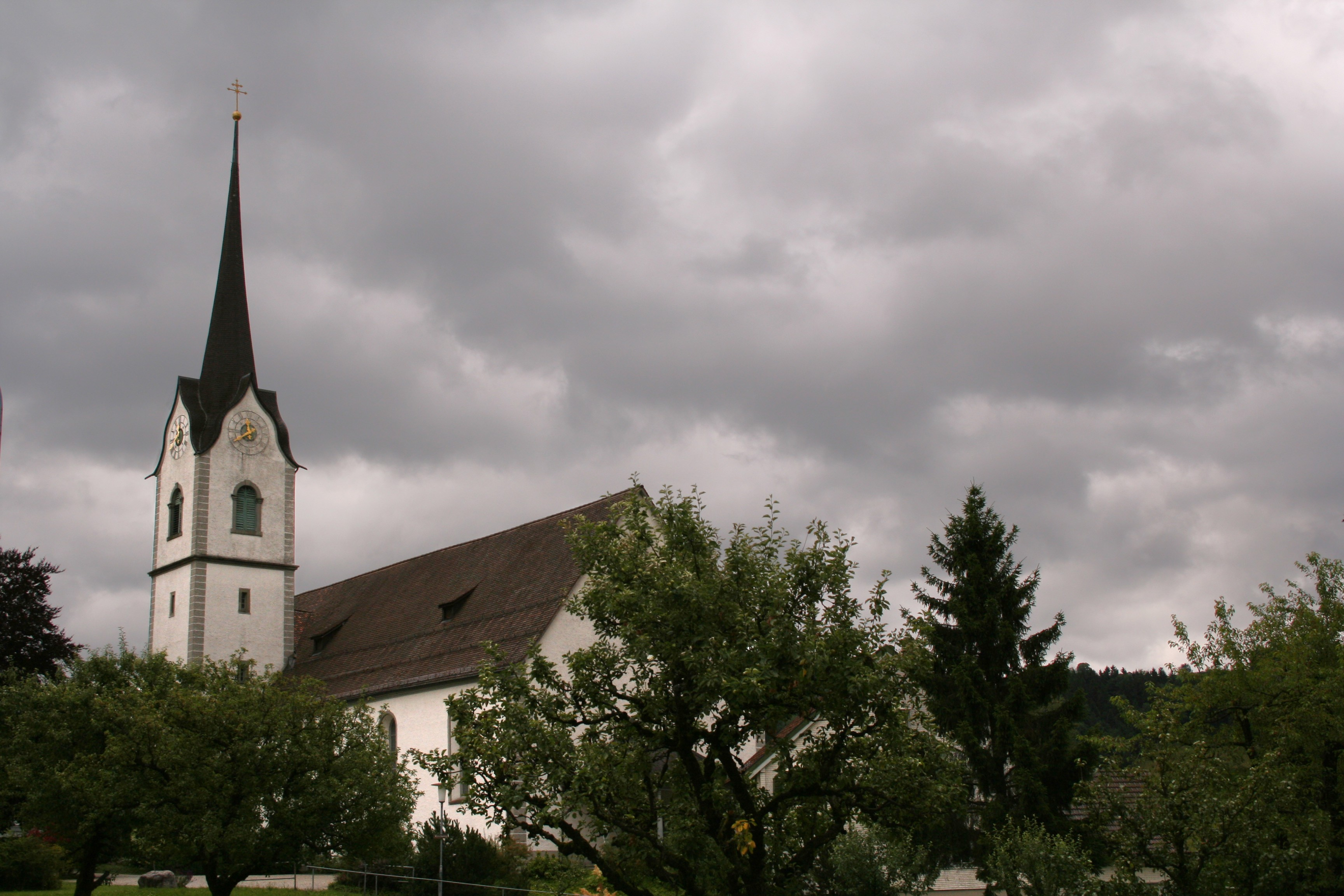
Catholic church of Eggersriet

From the 2000 census, 1,132 or 54.4% are Roman Catholic, while 602 or 29.0% belonged to the Swiss Reformed Church. Of the rest of the population, there is 1 individual who belongs to the Christian Catholic faith, there are 9 individuals (or about 0.43% of the population) who belong to the Orthodox Church, and there are 68 individuals (or about 3.27% of the population) who belong to another Christian church. There are 29 (or about 1.39% of the population) who are Islamic. There are 7 individuals (or about 0.34% of the population) who belong to another church (not listed on the census), 185 (or about 8.90% of the population) belong to no church, are agnostic or atheist, and 46 individuals (or about 2.21% of the population) did not answer the question.

== Sights ==
The village of Eggersriet is designated as part of the Inventory of Swiss Heritage Sites.

== Weather ==
Eggersriet has an average of 150 days of rain or snow per year and on average receives 1,388 mm (54.6 in) of precipitation. The wettest month is July during which time Eggersriet receives an average of 175 mm (6.9 in) of rain or snow. During this month there is precipitation for an average of 13.7 days. The month with the most days of precipitation is June, with an average of 14.8, but with only 155 mm (6.1 in) of rain or snow. The driest month of the year is February with an average of 76 mm (3.0 in) of precipitation over 13.7 days.
