= Appenzell Ausserrhoden =

Canton of Switzerland

Canton of Appenzell Ausserrhoden Kanton Appenzell Ausserrhoden (German) Canton of Appenzell Outer Rhodes
- Canton
- Flag Coat of arms Brandmark
- Interactive map of Canton of Appenzell Ausserrhoden
- Coordinates: 47°3′N 9°1′E
- Country: Switzerland
- Capitals: Herisau (executive and legislative) Trogen (judicial)
- Subdivisions: 20 municipalities

Government
  - President: Yves Noël Balmer
  - Executive: Regierungsrat (5)
  - Legislative: Kantonsrat (65)

Area
  - Total: 242.84 km^{2} (93.76 sq mi)

Population (December 2020)
  - Total: 55,309
  - Density: 227.76/km^{2} (589.89/sq mi)

GDP
  - Total: CHF 3.190 billion (2020)
  - Per capita: CHF 57,601 (2020)
- ISO 3166 code: CH-AR
- Highest point: 2,502 m (8,209 ft): Säntis
- Lowest point: 430 m (1,411 ft): Lutzenberg
- Joined: 1513
- Languages: German
- Website: www.ar.ch

Logo

Canton of Appenzell Ausserrhoden (German: Kanton Appenzell Ausserrhoden [ˈapn̩tsɛl ˈaʊsərˌroːdn̩]; Romansh: Chantun Appenzell Dadora; French: Canton d'Appenzell Rhodes-Extérieures; Italian: Canton Appenzello Esterno), in English sometimes Appenzell Outer Rhodes, is one of the 26 cantons forming the Swiss Confederation. It is composed of twenty municipalities. The seat of the government and parliament is Herisau, and the seat of judicial authorities are in Trogen. It is traditionally considered a "half-canton", the other half being Appenzell Innerrhoden.

Appenzell Ausserrhoden is located in the north east of Switzerland. Together with the canton of Appenzell Innerrhoden, it forms an enclave within the canton of St. Gallen. The canton is essentially located in the Alpine foothills of the Alpstein massif, culminating at the Säntis.

Appenzell Ausserrhoden was part of the historical canton of Appenzell, which was divided into Appenzell Innerrhoden (Catholic) and Appenzell Ausserrhoden (Protestant) in 1597 as a result of the Swiss Reformation.

== History ==
Settlement in Appenzell started in the 7th and the 8th century alongside the river Glatt, nowadays part of canton of St. Gallen. The abbey of Saint Gall was of great influence on the local population. In 907 Herisau is mentioned for the first time, the canton (Appenzell: abbatis cella) is named first in 1071.

=== Foundation ===
The name Appenzell (Latin: abbatis cella) means "cell (estate) of the abbot." This refers to the Abbey of St Gall, which exerted a great influence on the area. By the middle of the 11th century, the abbots of St Gall had established their power in the land later called Appenzell, which, too, became thoroughly teutonized, its early inhabitants having probably been romanized Raetians.

By about 1360, conflicts over grazing rights, taxes, and tithes were causing concern for both the abbot and the farmers of Appenzell. Both parties wanted to protect their rights and interests by joining the new Swabian League. In 1377 Appenzell was allowed to join the League with the support of the cities of Konstanz and St. Gallen (the city of St. Gallen was often at odds with the neighboring Abbey of St Gall). With the support of League, Appenzell refused to pay many of the gifts and tithes that the Abbot Kuno von Stoffeln demanded. In response to the loss of revenue from his estates, Kuno approached the Austrian House of Habsburg for help. In 1392 he made an agreement with the Habsburgs, which was renewed in 1402. In response, in 1401 Appenzell entered into an alliance with the city of St. Gallen to protect their rights and freedom.

=== Independence and joining the Swiss Confederation ===
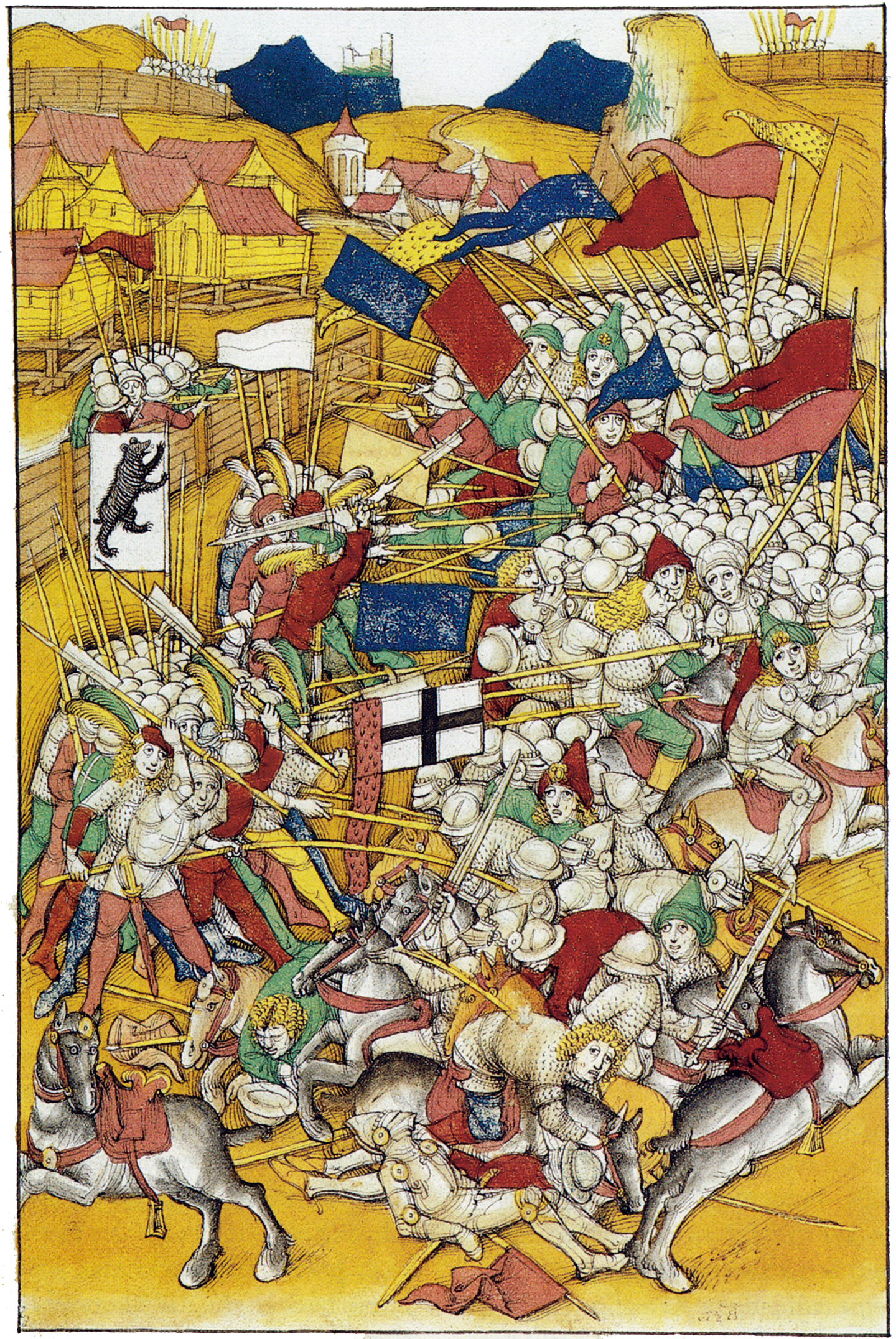
Battle of Vögelinsegg

Following increasing conflicts between the Appenzellers the abbot's agents, including the bailiff of Appenzell demanding that a dead body be dug up because he wanted the man's clothes, the Appenzellers planned an uprising. On a certain day, throughout the abbot's lands, they attacked the bailiffs and drove them out of the land. Following unsuccessful negotiations Appenzell and St. Gallen entered into a treaty. The treaty between St. Gallen and Appenzell marked a break between the abbot and his estates. Perhaps fearing the Habsburgs, in 1402 the League expelled Appenzell. During the same year, St. Gallen reached an agreement with the abbot and Appenzell could no longer count on St. Gallen's support. Appenzell declared itself ready to stand against the abbot, and in 1403 formed an alliance with the canton of Schwyz, a member of the Old Swiss Confederation that had defeated the Austrians in the previous century. Glarus provided less support, but authorized any citizen who wished to support Appenzell to do so. In response, the League raised an army and marched to St. Gallen before heading toward Appenzell. On 15 May 1403, they entered the pass to Speicher and outside the village of Vögelinsegg met the Appenzell army. A small force of Appenzell and Confederation troops defeated the League army and signed a short lived peace treaty.

Following another Appenzell victory on 17 June 1405, at Stoss Pass on the border of Appenzell town, the new canton continued to expand. During the expansion, Appenzell had even captured the abbot of St Gall and in response they were excommunicated by the Bishop of Constance.

However, while the Bund expanded the Austrians used the peace to regain their strength. On 11 September 1406 an association of nobles formed a knightly order known as the Sankt Jörgenschild (Order of St. George's Shield) to oppose the rebellious commoners of the Bund. Following a defeat at Bregenz, Appenzell was unable to hold the Bund together. The city of St. Gallen and the canton of Schwyz each paid off the Austrians to avoid an attack, and the Bund was dissolved by King Rupert on 4 April 1408.

As part of the peace treaty, the abbot gave up his ownership of Appenzell, but was still owed certain taxes. However, it wasn't until 1410 that the area was at peace.

In 1411 Appenzell signed a defensive treaty with the entire Swiss Confederation (except Bern), which strengthened its position against the abbot. Appenzell joined the Confederation as an "Associate Member" and did not become a full member until 1513. Following another battle in 1429, Appenzell was granted freedom from the obligations in the future. This treaty represented the end of Appenzell's last financial tie to the Abbey of St Gall and a movement to closer relationships with the Confederation.

=== Division of Appenzell ===
Starting in 1522, followers of Martin Luther and Huldrych Zwingli began to preach the Protestant Reformation in Appenzell. The early reformers had the most success in the outer Rhoden, a term that in the singular is said to mean a "clearing," and occurs in 1070, long before the final separation. Following the initial small success, in 1523 Joachim von Watt (also known as Joachim Vadian) began to preach the reformed version of the Acts of the Apostles to friends and fellow clergy. His preaching brought the Reformation into the forefront of public debate. In October 1523, the Council supported the Protestant principle of scriptural sermons and on 24 April 1524 Landsgemeinde confirmed the Cantonal Council's decision. However, the work of the Anabaptists in the Appenzell region (as well as in Zürich and St. Gallen) in 1525 led to government crackdowns. The first police action against the Anabaptists took place in June 1525, followed by the Anabaptist Disputation in Teufen in October 1529.

To end the confrontation between the old and new faiths, the Landesgemeinde decided in April 1525, that each parish should choose a faith, but that the principle of free movement would be supported, so that the religious minority could attend the church of their choice regardless of where they lived. The entire Ausserrhoden (except Herisau, where Joseph Forrester convinced them to remain Catholic until the late 16th century) converted to the Reformation in 1529. The Innerrhoden (except for Gais which joined Ausserrhoden in 1597) remained with the old faith. While the majority of the residents of Appenzell town remained Catholic under their priest, Diepolt Huter, there was a strong Reformed minority. In 1531, the minority were nearly successful in getting the town to ally with the Protestant Ausserrhoden. But an armed mob of angry residents from the neighboring village of Gonten prevented the abolition of the Mass in Appenzell. The Catholic victory in the Second War of Kappel in 1531 ended plans for a reformation of the entire canton of Appenzell.

Two small monasteries (Wonnenstein in Teufen and Grimmenstein in Walzenhausen) in Ausserrhoden remained Catholic even though the towns around them adopted the new faith. In 1870 the monastery grounds were declared exclaves of the canton Appenzell Innerrhoden by the federal government.

After the Second War of Kappel, the two religions reached a generally peaceful parity. They remained united by common business interests, the same political and legal understanding, a shared desire to form an alliance with France and a shared opposition to the city of St. Gallen. This shared opposition to St. Gallen was demonstrated in the so-called linen affairs (1535–42, 1579), when the weavers throughout Appenzell supported each other when they felt that they were unfairly treated by the linen industry of St. Gallen.

After this time, the term Kanton Appenzell continued to refer to both half-cantons, although this usage has since become outdated. Usually die beiden Appenzell ("the two Appenzells") are spoken of in a political context, and Appenzellerland in a geographic context, if the aim is to refer to Innerrhoden and Ausserrhoden collectively.

From 1798 to 1803 Appenzell, with the other domains of the abbot of St Gall, was formed into the canton of Säntis of the Helvetic Republic, but in 1803, on the creation of the new canton of St. Gallen, shrank back within its former boundaries.

=== Early Modern Appenzell ===
From the 16th century onwards, linen production was established little by little. Larger textile businesses established themselves, later diversifying into weaving and embroidery. The textile industry collapsed between 1920 and 1939.

In 1834, a constitution was adapted, undergoing reforms in 1876 and 1908. The construction of numerous railway lines between 1875 and 1913 helped the local industry and the population grew to a maximum of 57,973 people in 1910 (compared with 53,200 in 2001). In 1934 Johannes Baumann was the first citizen from Appenzell Ausserrhoden to become a federal councilor. Women's right to vote was introduced in 1972 on a local level, but only in 1989 on a canton-wide level. In 1994 for the first time two women were elected into government. The open assembly (Landsgemeinde) was abolished in 1997. The Landsgemeinde still convenes in Appenzell Inerrhoden. The right of foreigners to vote is determined by each municipality.

== Geography ==
The canton is mountainous, being located in the Alpine foothills (Swiss Plateau) and Appenzell Alps. The Säntis peak (Alpstein massif) is the canton's highest point, shared with the neighbouring cantons of Appenzell Innerrhoden and St. Gallen. The main rivers are the Urnäsch, Sitter and Goldach. The geographical centre of Appenzell Ausserrhoden is located in the neighbouring canton of Appenzell Innerrhoden.

== Municipalities ==
The 20 municipalities (Einwohnergemeinden) are:

- Bühler
- Gais
- Grub
- Heiden
- Herisau
- Hundwil
- Lutzenberg
- Rehetobel
- Reute
- Schönengrund
- Schwellbrunn
- Speicher
- Stein
- Teufen
- Trogen
- Urnäsch
- Wald
- Waldstatt
- Walzenhausen
- Wolfhalden

== Demographics ==
The population of the canton (as of 31 December 2020) is 55,309. As of 2007, the population included 6,959 foreigners, or about 13.22% of the total population. Due to the split of Appenzell, the majority of the population (as of 2000) is Protestant (51%) with a Roman Catholic minority (31%).

=== Historical population ===
The historical population is given in the following table:

Historic Population Data
Year	Total Population	Swiss	Non-Swiss	Population share of total country
1850	43,621	43,169	452	1.8%
1900	55,281	52,643	2,638	1.7%
1950	47,938	45,813	2,125	1.0%
1990	52,229	44,619	7,610	0.8%
2020	55,309			

== Politics ==
=== Federal election results ===
Percentage of the total vote per party in the canton in the Federal Elections 1971-2015
Party	Ideology	1971	1975	1979	1983	1987	1991	1995	1999	2003	2007	2011	2015
FDP.The Liberals^{a}	Classical liberalism	62.6	45.8	^{c}	36.0	^{c}	30.8	36.4	32.8	41.1	72.0	51.5	33.6
CVP/PDC/PPD/PCD	Christian democracy	* ^{b}	14.1	^{c}	14.5	^{c}	16.7	9.5	*	*	*	10.6	*
SP/PS	Social democracy	37.4	40.1	^{c}	23.6	^{c}	*	21.9	29.6	19.9	*	*	28.6
SVP/UDC	Swiss nationalism/ Right-wing populism	*	*	^{c}	*	^{c}	*	22.0	37.5	38.3	*	30.5	36.1
GPS/PES	Green politics	*	*	^{c}	*	^{c}	*	*	*	*	*	6.4	*
FPS/PSL	Right-wing populism	*	*	^{c}	*	^{c}	15.8	8.9	*	*	*	*	*
Other		*	*	^{c}	25.9	^{c}	36.7	1.2	*	0.8	28.0	1.0	1.8
Voter participation %		48.5	44.2	^{c}	41.4	^{c}	44.5	48.8	51.2	49.3	33.3	47.5	47.1

^a FDP before 2009, FDP.The Liberals after 2009
^b "*" indicates that the party was not on the ballot in this canton.
^c No election held

== Transport ==
Regional rail in Appenzell Ausserrhoden and neighbouring areas is provided by St. Gallen S-Bahn, with some services also being part of the Bodensee S-Bahn. Services are operated by Appenzell Railways (Appenzeller Bahnen, AB), Südostbahn (SOB) and Thurbo. Herisau is a nodal station also served by long-distance InterRegio and medium-distance RegioExpress trains. PostAuto buses serve towns and villages within the canton. Rail and bus services operate within the Ostwind tariff network.

The nearest airports are St. Gallen–Altenrhein Airport and Zurich Airport.

== See also ==
- List of castles and fortresses in Switzerland
- Alfred Altherr
