= List of mayors of St. Gallen =

Coat of arms of St. Gallen

This is a list of mayors (Stadtpräsident) of St. Gallen, Switzerland.

== Recent ==
Mayor of St. Gallen
Term	Mayor	Lifespan	Party	Notes
1918–1930	Eduard Scherrer	(1862–1947)		
1930–1948	Konrad Naegeli	(1881–1951)		
1948–1967	Emil Anderegg	(1903–1967)	FDP/PRD	
1968–1980	Alfred Hummler	(1915–2010)	FDP/PRD	
1981–2004	Heinz Christen	(1941–2011)	SPS/PSS	
2005–2006	Franz Hagmann	(1941–2008)	CVP/PDC	
2006–2020	Thomas Scheitlin	(born 1953)	FDP/PRD	
2021–present	Maria Pappa	(born 1971)	SPS/PSS	

== Earlier ==
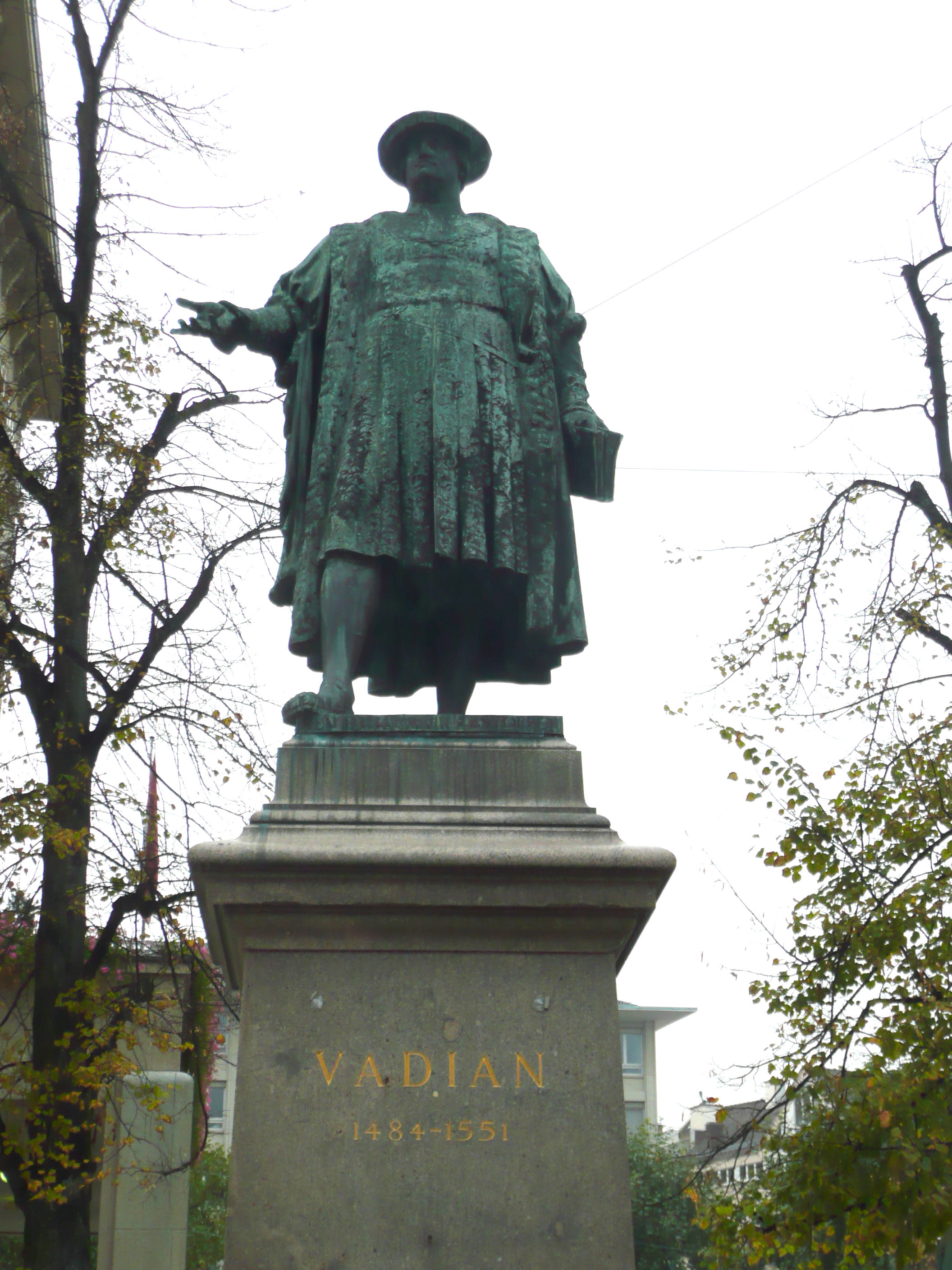
Statue of Vadian

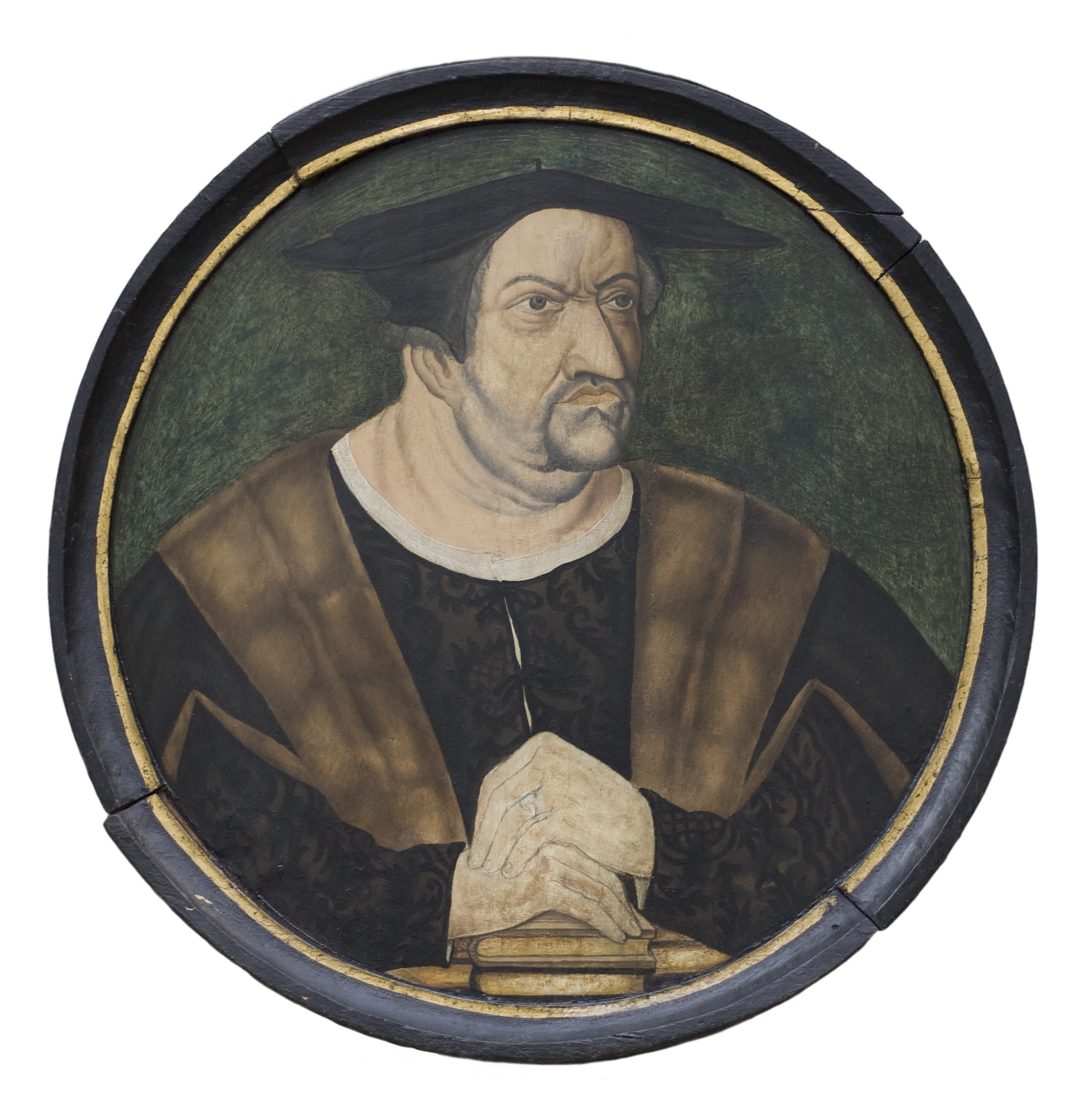
Vadian

The offices of mayor ("Amtsbürgermeister"), "Altbürgermeister" and "Reichsvogt" used to be held by three persons, alternating the offices every year.

Mayor of St. Gallen
Term	Mayor	Lifespan	Party	Notes
	Ulrich Varnbüler	(1432–1496)		
1526–	Vadian	(1484–1551)		
1699–1700 (3rd)	Ulrich Weyermann	(1626–1702)		
1700–1701 (5th)	Heinrich Hiller	(1633–1719)		Held the three offices 1687–1717
1701–1702 (1st)	Laurenz Werder	(1646–1720)		Held the three offices 1700–1720
1702–1703 (1st)	Georg Wartmann	(1645–1727)		Held the three offices 1702–1725
1703–1704 (6th)	Heinrich Hiller	(1633–1719)		
1704–1705 (2nd)	Laurenz Werder	(1646–1720)		
1705–1706 (2nd)	Georg Wartmann	(1645–1727)		
1706–1707 (7th)	Heinrich Hiller	(1633–1719)		
1707–1708 (3rd)	Laurenz Werder	(1646–1720)		
1708–1709 (3rd)	Georg Wartmann	(1645–1727)		
1709–1710 (8th)	Heinrich Hiller	(1633–1719)		
1710–1711 (4th)	Laurenz Werder	(1646–1720)		
1711–1712 (4th)	Georg Wartmann	(1645–1727)		
1712–1713 (9th)	Heinrich Hiller	(1633–1719)		
1713–1714 (5th)	Laurenz Werder	(1646–1720)		
1714–1715 (5th)	Georg Wartmann	(1645–1727)		
1715–1716 (10th)	Heinrich Hiller	(1633–1719)		
1716–1717 (6th)	Laurenz Werder	(1646–1720)		
1717–1718 (6th)	Georg Wartmann	(1645–1727)		
1718–1719 (1st)	Christoph Hochreutiner	(1662–1742)		Held the three offices 1717–1742
1719–1720 (7th)	Laurenz Werder	(1646–1720)		
1720–1721 (7th)	Georg Wartmann	(1645–1727)		
1721–1722 (2nd)	Christoph Hochreutiner	(1662–1742)		
1722–1723 (1st)	Jakob Züblin	(1653–1729)		
1723 (8th)	Georg Wartmann	(1645–1727)		
1724 (3rd)	Christoph Hochreutiner	(1662–1742)		
1725 (2nd)	Jakob Züblin	(1653–1729)		
1726 (1st)	David Stähelin	(1673–1750)		Held the three offices 1725–1740
1727 (4th)	Christoph Hochreutiner	(1662–1742)		
1728 (3rd)	Jakob Züblin	(1653–1729)		
1729 (2nd)	David Stähelin	(1673–1750)		
1730 (5th)	Christoph Hochreutiner	(1662–1742)		
1731 (1st)	Hans Jacob Rietmann	(1677–1756)		Held the three offices 1729–1756
1732 (3rd)	David Stähelin	(1673–1750)		
1733 (2nd)	Hans Jacob Rietmann	(1677–1756)		
1734 (6th)	Christoph Hochreutiner	(1662–1742)		
1735 (4th)	David Stähelin	(1673–1750)		
1736 (3rd)	Hans Jacob Rietmann	(1677–1756)		
1737 (7th)	Christoph Hochreutiner	(1662–1742)		
1738 (5th)	David Stähelin	(1673–1750)		
1739 (4th)	Hans Jacob Rietmann	(1677–1756)		
1740 (1st)	Friedrich Girtanner	(1674–1753)		Held the three offices 1740–1753
1741 (6th)	David Stähelin	(1673–1750)		
1742 (1st)	Kaspar von Fels	(1668–1752)		Held the three offices 1742–1752
1743 (2nd)	Friedrich Girtanner	(1674–1753)		
1744 (2nd)	Kaspar von Fels	(1668–1752)		
1745 (5th)	Hans Jacob Rietmann	(1677–1756)		
1746 (3rd)	Friedrich Girtanner	(1674–1753)		
1747 (3rd)	Kaspar von Fels	(1668–1752)		
1748 (6th)	Hans Jacob Rietmann	(1677–1756)		
1749 (4th)	Friedrich Girtanner	(1674–1753)		
1750 (4th)	Kaspar von Fels	(1668–1752)		
1751 (7th)	Hans Jacob Rietmann	(1677–1756)		
1752 (5th)	Kaspar von Fels	(1668–1752)		
1752 (1st)	Caspar Bernet	(1698–1766)		Held the three offices 1752–1764
1753	Johannes Vonwiller	(1691–1754)		
1754 (2nd)	Caspar Bernet	(1698–1766)		
1755 (8th)	Hans Jacob Rietmann	(1677–1756)		
1756 (1st)	Daniel Högger	(1706–1784)		Held the three offices 1754–1783
1757 (3rd)	Caspar Bernet	(1698–1766)		
1758	Christoph Wegelin	(1688–1774)		
1759 (4th)	Caspar Bernet	(1698–1766)		
1760 (1st)	Hans Joachim Steinmann	(1703–1792)		Held the three offices 1760–1792
1761 (2nd)	Daniel Högger	(1706–1784)		
1762 (5th)	Caspar Bernet	(1698–1766)		
1763 (2nd)	Hans Joachim Steinmann	(1703–1792)		
1764 (3rd)	Daniel Högger	(1706–1784)		
1765 (1st)	Heinrich Schlumpf	(1702–1783)		Held the three offices 1764–1783
1766 (3rd)	Hans Joachim Steinmann	(1703–1792)		
1767 (4th)	Daniel Högger	(1706–1784)		
1768 (2nd)	Heinrich Schlumpf	(1702–1783)		
1769 (4th)	Hans Joachim Steinmann	(1703–1792)		
1770 (5th)	Daniel Högger	(1706–1784)		
1771 (3rd)	Heinrich Schlumpf	(1702–1783)		
1772 (5th)	Hans Joachim Steinmann	(1703–1792)		
1773 (6th)	Daniel Högger	(1706–1784)		
1774 (4th)	Heinrich Schlumpf	(1702–1783)		
1775 (6th)	Hans Joachim Steinmann	(1703–1792)		
1776 (7th)	Daniel Högger	(1706–1784)		
1777 (5th)	Heinrich Schlumpf	(1702–1783)		
1778 (7th)	Hans Joachim Steinmann	(1703–1792)		
1779 (8th)	Daniel Högger	(1706–1784)		
1780 (6th)	Heinrich Schlumpf	(1702–1783)		
1781 (8th)	Hans Joachim Steinmann	(1703–1792)		
1782 (9th)	Daniel Högger	(1706–1784)		
1783 (1st)	Julius Hieronymus Zollikofer	(1713–1802)		Held the three offices 1783–1795
1784 (9th)	Hans Joachim Steinmann	(1703–1792)		
1785 (1st)	Hans Joachim Bernet	(1725–1809)		Held the three offices 1785–1794
1786 (2nd)	Julius Hieronymus Zollikofer	(1713–1802)		
1787 (10th)	Hans Joachim Steinmann	(1703–1792)		
1788 (2nd)	Hans Joachim Bernet	(1725–1809)		
1789 (3rd)	Julius Hieronymus Zollikofer	(1713–1802)		
1790 (11th)	Hans Joachim Steinmann	(1703–1792)		
1791 (3rd)	Hans Joachim Bernet	(1725–1809)		
1792 (4th)	Julius Hieronymus Zollikofer	(1713–1802)		
1793 (1st)	Paulus Züblin	(1736–1809)		
1794 (1st)	Caspar Steinlin	(1740–1814)		
1795	Daniel Girtanner	(1733–1798)		
1796 (2nd)	Paulus Züblin	(1736–1809)		
1797 (2nd)	Caspar Steinlin	(1740–1814)		
1798 – 29 Apr 1798	Johann Kaspar Girtanner			
1802	Caspar Steinlin	(1740–1814)		
