= Song of Moses =

Poem in Deuteronomy 32 of the Hebrew Bible

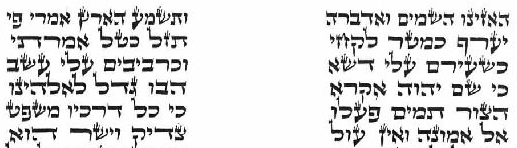
Hebrew Bible text of Deuteronomy 32:1–4 as written in a Jewish Sefer Torah.

The Song of Moses (hebrew: שירת האזינו, Širat ha-ʾĂzīnū) is the poem which appears in Deuteronomy of the Hebrew Bible, which according to the Bible was delivered just prior to Moses' death on Mount Nebo. Sometimes the Song is referred to as Deuteronomy 32, despite the fact that Deuteronomy chapter 32 contains nine verses (44–52) which are not part of the Song.

Most scholars hold that it was composed between the tenth and eighth centuries BCE, although dates as early as the twelfth century or as late as the fifth have been proposed.

== Biblical narrative ==
According to verses 16–18 of Deuteronomy 31, YHWH met with Moses and his nominated successor Joshua at the "tabernacle of meeting" and told them that after Moses' death, the people of Israel would renege on the covenant that YHWH had made with them, and worship the gods of the lands they were occupying. YHWH told Moses to write down the words of a song and teach it to the community, so that it would be a "witness for Me against the children of Israel." Verse 22 states that Moses did as he had been instructed, and in verse 30 he then "spoke in the hearing of all the assembly of Israel the words of this song until they were ended".

The Song opens with an exordium (verses 1–3) in which heaven and earth are summoned to hear what the poet is to utter. In verses 4–6 the theme is defined: it is the rectitude and faithfulness of YHWH toward His corrupt and faithless people. Verses 7–14 portray the providence which conducted Israel in safety through the wilderness and gave it a rich and fertile land. Verses 15–18 are devoted to Israel's unfaithfulness and lapse into idolatry. This lapse had compelled YHWH to threaten it (verses 19–27) with national disaster and almost with national extinction. Verses 28–43 describe how YHWH has determined to speak to the Israelites through the extremity of their need, to lead them to a better mind, and to grant them victory over their foes.

In a Torah scroll the song is written with a special layout, in two parallel columns.

== Critical view ==
The parallelism is unusually regular.

The general plan of the poem resembles that of Psalm 78, 105, and 106, and the prose of Ezekiel 29, as well as the allegories of Ezekiel 26 and 33.

The poem opening verse is also echoed in the opening of Isaiah.

== Scholarly views ==
According to the modern documentary hypothesis the poem was an originally separate text that was inserted by the deuteronomist into the second edition (of 2), of the text which became Deuteronomy (i.e., was an addition in 'Dtr2').

The poem, cast partly in the future tense, describes how Yahweh is provoked into punishing the Israelites due to their apostasy, resulting in the Israelites being destroyed. Dtr2 is believed to have been produced as a reaction to the Kingdom of Judah being sent into its Babylonian exile, and thus to Dtr1's (the hypothesised first edition of Deuteronomy) positive outlook, and suggestion of an upcoming golden age, being somewhat no longer appropriate. Consequently, the poem fits the aim of Dtr2, in retroactively accounting for Israel's misfortune, and, indeed, may have been composed at a similar time.

Though both Jewish and Christian sources have traditionally attributed the Song to Moses, the conditions presupposed by the poem render the Mosaic authorship of it impossible according to critical commentary. The Exodus and the wilderness wanderings lie in the distant past. The writer's contemporaries may learn of them from their fathers (verse 7). The Israelites are settled in Canaan (verses 13–14); sufficient time has passed for them not only to fall into idolatry (verses 15–19), but to be brought to the verge of ruin. They are pressed hard by heathen foes (verse 30); but Yahweh promises to interpose and rescue his people (verses 34–43).

=== Dating the Song ===
There are differences of opinion as to precisely when and by whom the song was written. George E. Mendenhall from the University of Michigan assigns it to the period just after the defeat of the Israelite militia at the battle of Eben-Ezer, and its authorship to the prophet Samuel:

"The poem cannot have originated at any time than after the destruction of Shiloh" and "... there is an impressive number of linguistic correlations in this text with the language and idioms of the syllabic texts from Byblos; those correlations also cluster around Exodus 15, Judges 5, Deuteronomy 33, and Genesis 49".

When all of Deuteronomy 31:14–23 was referred to JE, the poem was believed to be anterior thereto, and was believed to be contemporary with the Assyrian wars under Jehoash and Jeroboam II (c. 780 BCE). To this period it is referred by August Dillmann, Schrader, Samuel Oettli, Heinrich Ewald, Adolf Kamphausen and Edouard Guillaume Eugène Reuss. Kuenen and Driver, who believe that the expression "those which are not a people" in verse 21 refers to the Assyrians, assign the poem to the age of Jeremiah and Ezekiel (c. 630 BCE); while Cornill, Steuernagel, and Bertholet refer it to the closing years of the Exile, i.e., the period of the second Isaiah.

=== Similarity to other places in the Old Testament ===
Isaiah 1:2 begins similar to Deuteronomy 32:1 by calling on heaven and earth as witnesses, making Isaiah's introduction in the style of the Song of Moses.

Psalm 50 in Psalm 50:1 and Psalm 50:4 will also begin the same as Deuteronomy 32:1, making that Psalm poetically also in the style of the Song of Moses.

Deuteronomy 32:8-9 is often taken alongside Psalm 82 to be evidence of an older, pre-Monotheistic theology that existed in Ancient Israel.

== Musical settings ==
- Audite cæli quæ loquor, grand motet, S.7 by Michel Richard Delalande.
- Audite caeli by Francesco Provenzale.

Both Songs of Moses, as with Habakkuk 3 (Domine Audivi), and 1 Samuel 2 (Exultavit Cor Meum) are counted as canticles in church use.

== See also ==
- Territorial spirit
- Haazinu
