= Maria Pappa =

Swiss politician (born 1971)

Mayor of St. Gallen
- Incumbent
- Assumed office January 2021
- Preceded by: Thomas Scheitlin

Personal details
- Born: 1971 (age 54–55) St. Gallen, Canton of St. Gallen, Switzerland
- Party: Social Democratic Party
- Occupation: politician, social worker
- Website: maria-pappa.ch

Maria Pappa (born 1971) is a Swiss-Italian politician. A member of the Social Democratic Party of Switzerland, she was elected to the City Parliament of St. Gallen in 2013 and to the St. Gallen City Council in 2017. As a city councilor, she served as Head of the Planning and Construction Directorate. In 2020, she became the first woman, and the first Seconda, to be elected as Mayor of St. Gallen. Upon taking office in 2021, she heads the city's Interior and Finance Directorate.

== Early life and education ==
Pappa was born in St. Gallen in 1971. Her parents, Michele and Saveria Pappa, immigrated to Switzerland from Calabria in the 1960s. She was raised Catholic. As a child, Pappa spoke Italian and did not learn German until she was in primary school.

Upon completing her secondary education, Pappa attended business school and worked as an accountant. She went back to school to study social work.

== Career ==
Pappa became a member of the Social Democratic Party of Switzerland in 2012. She was elected to the St. Gallen city parliament in 2013 and was appointed to the audit commission. In 2017, she was elected to the city council, where she became the head of the planning and construction directorate.

In November 2020, Pappa was elected as the first woman and first Seconda mayor of St. Gallen. Pappa defeated Mathias Gabathuler in the mayoral race. She took office in 2021, succeeding the FDP politician Thomas Scheitlin. Her term will last from 2021 until 2024.

== Personal life ==
Pappa became a naturalized citizen of Switzerland in 2010 so that she could be politically active. She is a dual citizen of Italy and Switzerland.

She is a practicing Catholic. She was involved with the Blauring St. Gallenkappel and served on the pastoral and deanery council.
