= Secondo (disambiguation) =

Secondo may refer to:

- Secondo, a term for the children of immigrants
- secondo, the second course of the Italian meal structure
- secondo, the second part of a Piano four hands duet
- "Secondo" (Hannibal)
