= Paul Hans Tobler =

Swiss metalworking entrepreneur

- Born: 11 April 1923; St. Gallen, Switzerland
- Died: 28 February 2023 (aged 99); St. Gallen, Switzerland
- Occupation: Entrepreneur

Paul Hans Tobler (11 April 1923 – 28 February 2023) was a Swiss entrepreneur who ran the family metalworking firm Paul Tobler & Co. in St. Gallen.

== Biography ==
Tobler was born on 11 April 1923 in St. Gallen, the son of Paul Tobler, owner of the Traugott Tobler & Sohn locksmith's workshop founded in 1836, and Luise (née Engler). In 1949 he married Alice Giger, daughter of Emil Giger.

Tobler completed a locksmith's apprenticeship in Bern, working in metal craftsmanship. In 1941 he joined his father's business, which in 1946 was reorganized as a limited partnership under the name Paul Tobler & Co.; he was its sole owner from 1946 to 1982. In 1957 he had a new building constructed at Winkeln in St. Gallen, which he sought to promote as an industrial center; it was enlarged in 1960 and 1974. Tobler withdrew from the firm in 1980, having given the company an industrial character in metallurgy.

In 1991 the company was split into two entities: Tobler Stahlbau AG (renamed Tobler Elementa AG in 2004, active in real estate and led since 2020 by the sixth generation of the family) and Tobler Metallbau AG (sold in 2010 to Ernst Schweizer AG). Tobler died on 28 February 2023 in St. Gallen.

== Bibliography ==
E. Ziegler, Aus der Geschichte der Familie Tobler, [1986]
