= Mathias Braschler and Monika Fischer =

Swiss photographers

braschler/fischer
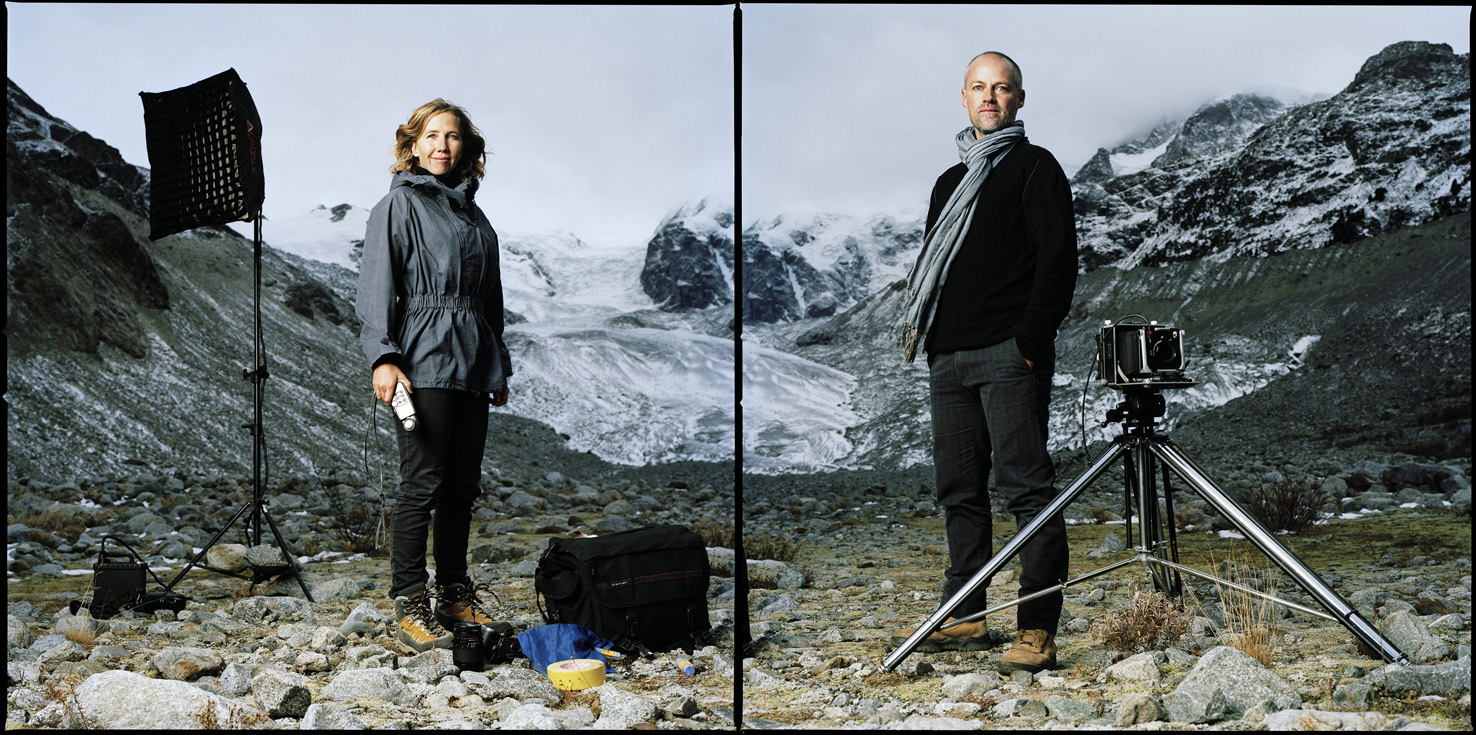
- braschler/fischer on assignment in Cuba. Image by braschler/fischer
- Born: Mathias Braschler: October 31, 1969 Monika Fischer: May 15, 1971
- Occupation: Photographers
- Known for: Portrait photography, Impact photography
- Website: braschlerfischer.com

Mathias Braschler and Monika Fischer, aka braschler/fischer are Swiss photographers known for portrait projects and photographic environmental activism.

In 2003, braschler/fischer started collaborating as a photography team while developing the portrait project „About Americans". In the following years, braschler/fischer created portraits of humans from all backgrounds and cultures. „Faces of Football", a series of portraits of the world’s most important soccer players, „China“, portraits of people from all social backgrounds and regions of China, and „Affected – The Human Face of Climate Change“, a series of environmental portraits from around the world, are among their largest projects. Their project “Act Now!", a portrait series of famous climate activists to raise awareness at the 2015 climate negotiations in Paris, was created in close collaboration with the United Nations.

For their international work, the duo visits remote places, such as the island state of Kiribati or Tuktoyaktuk in the far North of Canada. The types of people braschler/fischer capture range from celebrities like David Beckham to nomadic farmers in the Sahel Zone.

braschler/fischer have won numerous awards for their works, including a World Press Photo Award in 2007. Their photography projects appear internationally and have been published in The Guardian, Vanity Fair and Stern, as well as in photo books (see below). Their work has been exhibited in Europe, Asia, and the Americas.

== Biographies ==
Mathias Braschler was born in Aargau, Switzerland, in 1969. He studied geography and modern history at the University of Zurich. He was strongly touched by a photographic exhibition of Sebastiao Salgado and learned from photographer and filmmaker Alberto Venzago before beginning his career in photography in 1994. Starting out as a photo journalist, he worked for various magazines and newspapers such as NZZ and Sonntags Zeitung in Switzerland before moving to New York City in 1998, where he carried out his first book project, Madison Avenue in 1999. Through his experience of covering 9/11 for Newsweek, Mathias Braschler decided to move more into portrait photography. In the following years he lived and worked in New York.

Monika Fischer was born in St. Gallen’s Rhine Valley in Switzerland in 1971. While studying Romance and German philology at the University of Zurich, she also began working as a dramaturg and director's assistant at the Zürich opera house. Over several years she worked with international theatre directors in Switzerland. Monika Fischer graduated from the Zurich University of the Arts with an executive master in scenography in 2005. Her experience in lighting and mis-en-scene is an important part of braschler/fischer's visual style.

The duo met while studying at university and first started working on a project based on the Werner Herzog Film Fitzcarraldo for the Opera house of Manaus, Brazil in 2002. Their work relationship evolved into the formation of a permanent team, and they became the duo braschler/fischer in 2003.

They have a son and divide their time between Zürich and New York.

== Work and projects ==
Braschler/fischer work project-based, with projects usually lasting several months to two years and requiring extensive travel. Braschler/fischer always work as a team and are specialized in portrait photography. Strongly influenced by the works of Sebastiao Salgado, Richard Avedon, Robert Capa, Werner Bischof and Henri Cartier-Bresson, and having been compared to August Sander, braschler/fischer have developed a style that balances between illuminating the subject while telling their true story.

They apply this style to a variety of topics:

=== Socio-geographic ===
A whole country is portrayed by showing a variety of typical members of a country’s society. Usually braschler/fischer accomplish this task through extensive road trips. For example, they covered more than 30.000 km in seven months in China to portray 172 people.

Published projects: About Americans China The Swiss

=== Environmental ===
To raise awareness on environmental issues, braschler/fischer create portraits of humans who are affected by them, such as people affected by climate change, or known activists. Published projects: The Human Face of Climate Change, Act Now!

=== Sports ===
Fascinated by sports, and especially soccer, braschler/fischer have portrayed a large number of athletes, notably soccer players such as David Beckham as part of the series "Faces of Football”

Published projects: Faces of Football, South Africa Football, O Pais do Futebol, Olympic Projects

=== Guantanamo ===
In this award-winning work, braschler/fischer show former Guantamo inmates.

=== Portraits and landscape juxtaposition ===
In this series, portraits on a neutral background and the related landscape are juxtaposed. Published Projects: Okinawa, Everest

== Book publications ==
- 1999 – Madison Avenue, Edition Andreas Züst, ISBN 3-905328-16-X
- 2007 – About Americans, Edition Braus, ISBN 978-3-89904-275-7
- 2006 – Faces of Football, Nicolai Verlag, (ISBN 3-89479-324-4)
- 2010 – The Human Face of Climate Change
- 2012 – China
- 2013 – Faces!
- 2013 – The Swiss

== Recognitions ==
After five years of collaboration, braschler/fischer won a World Press Photo Award for "Faces of Football" in 2007. Featuring known soccer players such as David Beckham, the idea was to shoot the athlete right after the match, which created a certain intensity of the gaze. For their project "The Human Face of Climate Change", braschler/fischer were selected photographers for the Vanity Fair Hall of Fame in 2010. For the series "Guantanamo", braschler/fischer were awarded the Hansel Mieth Prize in 2012 and the Prix Photo in 2015. Braschler/fischers distinct photographic style and way of working has been covered by The New York Times, Stern and the Guardian
