= Hans Jacob Rietmann =

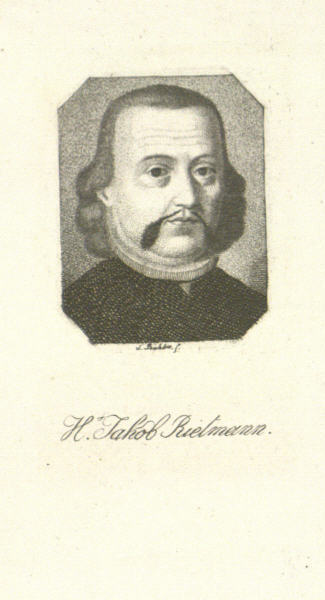

Mayor (Amtsbürgermeister/Altbürgermeister, triennial rotation)
- In office 1729–1756

Deputy Mayor
- In office 1725–1729

Weavers' guild master
- In office 1721–1725

Personal details
- Born: June 5, 1677 St. Gallen, Old Swiss Confederacy
- Died: June 22, 1756 (aged 79) St. Gallen, Old Swiss Confederacy
- Spouse: 1) Katharina Rohner (d. 1721) 2) Weibratha Weyermann 3) Elsbetha Zollikofer
- Occupation: Civic magistrate; guild official

Hans Jacob Rietmann (St. Gallen, 1677 – St. Gallen, 1756) was a Swiss politician and merchant, and a member of the patrician Rietmann family. Considered one of the most influential statesmen of the Republic of St. Gallen, he governed the city as mayor for twenty-seven years (1729–1756), distinguishing himself through a radical modernization of administrative and educational processes based on models of mercantile efficiency.

== Biography ==
=== Early life and economic career ===
The son of Jacob Rietmann (1633–1708), a city bailiff, and Dorothea Leu, he was raised within the patrician elite of St. Gallen. He trained as a merchant in the linen sector, the backbone of the city's economy at the time. His political ascent was preceded by a solid career in economic institutions.

- Weavers' Guild (Weberzunft): Having joined as a cloth quality inspector, he became the Guild Master (Zunftmeister) between 1721 and 1725. At the time, the guild was not merely a trade body but the primary organ of political representation.
- Collegium Mercatorum: He was a key figure in the Chamber of Commerce (founded in 1715), serving as its director. In this role, he coordinated international trade networks with hubs such as Lyon, Frankfurt am Main, and Amsterdam.
- Hospital Administration: As Spitalverwalter (Administrator of the Hospital of the Holy Spirit), he managed what was then the city's largest land-owning and welfare institution, applying rigorous budgetary criteria for the first time.

=== Political career and Mayoralty (1729–1756) ===
In 1720, he was elected a member of the Council of Eleven (Elfner), and from 1725 to 1729, he served as Deputy Mayor. In 1729, he was elected Mayor for the first time, a position he held until his death in 1756, exercising exceptionally long political dominance.

In accordance with the Zunftverfassung (Guild Constitution) of 1719, Rietmann exercised power through the "system of three mayors," rotating annually between the offices of Presiding Mayor (Amtsbürgermeister), Senior Mayor (Altbürgermeister), and Imperial Bailiff (Reichsvogt). During his tenure, he rotated initially with David Stähelin and Christoph Hochreutiner, then with Friedrich Girtanner and Kaspar von Fels, and finally with Johannes Vonwill and Caspar Bernet.

Rietmann maintained this balance for nearly three decades, ensuring a level of political stability for the city rarely matched in St. Gallen's history. Alongside his administrative duties, he held the prestigious office of city standard-bearer (Bannerherr), a role of great political and ceremonial significance.

== Reforms and foreign policy ==
=== Administrative modernization ===
Rietmann is considered a precursor to modern public management. His actions focused on the transition from "personal power" to "procedural power":

- Accounting Professionalization: He introduced double-entry bookkeeping to the municipal treasury and public institutions, a method borrowed from his mercantile experience, ensuring unprecedented financial transparency.
- Institutional Memory: He rationalized the maintenance of the Ratsmanuale (council minutes), transforming them into systematic archiving tools. This allowed for administrative continuity regardless of the annual rotation of mayors.
- Regulation: He replaced many oral customs with written regulations (market ordinances, customs tariffs, and police codes), reducing the scope for arbitrary decisions and corruption.

=== Educational Reform of 1733 ===
One of his most enduring legacies was the reform of the city's Gymnasium. Rietmann understood that the survival of a commercial city-state depended on the preparation of its future ruling class. The new regulation of 1733 introduced:

- The systematic study of mathematics and history alongside classical languages.
- The institutionalization of teacher salaries and examination criteria.
- A pedagogical approach aimed at training citizens capable of competing in European markets.

=== Diplomacy and conflicts ===
Rietmann managed the centuries-old tensions with the Prince-Abbot, the Catholic sovereign of the surrounding territory, with extreme pragmatism. Rather than resorting to direct or emotional confrontations (as occurred during the "War of the Crosses"), Rietmann enforced a line of legal diplomacy based on the research and archiving of ancient treaties and privileges, defending the autonomy of the Reformed city through the weight of legal documentation.

== Private life ==
He married three times, forming alliances with the region's most influential families:

1. In 1693, to Katharina Rohner (d. 1721).
2. In 1722, to Weibratha Weyermann, daughter of Mayor Ulrich Weyermann.
3. In 1737, to Elsbeth Zollikofer, of the Lords of Altenklingen and Nobles of the Holy Roman Empire and Denmark.

He had several children, including Jacob (1702–1782) and Pankraz (1706–1775), from his first wife, who continued the family tradition in the city's military and civil offices. Notably, Jacob served as Captain of the St. James quarter, and Pankraz took over the post in 1767.

== Bibliography ==
- August Naef, Chronik oder Denkwürdigkeiten der Stadt und Landschaft St. Gallen, Zurich/St. Gallen, 1867.
- Marcel Mayer, Hans Jacob Rietmann, in Historical Dictionary of Switzerland (HLS).
- Verena Sigrist, Das Schul-Donatorenbuch von St. Gallen, in Jahrbuch des Schweizer Archivs für Heraldik, 1973.
