= St. Gallen =

City in Switzerland

- Municipality
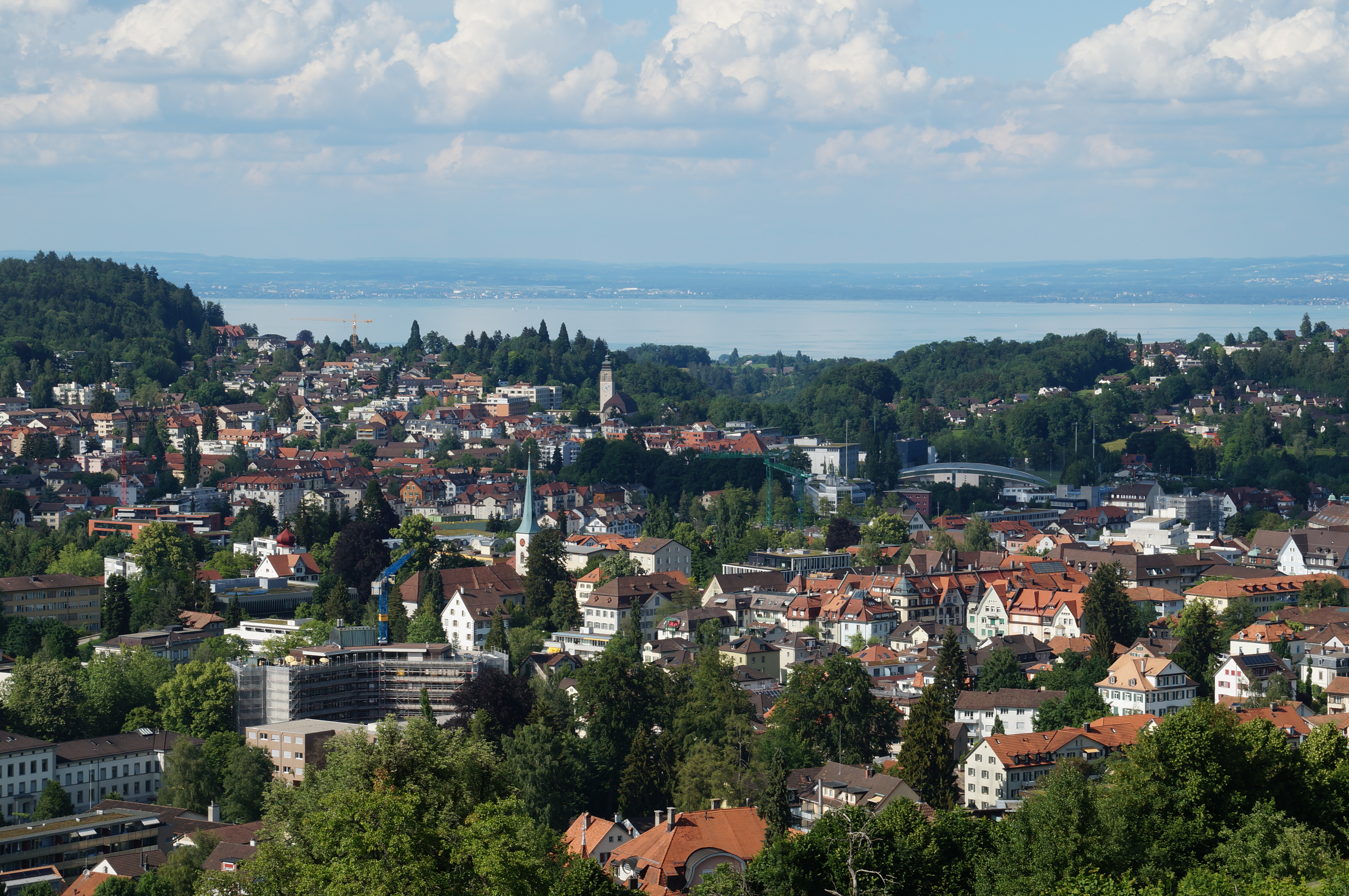
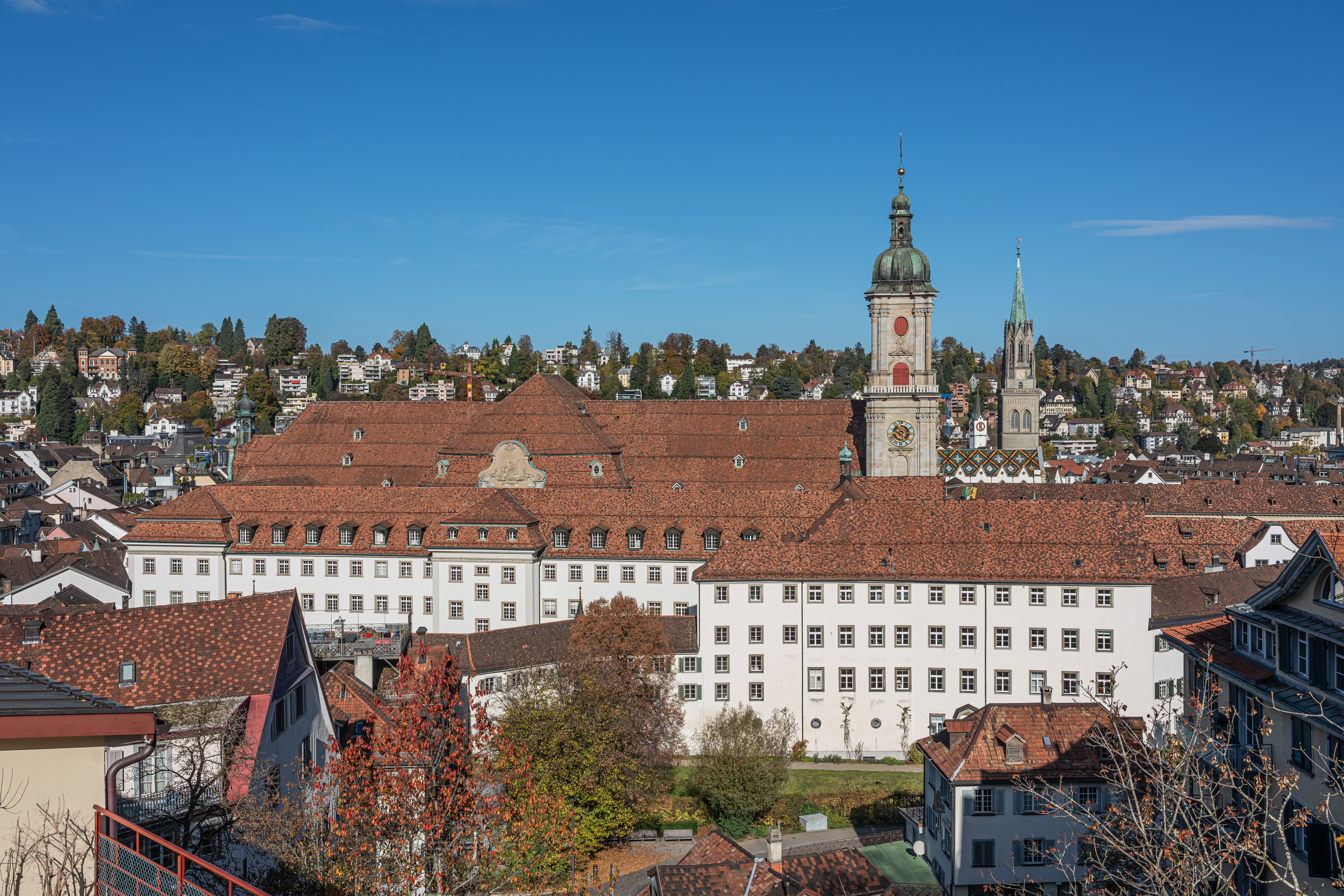
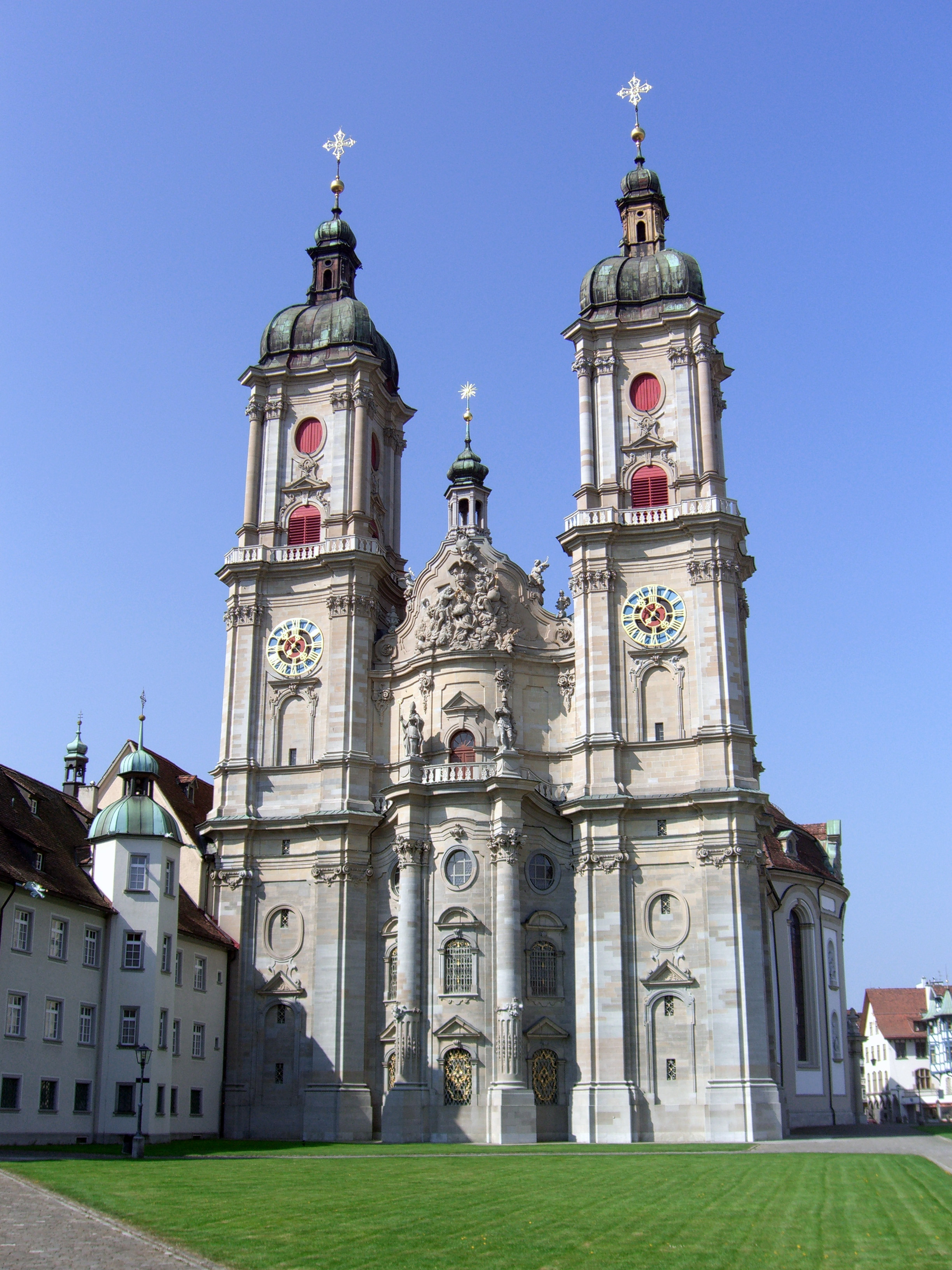
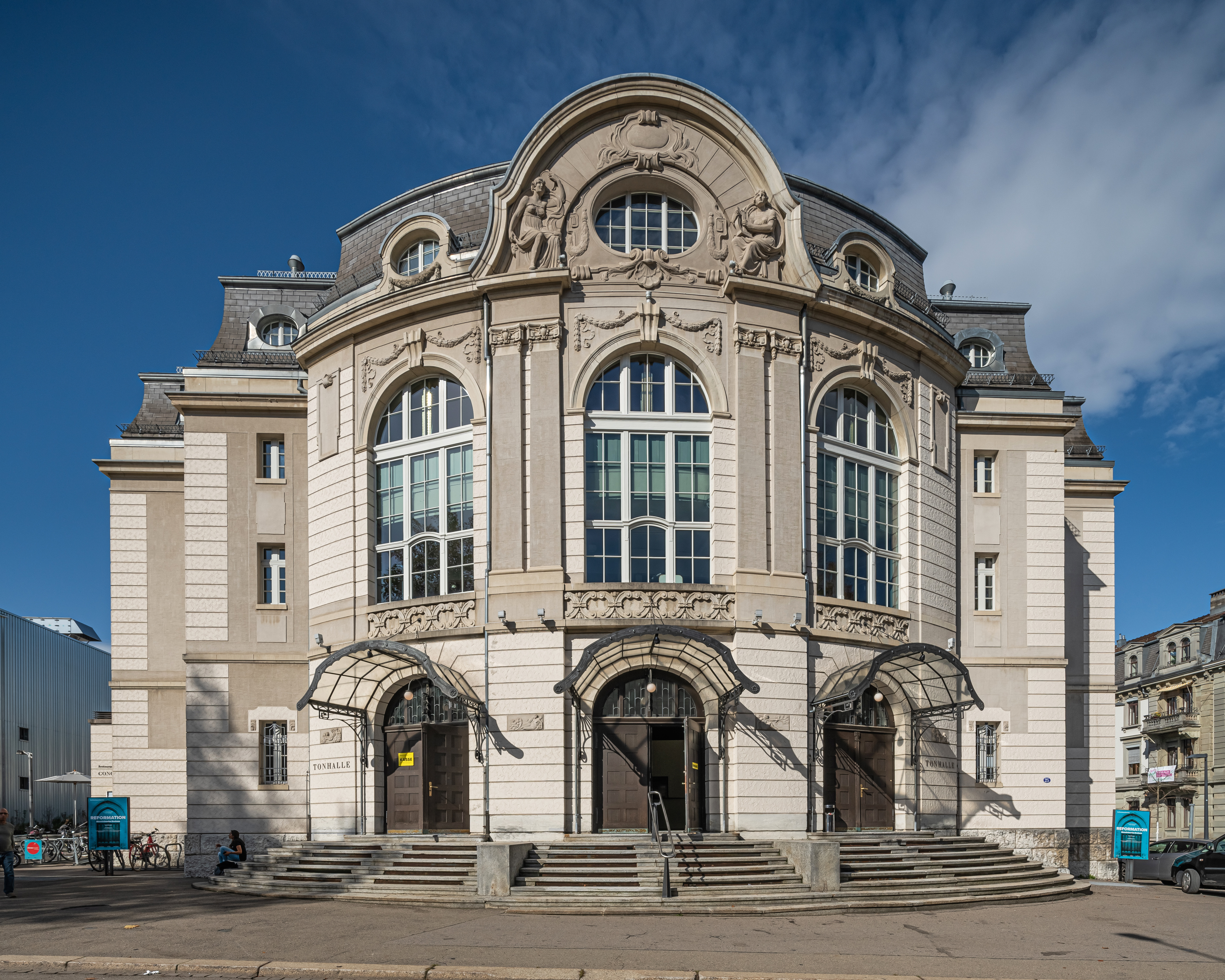
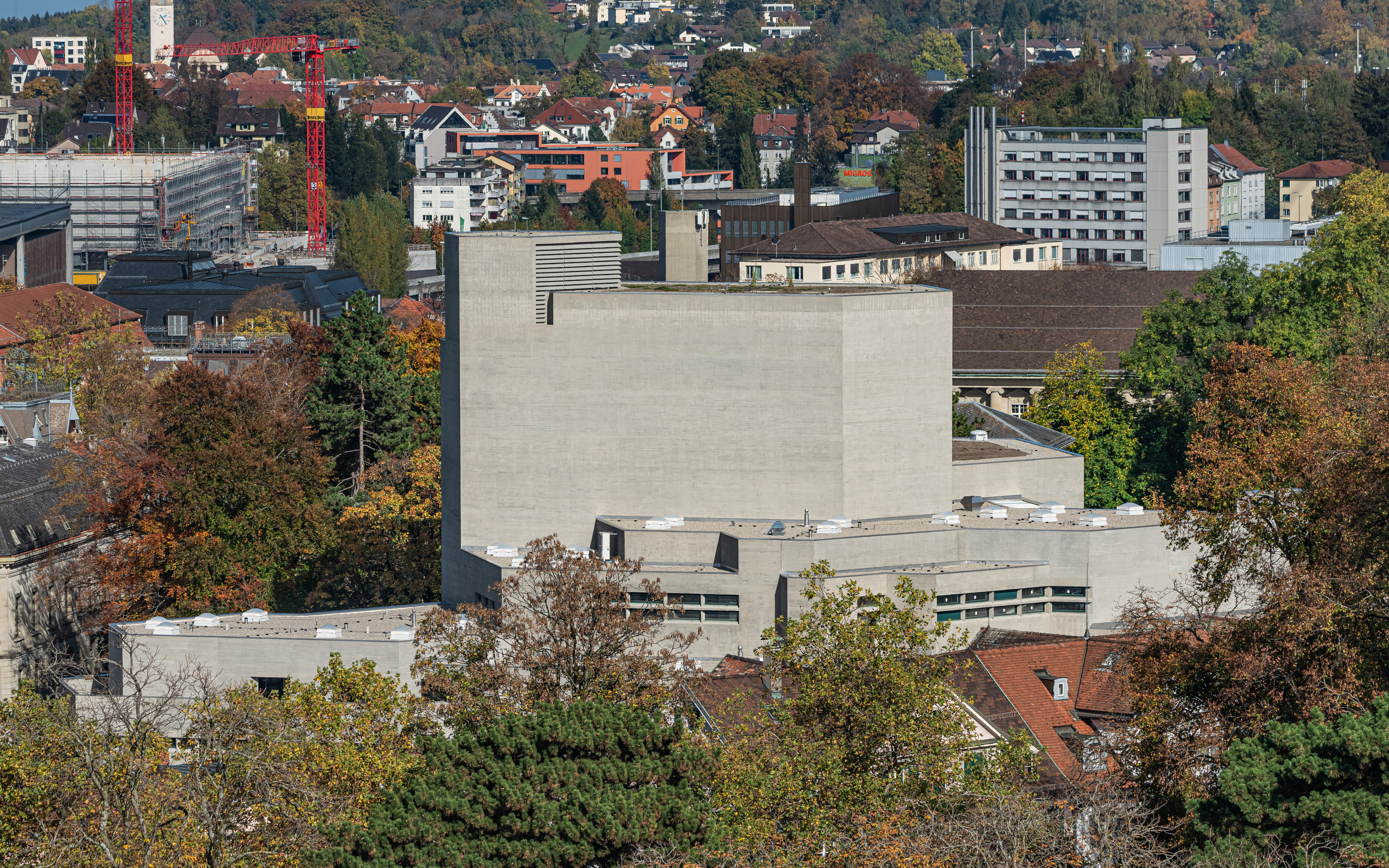
- View of St. Gallen Abbey of Saint Gall St. Gallen Cathedral Tonhalle St. Gallen Theater St. Gallen

- Flag Coat of arms
- Location of St. Gallen
- Location within Switzerland Location within Canton of St. Gallen
- Coordinates: 47°25′27″N 9°22′15″E
- Country: Switzerland
- Canton: St. Gallen
- District: St. Gallen

Government
  - Executive: Stadtrat with 5 members
  - Mayor: Stadtpräsidentin (list); Maria Pappa SPS/PSS (as of January 2021)
  - Parliament: Stadtparlament with 63 members

Area
  - Total: 39.38 km^{2} (15.20 sq mi)
- Elevation (Bahnhofsplatz): 669 m (2,195 ft)
- Highest elevation (Birt): 1,074 m (3,524 ft)
- Lowest elevation (Goldachtobel): 496 m (1,627 ft)

Population (December 2020)
  - Total: 76,213
  - Density: 1,935/km^{2} (5,012/sq mi)
- Demonym: German: Sankt-Galler(in)
- Time zone: UTC+01:00 (CET)
  - Summer (DST): UTC+02:00 (CEST)
- Postal codes: 9000, 9008, 9010-9012, 9014-9016 St. Gallen (partly: 9037 Speicherschwendi, 9042 Speicher)
- SFOS number: 3203
- ISO 3166 code: CH-SG
- Localities: Wolfganghof, Winkeln, Bruggen, Lachen, Rosenberg, Riethüsli, St. Georgen, Innenstadt, St. Jakob, Linsenbühl-Dreilinden, Rotmonten, Langgass-Heiligkreuz, St. Fiden, Notkersegg, Neudorf, Achslen, Guggeien
- Surrounded by: Eggersriet, Gaiserwald, Gossau, Herisau (AR), Mörschwil, Speicher (AR), Stein (AR), Teufen (AR), Untereggen, Wittenbach
- Twin towns: Liberec (Czech Republic)
- Website: www.stadt.sg.ch

St. Gallen (Note: German, sometimes spelled in full as Sankt Gallen, pronounced [zaŋkt ˈɡalən]; French: Saint-Gall [sɛ̃.ɡal]; Italian: San Gallo; Romansh: Son Gagl.) is a Swiss city and the capital of the canton of St. Gallen. It evolved from the hermitage of Saint Gall, founded in the 7th century. Today, it is a small urban agglomeration (with around 167,000 inhabitants in 2019) and represents the center of eastern Switzerland. Its economy consists mainly of the service sector. The city is home to the University of St. Gallen, one of the top 10 business schools in Europe.

The main tourist attraction is the Abbey of Saint Gall, a UNESCO World Heritage Site. The Abbey's library contains books from the 9th century. The city has good transport links to the rest of the country and to neighbouring Germany and Austria. It also functions as the gate to the Appenzellerland.

== History ==
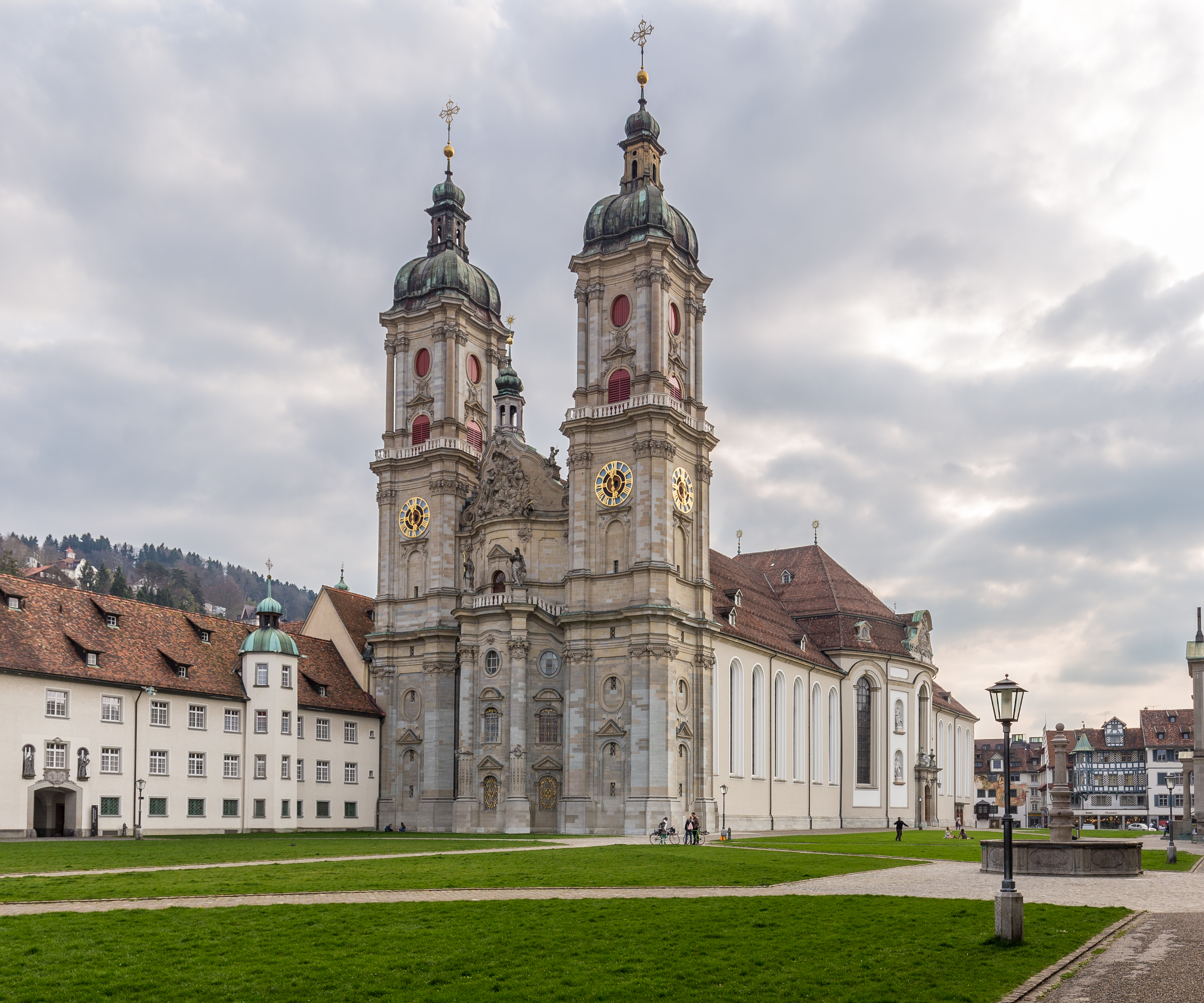
The Abbey Cathedral of Saint Gall

=== Early history ===
The town of St. Gallen grew around the Abbey of St Gall, built in the 8th century. The abbey is said to have been built at the site of the hermitage of Irish missionary Gallus, who according to legend had established himself by the river Steinach in AD 612. The monastery itself was founded by Saint Othmar in c. 720. The abbey prospered in the 9th century and became a site of pilgrimage and a center of trade, with associated guest houses, stables and other facilities, a hospital, one of the first monastery schools north of the Alps. By the tenth century, a settlement had grown up around the abbey.

In 926, Magyar raiders attacked the abbey and surrounding town. Saint Wiborada, the first woman formally canonized by the Vatican, reportedly saw a vision of the impending attack and warned the monks and citizens to flee. While the monks and the abbey treasure escaped, Wiborada chose to stay behind and was killed by the raiders. Between 924 and 933 the Magyars again threatened the abbey, and its books were removed for safekeeping to Reichenau. Not all the books were returned.

On 26 April 937, a fire consumed much of the abbey, spreading to the adjoining settlement. However, the library was spared. Muslim invaders occupied the abbey in 939. About 954 a protective wall was raised around the abbey. By 975, Abbot Notker finished the wall, and the adjoining settlement began growing into the town of St. Gall.

=== Independence from the Abbey ===
From the 12th century, the town of St. Gall increasingly pushed for independence from the abbey. In 1180, an imperial reeve, who was not answerable to the abbot, was installed in the town.

In 1207, Abbot Ulrich von Sax was granted the rank of Imperial Prince (Reichsfürst) by Philip of Swabia, King of the Germans. As an ecclesiastical principality, the Abbey of St. Gallen was to constitute an important territorial state and a major regional power in northern Switzerland.

The city of St. Gallen over time separated itself from the rule of the abbot. Abbot Wilhelm von Montfort in 1291 granted special privileges to the citizens. By about 1353 the guilds, headed by the cloth-weavers guild, had gained control of the civic government. In 1415 the city bought its liberty from the German king Sigismund.

=== Ally of the Swiss Confederacy ===
In 1405, the Appenzell estates of the abbot successfully rebelled and in 1411 they became allies of the Old Swiss Confederation. A few months later, the town of St. Gallen also became an ally. They joined the "everlasting alliance" as full members of the Confederation in 1454 and in 1457 became completely free from the abbot.

However, in 1451 the abbey became an ally of Zürich, Lucerne, Schwyz, and Glarus who were all members of the Confederation.

Ulrich Varnbüler was an early mayor of St. Gallen. Hans, the father of Ulrich, was prominent in city affairs in St. Gallen in the early 15th century. Ulrich entered public affairs in the early 1460s and attained the various offices and honours that are available to a talented and ambitious man. He demonstrated fine qualities as field commander of the St. Gallen troops in the Burgundian Wars.

In the Battle of Grandson (1476) his troops were part of the advance units of the Confederation and took part in their famous attack. A large painting of Ulrich returning triumphantly to a hero's welcome in St. Gallen is still displayed in St. Gallen.

After the war, Varnbüler often represented St. Gallen at the various parliaments of the Confederation. In December 1480, Varnbüler was offered the position of mayor for the first time. From that time on, he served in several leadership positions and was considered the city's intellectual and political leader.

According to Vadian, who understood his contemporaries well, "Ulrich was a very intelligent, observant, and eloquent man who enjoyed the trust of the citizenry to a high degree."

His reputation among the Confederates was also substantial. However, in the late 1480s, he became involved in a conflict that was to have serious negative consequences for him and for the city.

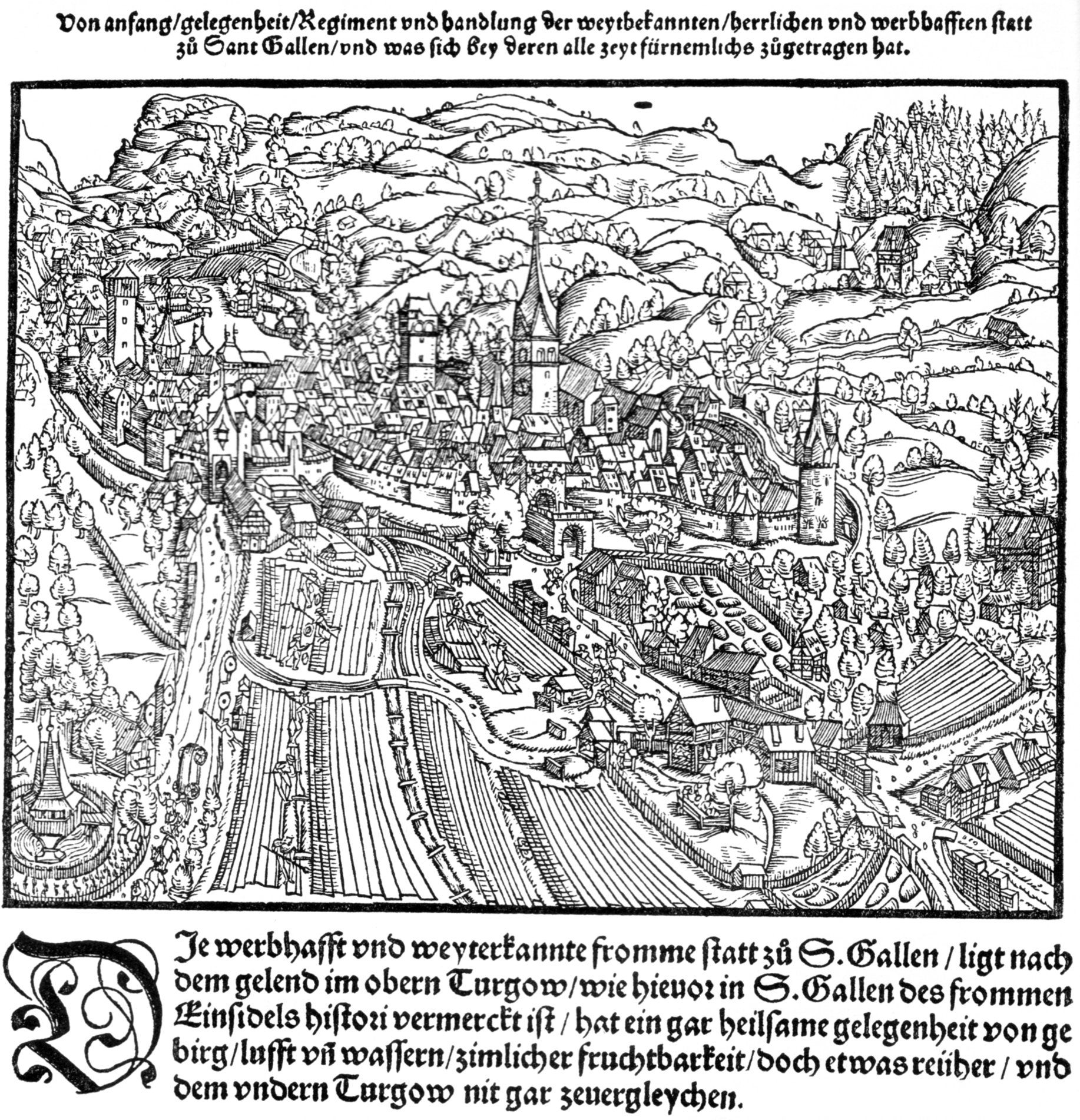
St. Gallen in 1548

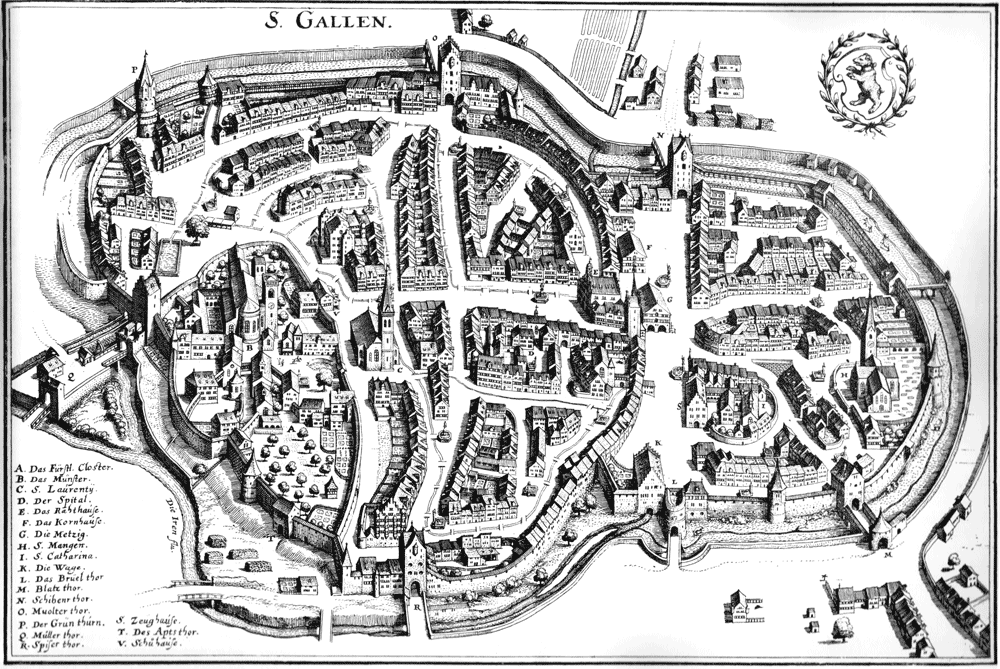
St. Gallen in 1642

In 1463, Ulrich Rösch had assumed the management of the abbey of Saint Gall. He was an ambitious prelate, whose goal was to return the abbey to prominence by every possible means, following the losses of the Appenzell War.

His restless ambition offended the political and material interests of his neighbours. When he arranged for the help of the Pope and the Emperor to carry out a plan to move the abbey to Rorschach on Lake Constance, he encountered stiff resistance from the St. Gallen citizenry, other clerics, and the Appenzell nobility in the Rhine Valley, who were concerned for their holdings.

At this point, Varnbüler entered the conflict against the prelate. He wanted to restrain the increase of the abbey's power and at the same time increase the power of the town that had been restricted in its development. For this purpose he established contact with farmers and Appenzell residents (led by the fanatical Hermann Schwendiner) who were seeking an opportunity to weaken the abbot.

Initially, he protested to the abbot and the representatives of the four sponsoring Confederate cantons (Zürich, Lucerne, Schwyz, and Glarus) against the construction of the new abbey in Rorschach. Then on 28 July 1489 he had armed troops from St. Gallen and Appenzell destroy the buildings already under construction, an attack known as the Rorschacher Klosterbruch.

When the Abbot complained to the Confederates about the damage and demanded full compensation, Ulrich responded with a countersuit, and in cooperation with Schwendiner rejected the arbitration efforts of the non-partisan Confederates. He motivated the clerics from Wil to Rorschach to abandon their loyalty to the abbey and spoke against the abbey at a meeting of the townspeople at Waldkirch, where the popular league was formed. He was confident that the four sponsoring cantons would not intervene with force, due to the prevailing tensions between the Confederation and the Swabian League. He was strengthened in his resolve when the people of St. Gallen re-elected him as their highest magistrate in 1490.

=== Invasion of 1490 ===
Ulrich Varnbüler had made a serious miscalculation. In early 1490, the four cantons decided to carry out their duty to the abbey and to invade the St. Gallen canton with an armed force. The people of Appenzell and the local clerics submitted to this force without significant resistance, while the city of St. Gallen braced itself for a fight to the finish. However, when they learned that their compatriots had given up the fight, they lost confidence, and they agreed to a settlement that greatly restricted the city's power and burdened the city with serious penalties and reparation payments.

Ulrich, overwhelmed by the responsibility for his political decisions, panicked in the face of the approaching enemy who wanted him apprehended. His life was in great danger, and he was forced to escape from the city disguised as a messenger. He made his way to Lindau and to Innsbruck and the court of King Maximilian. The victors confiscated those of his properties that lay outside of the city of St. Gallen and banned him from the Confederation. Ulrich then appealed to the imperial court (as did Schwendiner, who had fled with him) for the return of his property.

The suit had the support of Friedrich III and Maximilian and the trial threatened to drag on for years: it was continued by Ulrich's sons Hans and Ulrich after his death in 1496, and eventually the Varnbülers regained their properties. However, other political ramifications resulted from the court action, because the Confederation gained ownership of the city of St. Gallen and rejected the inroads of the empire. Thus, the conflict strengthened the relationship between the Confederation and the city of St. Gallen. On the other hand, the matter deepened the alienation between Switzerland and the German Holy Roman Empire, which eventually led to a total separation after the Swabian War.

Despite the unpropitious end of his career, Ulrich Varnbüler is immortalized in a famous woodcut by Albrecht Dürer, which is now held in the collection of the National Gallery of Art, Washington, DC, among other museums.

Among Varnbüler's sons, the eldest (Hans/Johann) became the mayor of Lindau. He is the patriarch of the Baden and Württemberg Varnbülers.

=== Reformation ===
Starting in 1526, then-mayor and humanist Joachim von Watt (Vadian) introduced the Protestant Reformation into St. Gallen. The town converted to the new religion while the abbey remained Roman Catholic. While iconoclastic riots forced the monks to flee the city and remove images from the city's churches, the fortified abbey remained untouched. The abbey would remain a Catholic stronghold in the Protestant city until 1803.

=== Modern history ===
In 1798 the French invaded Switzerland, destroying the Ancien Régime. Under the Helvetic Republic both the abbey and the city lost their power and were combined with Appenzell into the Canton of Säntis. The Helvetic Republic was widely unpopular in Switzerland and was overthrown in 1803. Following the Act of Mediation the city of St. Gallen became the capital of the Protestant Canton of St. Gallen.

One of the first acts of the new canton was to suppress the abbey. The monks were driven from the abbey; the last abbot died in Muri in 1829. In 1846 a rearrangement in the local dioceses made St. Gall a separate diocese, with the abbey church as its cathedral and a portion of the monastic buildings designated the bishop's residence.

Gustav Adolf IV, former king of Sweden, spent the last years of his life in St. Gallen, and died at the Zum Weissen Rössli inn in 1837.

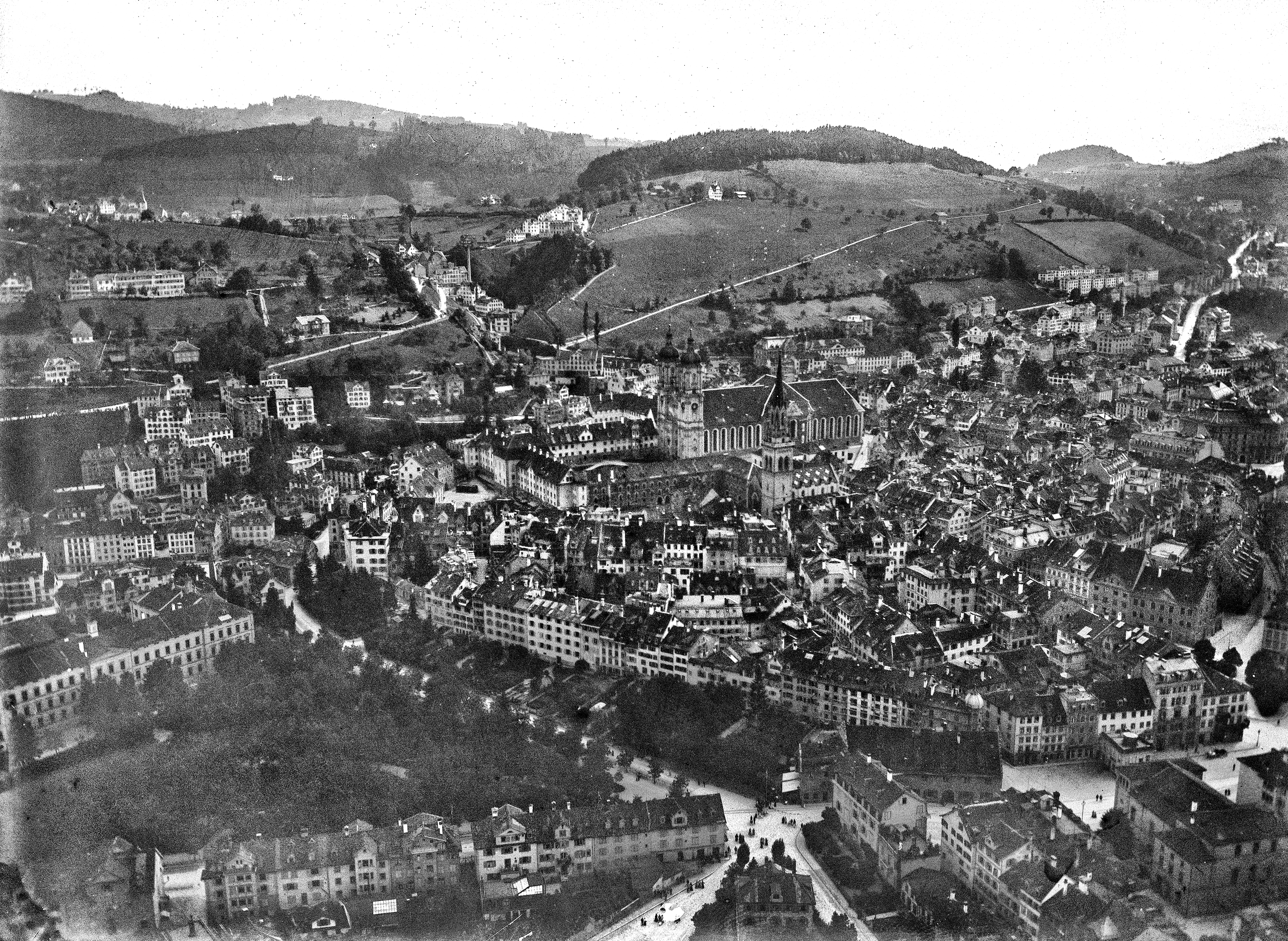
A view of St. Gallen ca. 1900 by Spelterini

Aerial view by Walter Mittelholzer (1919)

In the 15th century, St. Gallen became known for producing quality textiles. In 1714, the zenith was reached with a yearly production of 38,000 pieces of cloth. The first depression occurred in the middle of the 18th century, caused by strong foreign competition and reforms in methods of cotton production. But St. Gallen recovered and an even more prosperous era arrived.

At the beginning of the 19th century, the first embroidery machines were developed in St. Gallen. In 1910 the embroidery production constituted the largest export branch (18% of the total export value) in Switzerland and more than half of the worldwide production of embroidery originated in St. Gallen. One fifth of the population of the eastern part of Switzerland was involved with the textile industry. However, World War I and the Great Depression caused another severe crisis for St. Gallen embroidery. Only in the 1950s did the textile industry recover somewhat. Nowadays, because of competition and the prevalence of computer-operated embroidery machines, only a reduced textile industry has survived in St. Gallen; but its embroidered textiles are still popular with Parisian haute couture designers.

== Geography and climate ==
=== Topography ===
St. Gallen is situated in the northeastern part of Switzerland in a valley about 700 meters (2,300 ft) above sea level. It is one of the highest cities in Switzerland and thus receives abundant winter snow. The city lies between Lake Constance and the mountains of the Appenzell Alps (with the Säntis as the highest peak at 2,502 meters (8,209 ft)). It therefore offers excellent recreation areas nearby.

As the city center is built on an unstable turf ground (its founder Gallus was looking for a site for a hermitage, not for a city), all buildings on the valley floor must be built on piles. For example, the entire foundation of the train station and its plaza are based on hundreds of piles.

St. Gallen has an area, as of 2017, of 39.38 km^{2} (15.20 sq mi). Of this area, 27.7% is used for agricultural purposes, while 28.2% is forested. Of the rest of the land, 42.1% is settled (buildings or roads) and the remainder (1.9%) is non-productive (rivers or lakes).

=== Climate ===
St. Gallen has a humid continental climate (Dfb) with short, warm summers and long, moderately cold winters. Precipitation is very high year round. St. Gallen has a very cloudy climate.

Between 1981 and 2010 St. Gallen had an average of 141 days of rain or snow per year and on average received 1,248 mm (49.1 in) of precipitation. The wettest month was July during which time St. Gallen received an average of 172 mm (6.8 in) of rain. During this month there was precipitation for an average of 13.8 days. The months with the most days of precipitation were May, June and July. The driest month of the year was February with an average of 57 mm (2.2 in) of precipitation over 9.1 days.

Climate data for St. Gallen, elevation 776 m (2,546 ft), (1991–2020)
Month	Jan	Feb	Mar	Apr	May	Jun	Jul	Aug	Sep	Oct	Nov	Dec	Year
Mean daily maximum °C (°F)	2.9 (37.2)	3.8 (38.8)	7.9 (46.2)	12.2 (54.0)	16.5 (61.7)	19.9 (67.8)	21.7 (71.1)	21.3 (70.3)	16.8 (62.2)	12.4 (54.3)	7.0 (44.6)	3.9 (39.0)	12.2 (54.0)
Daily mean °C (°F)	0.2 (32.4)	0.8 (33.4)	4.4 (39.9)	8.1 (46.6)	12.2 (54.0)	15.7 (60.3)	17.5 (63.5)	17.2 (63.0)	13.1 (55.6)	9.2 (48.6)	4.3 (39.7)	1.3 (34.3)	8.7 (47.7)
Mean daily minimum °C (°F)	−2.3 (27.9)	−2.0 (28.4)	1.0 (33.8)	4.2 (39.6)	8.2 (46.8)	11.8 (53.2)	13.6 (56.5)	13.6 (56.5)	9.9 (49.8)	6.3 (43.3)	1.6 (34.9)	−1.6 (29.1)	5.4 (41.7)
Average precipitation mm (inches)	66.8 (2.63)	64.2 (2.53)	87.3 (3.44)	102.9 (4.05)	156.5 (6.16)	170.2 (6.70)	174.4 (6.87)	185.3 (7.30)	137.8 (5.43)	104.8 (4.13)	92.7 (3.65)	90.4 (3.56)	1,433.3 (56.43)
Average snowfall cm (inches)	33.4 (13.1)	44.8 (17.6)	27.0 (10.6)	10.1 (4.0)	1.0 (0.4)	0.0 (0.0)	0.0 (0.0)	0.0 (0.0)	0.1 (0.0)	2.5 (1.0)	20.6 (8.1)	37.5 (14.8)	177.0 (69.7)
Average precipitation days (≥ 1.0 mm)	10.6	9.4	12.0	11.3	13.5	13.8	13.4	12.8	11.6	10.5	10.5	11.6	141.0
Average snowy days (≥ 1.0 cm)	6.3	6.4	4.8	1.7	0.2	0.0	0.0	0.0	0.0	0.4	3.5	6.0	29.3
Average relative humidity (%)	80	76	72	68	71	72	71	74	79	81	82	80	76
Mean monthly sunshine hours	56.7	79.4	131.8	167.5	185.5	200.0	226.7	209.4	153.9	101.3	58.8	47.5	1,618.5
Percentage possible sunshine	27	32	38	43	42	44	50	50	44	34	26	25	40
Source 1: NOAA
Source 2: MeteoSwiss

=== Radioactivity ===
St. Gallen is notable for reporting the highest maximum radioactivity measurements of any Swiss city, as published in the 2009 yearly report by the Federal Office of Public Health. While the daily average level of gamma-ray radioactivity in the city is unremarkable at 105 nSv/h, the maximum can reach 195 nSv/h, as high as the average for Jungfraujoch, the location with the highest reported level of radioactivity in Switzerland, due to its high elevation and therefore greater exposure to cosmic rays. The same report explains that the unusually high spikes of radioactivity measured in St. Gallen are due to radioactive products of radon gas being washed to the ground during heavy storms, but does not explain where the sufficient quantities of radon gas and its products to account for the anomaly would come from. The yearly report for 2009 on risks associated with radon published by the same governmental agency shows St. Gallen to lie in an area of the lowest level of radon exposure. In addition to the measured gamma-radiation, the city may be subject to radioactive tritium pollution in Teufen, a satellite town situated 4 km south of the city in the canton of Appenzell Outer Rhodes (this pollution is also covered in the report).

== Politics ==
=== Coat of arms ===
The blazon of the municipal coat of arms is Argent a Bear rampant Sable langued and in his virility Gules and armed and gorged Or.

=== Government ===
The City Council (Stadtrat) constitutes the executive government of the City of St. Gallen and operates as a collegiate authority. It is composed of five councilors (German: Stadtrat/ Stadträtin), each presiding over a directorate. The president of the presidential directorate acts as mayor (Stadtpräsident). In the mandate period 2017–2020 (Legislatur) the City Council is presided by Stadtpräsidentin Maria Pappa. Departmental tasks, coordination measures and implementation of laws decreed by the City Parliament are carried by the City Council. The regular election of the City Council by any inhabitant valid to vote is held every four years. Any resident of St. Gallen allowed to vote can be elected as a member of the City Council. The current mandate period is from 1 January 2021 to 31 December 2024. The mayor is elected as such by public election by means of a system of Majorz, while the heads of the other directorates are assigned by the collegiate. The delegates are elected by means of a system of Majorz.

As of 2017, St. Gallen's City Council is made up of two representatives of the SP (Social Democratic Party) of which one is the mayor, one member of the FDP (FDP.The Liberals), one of the GLP (Green Liberal Party), and one independent. The last regular election was held on 27 September 2020.

Stadtrat of St. Gallen
City Councillor (Stadtrat/ Stadträtin)	Party	Head of Directorate (Direktion, since) of	elected since
Maria Pappa (Note: Mayor (Stadtpräsidentin))	SP	Home Secretary and Finances (Direktion Inneres und Finanzen, 2021)	2016
Dr. Sonja Lüthi (Note: Vice-Mayor (Vize-Stadtpräsident))	glp	Social Services and Security (Direktion Soziales und Sicherheit, 2017)	Nov 2017
Markus Buschor	independent	Civil Engineering and Construction and Planning (Direktion Bau und Planung, 2021)	2012
Peter Jans	SP	Industrial Facilities (Direktion Technische Betriebe, 2015)	2014
Mathis Gabathuler	FDP	Education and Spare Time (Direktion Bildung und Freizeit, 2021)	2020

Manfred Linke is City Chancellor (Stadtschreiber) since for the City Chancellary.

=== Parliament ===
The Stadtparlament of St. Gallen for the mandate period of 2021-2024
1. JUSO (1.60%)
2. JungeGr (1.60%)
3. SP (27.0%)
4. GPS (11.1%)
5. PFG (1.60%)
6. glp (12.7%)
7. EVP (1.60%)
8. CVP (12.7%)
9. FDP (17.5%)
10. SVP (12.7%)

The City Parliament (Stadtparlament) holds legislative power. It is made up of 63 members, with elections held every four years. The City Parliament decrees regulations and by-laws that are executed by the City Council and the administration. The delegates are selected by means of a system of proportional representation.

The sessions of the City Parliament are public. Unlike members of the City Council, members of the City Parliament are not politicians by profession, and they are paid a fee based on their attendance. Any resident of St. Gallen allowed to vote can be elected as a member of the City Parliament. The parliament holds its meetings in the Waaghaus once a week on Tuesdays.

The last regular election of the City Parliament was held on 27 September 2020 for the mandate period (German: Legislatur) from January 2021 to December 2024. Currently the City Parliament consists of 17 members of the Social Democratic Party (SP/PS) and one of its junior section, the JUSO, 11 The Liberals (FDP/PLR), 8 Green Liberal Party (GLP/PVL), 8 Christian Democratic People's Party (CVP/PDC), 8 Swiss People's Party (SVP/UDC), 7 Green Party (GPS/PES) and 1 of its junior section, the JungeGr, one representative of the Evangelical People's Party (EVP), and one member of the Politische Frauengruppe (PFG) (Political Women Group).

=== National elections ===
==== National Council ====
In the 2019 federal election for the Swiss National Council the most popular party was the PS which received 24.4% (-3.8) of the vote. The next five most popular parties were the Green Party (17.5%, +8.3), the SVP (16.5%, -4.6), FDP (14.4%, +0.1), the CVP (12.6%, +0.4), and the GLP (10.9%, +4.4). In the federal election a total of 18,821 votes were cast, and the voter turnout was 42.9%.

In the 2015 election for the Swiss National Council the most popular party was the SPS which received 28.1% of the vote. The next five most popular parties were the SVP (21.1%), the FDP (14.3%), the CVP (12.2%), the GPS (9.2%), and the GLP (6.6%). In the federal election, a total of 20,768 voters were cast, and the voter turnout was 46.0%.

== International relations ==
St. Gallen is twinned with:

- Liberec, Czech Republic

== Demographics ==
=== Population ===
Largest groups of foreign residents (2019)
Nationality	Numbers
Germany	4,979
Italy	2,713
Kosovo	1,935
Serbia	1,339
Portugal	1,163
Austria	1,144
Bosnia and Herzegovina	995
North Macedonia	894
Turkey	725
Spain	707

St. Gallen has a population (as of 31 December 2020) of 76,213. As of 2019, about 31.4% of the population was made up of foreign nationals. The population has grown at 4.4% per year. Most of the population (as of 2000) speaks German (83.0%), with Italian being second most common (3.7%) and Serbo-Croatian being third (3.7%). Of the Swiss national languages (as of 2000), 60,297 speak German, 575 people speak French, 2,722 people speak Italian, and 147 people speak Romansh.

The age distribution, as of 2000, in St. Gallen is: 6,742 (9.3%) between 0 and 9 years old; 7,595 (10.5%) between 10 and 19; 12,574 (17.3%) between 20 and 29; 11,735 (16.2%) between 30 and 39; 9,535 (13.1%) between 40 and 49; 8,432 (11.6%) between 50 and 59; 6,461 (8.9%) between 60 and 69; 5,633 (7.8%) between 70 and 79; 3,255 (4.5%) between 80 and 89; 655 (0.9%) between 90 and 99; 9 people (0.0%) aged 100 or more.

In 2000 there were 16,166 people (22.3%) who were living alone in private dwellings; 17,137 (or 23.6%) who were part of a couple (married or otherwise committed) without children, and 27,937 (or 38.5%) who were part of a couple with children. There were 4,533 (or 6.2%) people who lived in single parent home, while there are 419 persons who were adult children living with one or both parents, 475 persons who lived in a household made up of relatives, 2,296 who lived household made up of unrelated persons, and 3,663 who are either institutionalized or live in another type of collective housing.

=== Historical population ===
The historical population is given in the following table:

year	population	Swiss Nationals	% German Speaking	% Italian Speaking	% Romansh Speaking	% Protestant	% Roman Catholic
1411	ca. 2,300–2,900						
about 1500	ca. 3,000–4,000						
1680	ca. 6,000						
1766	ca. 8,350						
1809	8,118						
1837	9,430						
1850	17,858	16,529				50.4%	49.3%
1870b	26,398	23,805				49.8%	49.9%
1888	43,296	34,168	97.5%	1.4%	0.5%	49.0%	49.7%
1900	53,796	40,342	94.9%	3.6%	0.7%	46.8%	52.1%
1910	75,482	50,582	88.7%	9.5%	0.8%	43.5%	54.2%
1930	63,947	52,679	95.9%	2.5%	0.8%	48.5%	49.0%
1950	68,011	61,009	95.4%	2.6%	1.0%	49.3%	47.8%
1970	80,852	66,270	86.3%	8.6%	0.8%	42.1%	55.1%
1990	75,237	58,300	82.4%	5.6%	1.1%	35.1%	50.8%
2000	72,626	53,132	83.0%	3.7%	0.8%	28.9%	44.0%

=== Economy ===
As of 2026, St. Gallen had an unemployment rate of 1.9%. As of 2005, there were 336 people employed in the primary economic sector and about 95 businesses involved in this sector. 11,227 people are employed in the secondary sector and there are 707 businesses in this sector. 48,729 people are employed in the tertiary sector, with 4,035 businesses in this sector. As of October 2009 the average unemployment rate was 4.5%. There were 4857 businesses in the municipality of which 689 were involved in the secondary sector of the economy while 4102 were involved in the third. As of 2000 there were 28,399 residents who worked in the municipality, while 8,927 residents worked outside St. Gallen and 31,543 people commuted into the municipality for work.

Helvetia Insurance is a major company headquartered in St. Gallen.

=== Religion ===
According to the 2000 census, 31,978 or 44.0% are Roman Catholic, while 19,578 or 27.0% belonged to the Swiss Reformed Church. Of the rest of the population, there are 112 individuals (or about 0.15% of the population) who belong to the Christian Catholic faith, there are 3,253 individuals (or about 4.48% of the population) who belong to the Orthodox Church, and there are 1,502 individuals (or about 2.07% of the population) who belong to another Christian church. There are 133 individuals (or about 0.18% of the population) who are Jewish, and 4,856 (or about 6.69% of the population) who are Muslim. There are 837 individuals (or about 1.15% of the population) who belong to another church (not listed on the census), 7,221 (or about 9.94% of the population) belong to no church, are agnostic or atheist, and 3,156 individuals (or about 4.35% of the population) did not answer the question.

== Education ==
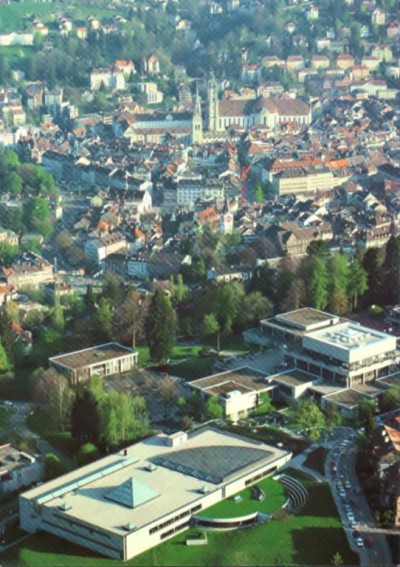
HSG campus with the Abbey in the background

St. Gallen is known for its business school, now named the University of St. Gallen (HSG). It was ranked as the top business school in Europe by Wirtschaftswoche, a weekly German business news magazine and is highly ranked by several other sources. Recently, HSG has been building a reputation for Executive Education, with its International MBA recognised as one of Europe's leading programmes, and runs a PhD programme. HSG is a focused university that offers degrees in business and management, economics, political science and international relations as well as business law. The Master in Management course was Ranked number 1 in 2014 by The Financial Times ahead of HEC Paris. It is comparatively small, with about 6,500 students enrolled at present, has EQUIS, AMBA and AACSB accreditations, and is a member of CEMS (Community of European Management Schools) and APSIA (Association of Professional Schools of International Affairs). The university maintains student and faculty exchange programs around the world. The University of St. Gallen is also famous for its high density of clubs. Particularly well known is the International Students' Committee, which has organised the St. Gallen Symposium for over forty years. The St. Gallen Symposium is the leading student-run economic conference of its kind worldwide and aims to foster the dialogue between generations.

St. Gallen's state school system contains 64 kindergartens, 21 primary schools and 7 secondary schools and about 6,800 students. In addition to the state system, St. Gallen is home to the Institut auf dem Rosenberg — an élite boarding school attracting students from all over the world. The Institut provides an education in English and German and prepares the students to enter: American, British, Swiss, Italian, German and other European university programmes.

The canton's Gewerbliches Berufs- und Weiterbildungszentrum is the largest occupational school in Switzerland with over 10,000 students and various specialty institutes. One for example, the GBS Schule für Gestaltung teaches students design fundamentals in the practice of graphic design. The school is located in Riethüsli, a small section of the city of St. Gallen.

In St. Gallen about 68.8% of the population (between age 25–64) have completed either non-mandatory upper secondary education or additional higher education (either university or a Fachhochschule). Out of the total population in St. Gallen, as of 2000, the highest education level completed by 15,035 people (20.7% of the population) was Primary, while 27,465 (37.8%) have completed their secondary education, 10,249 (14.1%) have attended a Tertiary school, and 2,910 (4.0%) are not in school. The remainder did not answer this question.

== Culture and sightseeing ==
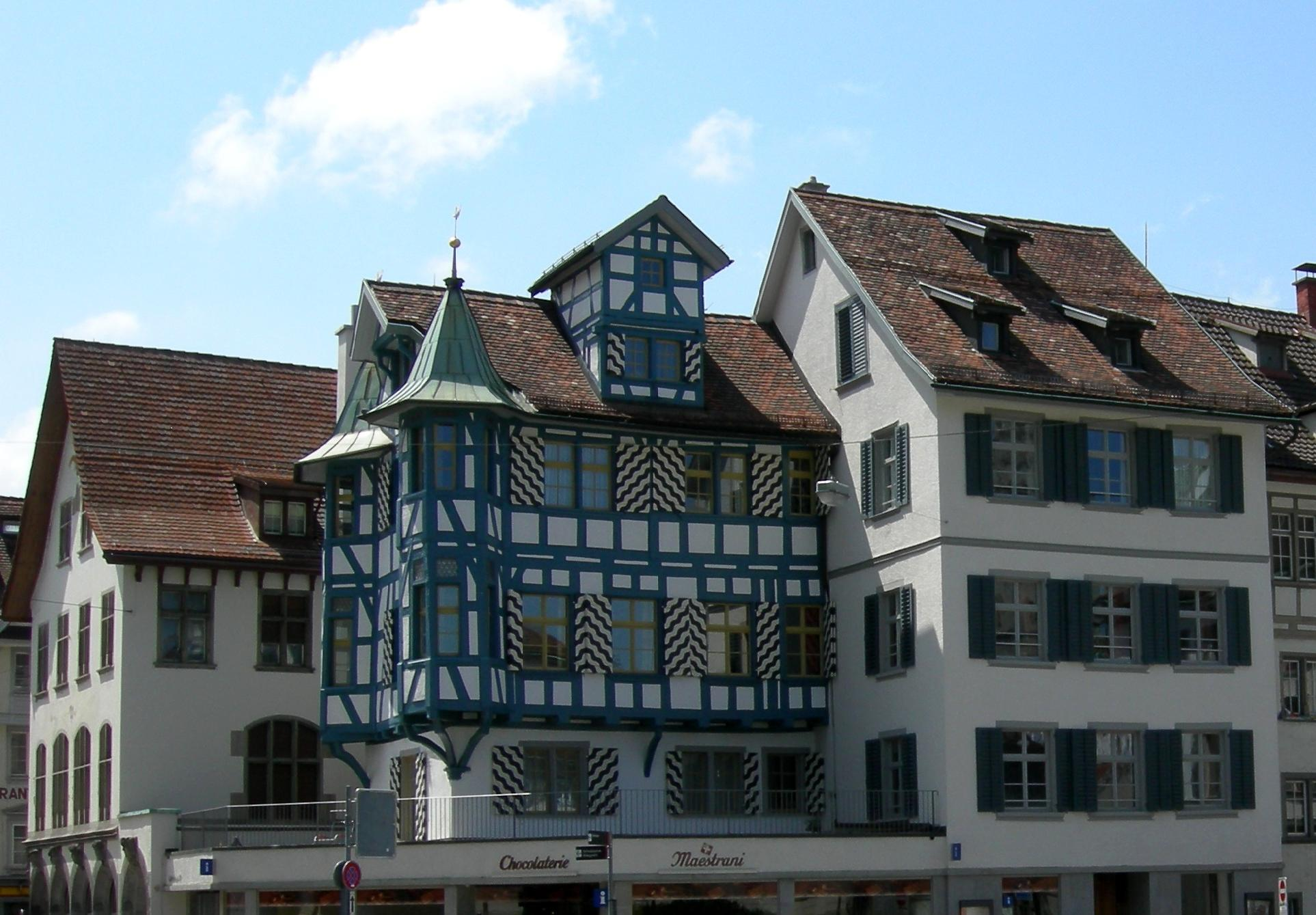
Old houses of St. Gallen

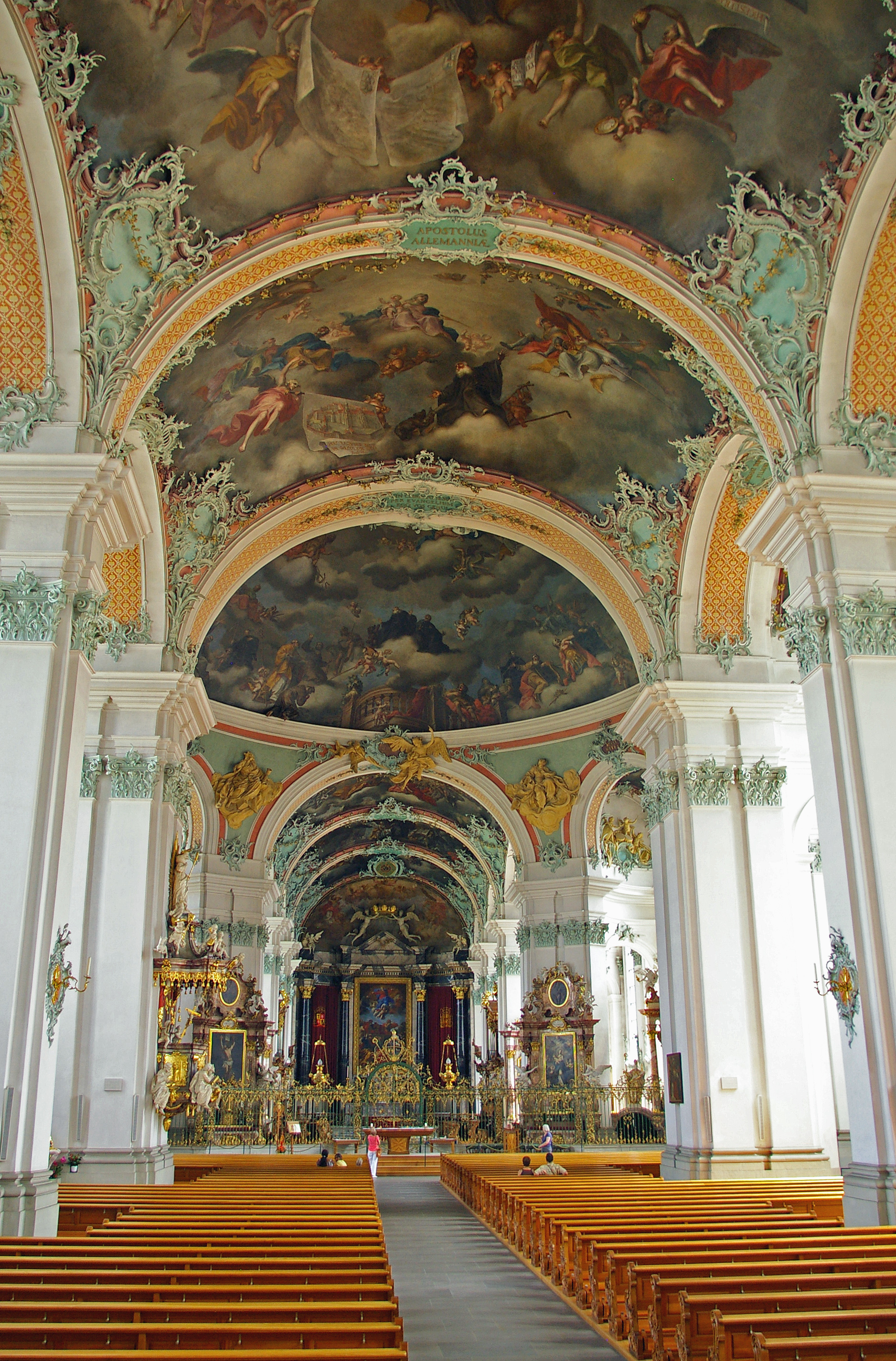
The interior of the Cathedral is one of the most important baroque monuments in Switzerland

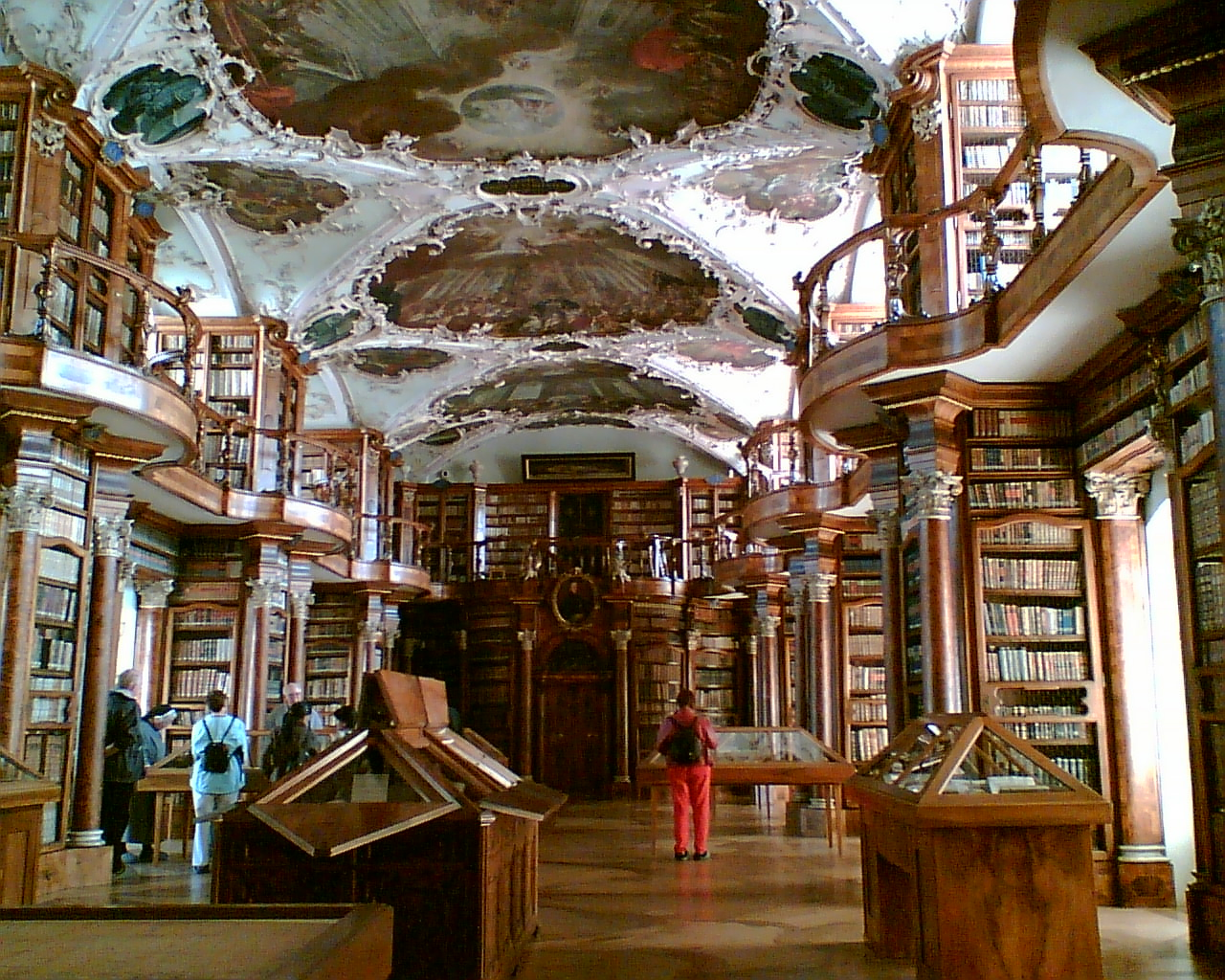
Library of St. Gallen

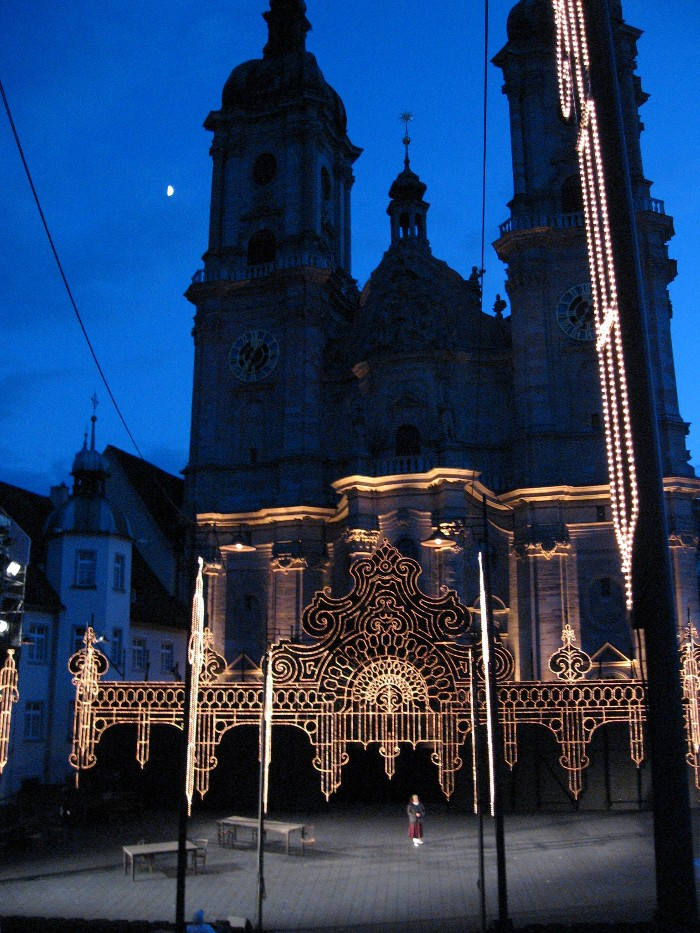
An opera rehearsal in front of St. Gallen Cathedral, 2007

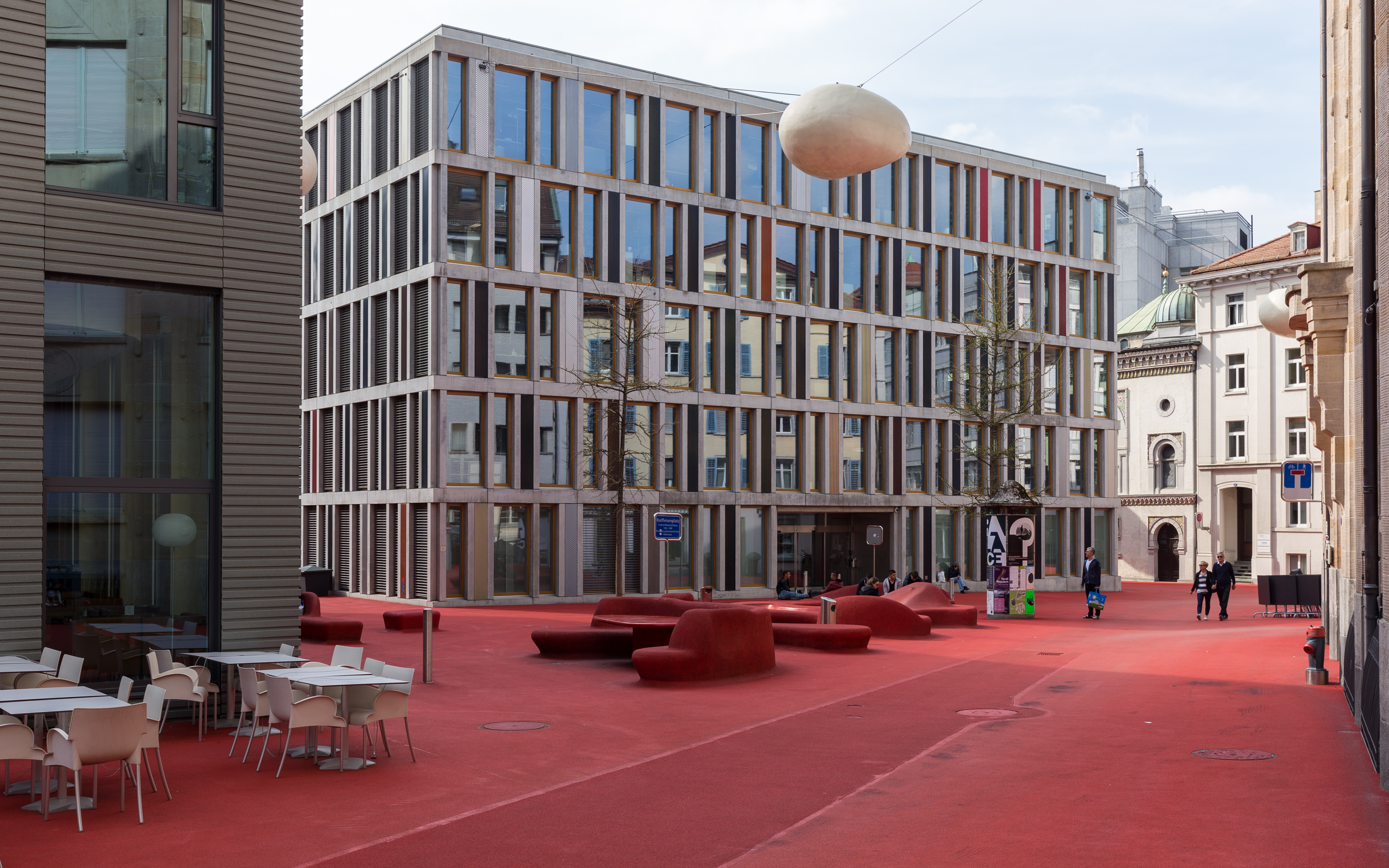
Citylounge ("Stadtlounge") at Raiffeisen square

In the years after Gallus' death, St. Gallen became one of the centers of Germanic culture due to the creative works of the monks who followed the footsteps of the city's founder Gallus. This resulted in numerous heritage sites of national significance.

In 1992, St. Gallen was awarded the Wakker Prize for the city's effort to create a unified structure and appearance in current and future construction.

=== Heritage sites of national significance ===
There are 28 sites in St. Gallen that are listed as Swiss heritage sites of national significance, including four religious buildings; the Abbey of St. Gallen, the former Dominican Abbey of St. Katharina, the Reformed Church of St. Laurenzenkirche and the Roman Catholic parish church of St. Maria Neudorf.

There are six museums or archives in the inventory. This includes the Textile museum, the Historical and ethnographical museum, the Cantonal library and city archives, the Art and Natural History museum, the Museum in Lagerhaus and the St. Gallen State Archive. The entire city of St. Gallen is the only archaeological heritage site. Two bridges are listed, the Eisenbahnbrücke BT (railroad bridge) and the Kräzern-Strassenbrücke with a custom house.

The twelve other sites include the main train station, main post office, University of St. Gallen, Cantonal School, City Theatre and two towers; the Lokremise with Wasserturm and the Tröckneturm.

=== Theatre ===
- In the modern and somewhat extravagant building of the Theater St. Gallen operas, operettas, ballet, musicals and plays are performed. It has an average utilization of nearly 80 percent.
- Since 2006 a series of open-air operas have been performed in front of the Cathedral starting around the last weekend of June.
- In the nearby concert hall, Tonhalle St. Gallen, with its grand Art Nouveau style, all sorts of concerts (classic, symphony, jazz etc.) are given.

=== Museums ===
- Historical and ethnographical museum (collections of regional early history, city history, folk art, cultural history as well ethnographical collections from all over the world)
- Art museum (painting and sculptures from the 19th and 20th century)
- St. Gallen art gallery (national and international modern art)
- Natural history museum (natural history collection)
- Museum in the storehouse (Swiss native art and art brut)
- Textile museum (historical laces, embroidery and cloth)
- Lapidarium of the abbey (building blocks from 8th to 17th century)
- Point Jaune museum (Mail Art, Postpostism, 'Pataphysics)
- Beer bottle museum (located at the Schützengarten brewery—the oldest brewery in Switzerland)

=== Music ===
- The symphony orchestra St. Gallen performs as the Orchestra of the City Theatre, presents numerous symphony concerts in the City Concert Hall.
- During the summer open-air opera and various concerts are performed at numerous locations in town.
- The well known St. Gallen Open Air Festival takes place in the nearby Sitter Valley the first weekend in July.
- St. Gallen is home to the Nordklang Festival, which takes place in February.

=== Buildings ===
- Drei Weieren (three artificial water basins from the zenith of the textile industry with Art Nouveau-bath houses; reachable by the Mühleggbahn (train) from 1893). The Drei Weieren is a water park by day and a gathering place for young people by night. This results in many complaints by people who live in the vicinity about noise, drug abuse and vandalism. Locals jokingly call the three basins "Lakes with the most THC in the country". The young people who spend their time there claim that the Drei Weieren is a place where they can spend their time in a consumer-free environment.
- Convent of St. Gall with the famous library and abbey (UNESCO World Heritage Site)
- Greek Orthodox Church of St.Constantine and Helena, Athonite icons and a stained glass window of the Last Judgement.
- Wegelin & Co., the oldest bank in Switzerland, founded in 1741
- Tröckneturm Schönenwegen; the tower was built 1828 and was used to hang up freshly colored cloth panels for drying.
- Protestant church Linsebühl, an impressive new Renaissance building dating from 1897
- University of St. Gallen (HSG; University for Business Administration, Economics and Law with an excellent reputation in the German-speaking world), founded 1898.
- Embroidery exchange, splendid building with the god of trade Hermes on its roof.
- Volksbad, the oldest public bathhouse still in operation in Switzerland dating from 1908.
- Catholic church of St. Martin in the Bruggen district; the concrete church built in 1936 was at that time glaringly modern.
- 1992 the city of St. Gallen received the Wakker Prize.
- Stadtlounge (City Lounge) – a pedestrian area in the city center designed to represent a lounge room, but in the street.
- Synagogue St. Gallen – Built by the architects Chiodera and Tschudy, it is the only synagogue in the Lake Constance region that has been preserved in its original state.
- The city has 111 oriels.

=== Parks ===
- Wildlife park Peter and Paul
- City park at the theater
- Cantonal school park

=== Regular events ===
- The St. Gallen Symposium attracts about 600 personalities from economics, science, politics and society to the University of St. Gallen every year. It hosts the world's largest student essay competition of its kind with about 1,000 participants, of whom the 100 best contributions are selected to participate in the St. Gallen Symposium. The Symposium celebrated its 40th anniversary in May 2010.
- OLMA, traditional Swiss Fair for Agriculture and Nutrition in autumn as well as numerous other exhibitions at the OLMA Fairs St. Gallen. The St. Galler Bratwurst is served there as a staple.
- OpenAir St. Gallen is an annual open air festival in the Sitter Valley.
- Children's Feast, a triennial observance, originally a product of the textile industry.
- Nordklang Festival takes place in multiple sites around St. Gallen.

== Sport ==
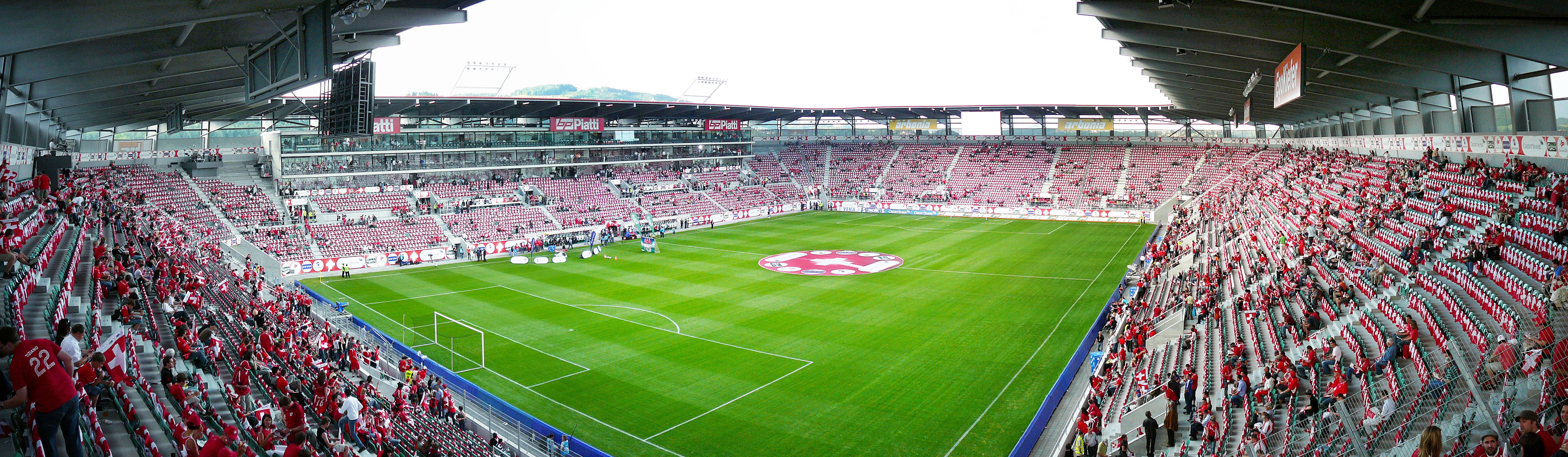
Kybunpark, home stadium of FC St. Gallen

- The football club FC St. Gallen play in the Swiss Super League. They are the oldest football club in Switzerland and oldest in continental Europe, founded in 1879. Their stadium is the kybunpark.
- The football club SC Brühl play in the Promotion League. Their stadium is the Paul-Grüninger-Stadion.
- EHC St. Gallen plays in the Swiss Second League, the fourth tier of Swiss ice hockey.
- The Rugby Club St. Gallen Bishops (Men) was founded in 1990 and Cindies (Women) in 2014. They play at the Grundenmoos sports fields.
- TSV St. Otmar St. Gallen play in the Swiss Handball League and has won multiple Swiss championships

== Transportation ==
The large urban area of Zurich is 80 km (50 mi) south-west of St. Gallen, a 60-minute drive or train ride (IC train).

=== Rail ===
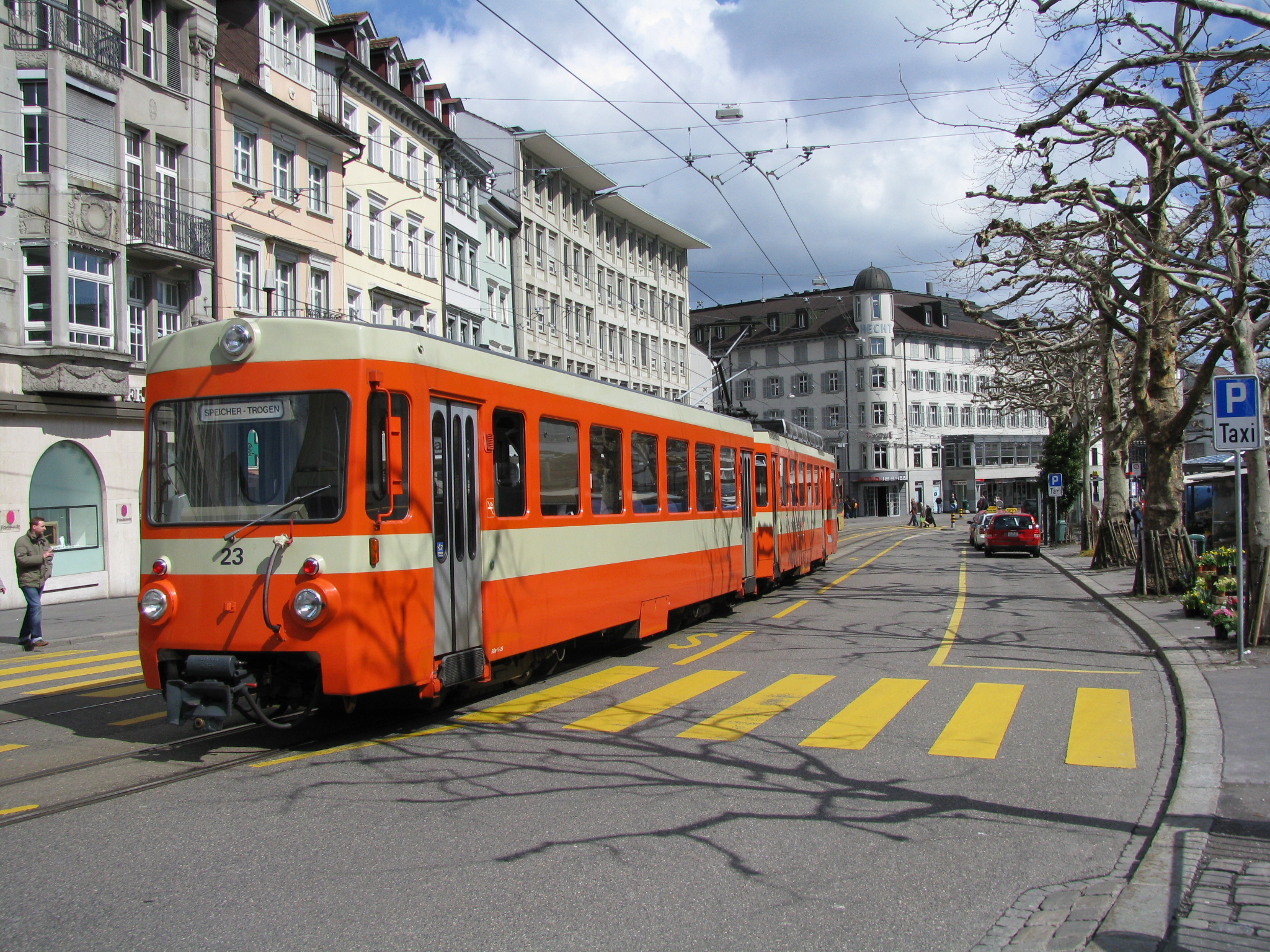
Trogen railway running tramway-like on St. Gallen roads

St. Gallen railway station, the city's main railway station, is part of the national Swiss Federal Railways (SBB CFF FFS) network and has InterCity (IC) connections to Zürich HB and Zurich Airport every half-hour, in addition to EuroCity (EC) trains to Zürich HB and München Hbf, via Bregenz, InterRegio (IR) trains to Zürich HB and Chur, and RegioExpress (RE) trains to Konstanz.

Apart from SBB and its subsidiary Thurbo, St. Gallen is also the hub for two private railway companies. The Südostbahn (SOB) connects, among others, St. Gallen with Rapperswil and Lucerne (Voralpen-Express, an InterRegio). The Appenzell Railways (AB), which operates the Appenzell–St. Gallen–Trogen railway, connects St. Gallen with Appenzell and Trogen, and also serves as a tram in downtown St. Gallen. St. Gallen has its own S-Bahn network, the St. Gallen S-Bahn, which partly overlaps with the trinational Bodensee S-Bahn around Lake Constance (Bodensee), connecting St. Gallen with municipalities in Eastern Switzerland and some destinations in Austria and Germany.

In total, there are 13 railway stations in the municipality of St. Gallen (fare zone 210 of the Ostwind tariff network), most of which are only served by regional S-Bahn trains only:

- Schwarzer Bären
- St. Gallen
- St. Gallen Birnbäumen
- St. Gallen Bruggen
- St. Gallen Güterbahnhof
- St. Gallen Haggen
- St. Gallen St. Fiden
- St. Gallen Marktplatz
- St. Gallen Notkersegg
- St. Gallen Riethüsli
- St. Gallen Schülerhaus
- St. Gallen Spisertor
- St. Gallen Winkeln

There is also a funicular, the Mühleggbahn, from St. Gallen to St. Georgen.

=== Bus ===
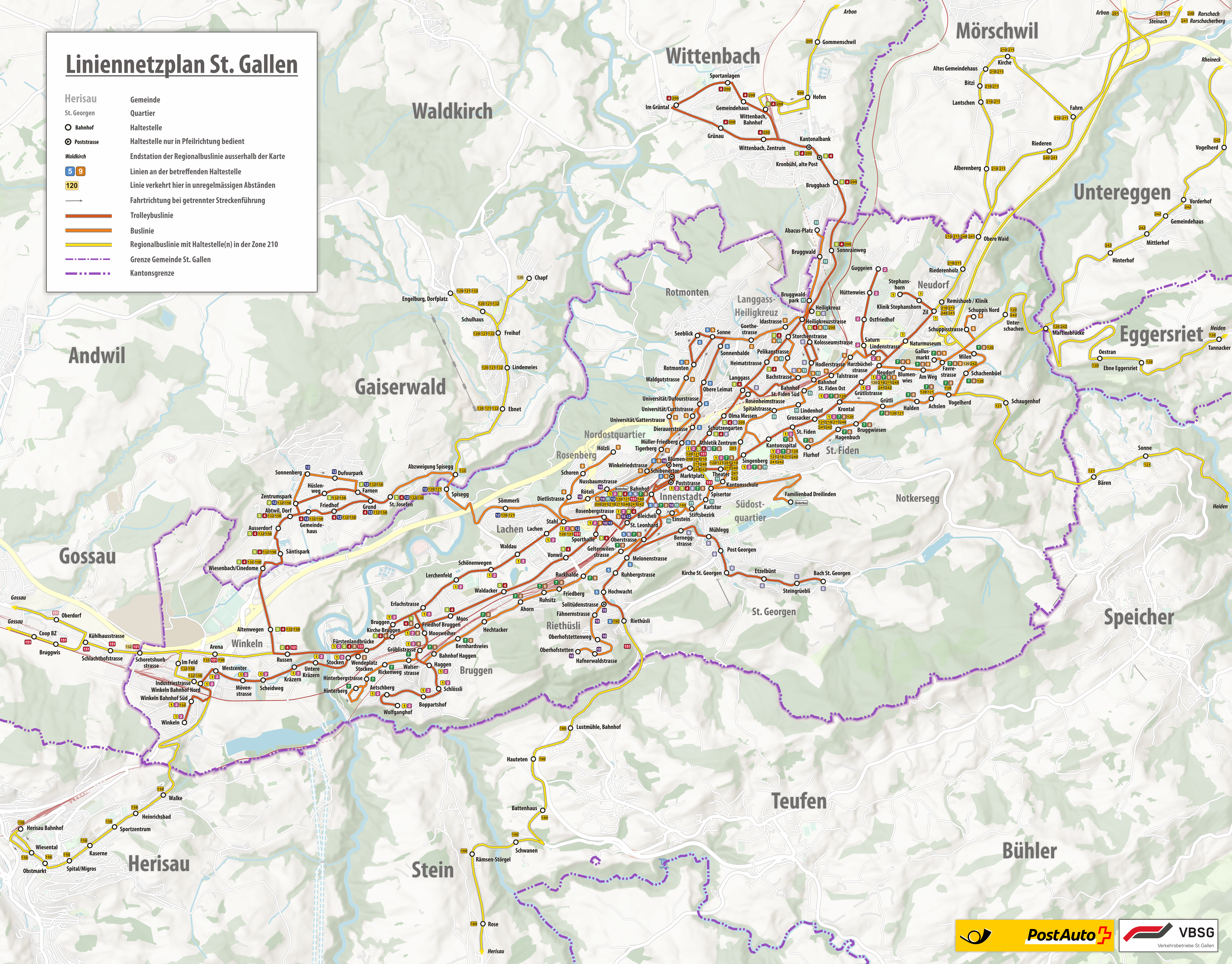
St. Gallen bus network (as of 2025)

The city has a dense local bus system, including the city's trolleybus network, which is operated by the Verkehrsbetriebe St. Gallen (VBSG) and is well established on the valley floor, but less so on the hills. As St. Gallen is located near the Appenzell mountain area, it offers also many PostAuto bus connections. Regiobus also serves stations in St. Gallen.

=== Road ===
The A1 motorway links St. Gallen with St. Margrethen, Zurich, Bern and Geneva. In 1987, the city motorway was opened, which conveys the traffic through two tunnels (Rosenberg and Stefanshorn) almost directly below the city center.

=== Air ===
The Airport St. Gallen-Altenrhein, near Lake of Constance, provides scheduled airline flights to Vienna and other destinations. Zurich Airport is also close which is located 85.4 km (53.1 mi) away west of St. Gallen.

== Notable people ==
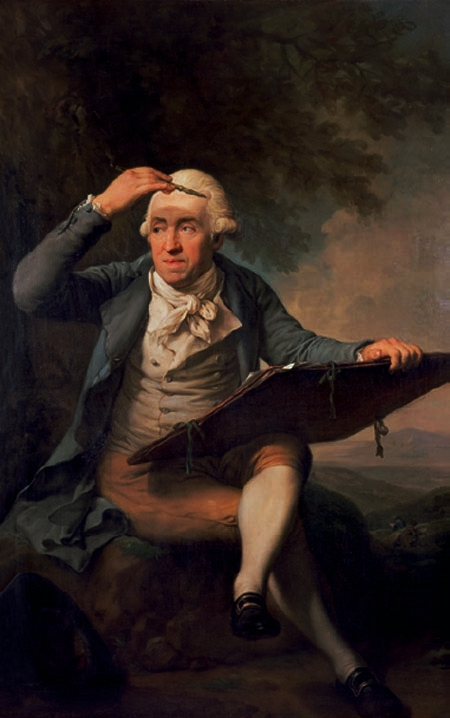
Portrait of Adrian Zingg, 1796

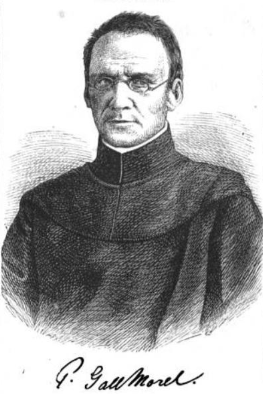
Gall Morel, 1872

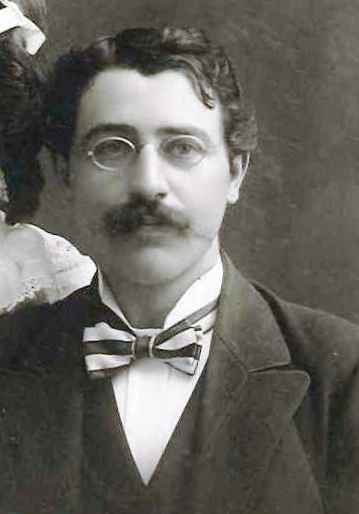
Julius Billeter, 1899

=== Early times ===
- Joachim Vadian (1484–1551), humanist, scholar, mayor and reformer in St. Gallen
- Johannes Zollikofer (1633–1692), reformed vicar
- Georg Gsell (1673–1740), Baroque painter, art consultant and art dealer
- Michael Schlatter (1716–1790), American German Reformed clergyman
- Rev. John Joachim Zubly (1724–1781), American pastor, planter and statesman during the American Revolution
- Adrian Zingg (1734–1816), painter, draftsman, etcher and engraver
- Christopher Girtanner FRSE (1760–1800), author, physician and chemist
- Johann Baptist Isenring (1796–1860), landscape painter, printer and Daguerrotypist

=== 19th century ===
- Gall Morel (1803–1872), poet, scholar, aesthete and educationist
- Arnold Otto Aepli (1816–1897), jurist and statesman, President of the Swiss Council of States 1868–1869
- Johann Jakob Weilenmann (1819–1896), mountaineer and Alpine writer
- Karl Hoffmann (1820–1895), politician, President of the Swiss Council of States, 1877–1878 and 1889–1890
- Ernst Götzinger (1837–1896), Germanist and historian
- Alphonse Bory (1838–1891), politician, President of the Swiss Council of States 1886–1887
- Johannes Dierauer (1842–1920), historian and librarian of the Stadtbibliothek Vadiana
- Samuel Oettli (1846–1911), Protestant theologian
- Adolf Schlatter (1852–1938), Protestant theologian and professor of the New Testament
- Arthur Hoffmann (1857–1927), politician and member of the Swiss Federal Council 1911–1917
- Robert Emden (1862–1940), astrophysicist and meteorologist
- Julius Billeter (1869–1957), genealogist and Mormon missionary
- Ernst Rüdin (1874–1952), German psychiatrist, geneticist, eugenicist and Nazi
- Martha Cunz (1876–1961), artist and printmaker, mastered the modernist woodcut
- Joseph Joos (1878–1965), German intellectual, politician and MP in Weimar, lived in St. Gallen 1960–1965
- Franz Riklin (1878–1938), psychiatrist
- Otto Schlaginhaufen (1879–1973), anthropologist, ethnologist and eugenicist
- Heinrich Greinacher (1880–1974), physicist
- Fritz Platten (1883–1942), Communist politician
- Regina Ullmann (1884–1961), poet and storyteller
- Paul Scherrer (1890–1969), physicist, proponent of Switzerland developing its own nuclear weapons
- Karl Kobelt (1891–1968), politician, President of the Confederation in 1946 and 1952
- Paul Grüninger (1891–1972), police captain, Righteous Among the Nations
- Charles Stoffel (1893–1970), bobsledder and equestrian
- Walter Mittelholzer (1894–1937), aviation pioneer, pilot, photographer and travel writer
- Ottó Misángyi (1895–1977), Hungarian athletics coach, sports official and university professor
- Thomas Holenstein (1896–1962), politician, member of the Swiss Federal Council 1955–1959

=== 20th century ===
- Jolanda Neff (born 1993), cross-country cyclist
- Berta Rahm (1910–1998), architect, writer, publisher and feminist activist
- Bärbel Inhelder (1913–1997), psychologist and epistemologist
- Peter Maag (1919–2001), conductor
- Walter Roderer (1920–2012), actor and screenwriter
- Paul Hans Tobler (1923-2023), metalworker
- Kurt Furgler (1924–2008), politician, member of the Swiss Federal Council 1972–1986
- Fred Iklé (1924–2011), sociologist and defense expert
- Fred Hayman (1925–2016), American fashion retailer and entrepreneur
- Hansrudi Wäscher (1928–2016), Swiss-German comics artist and comics author
- Peter Hildebrand Meienberg (1929–2021), Benedictine Missionary
- Ines Torelli (1931–2019), comedian, radio personality and actress
- Max Meier (born 1936), boxer
- Hugo Tschirky (1938–2020), scientist in the field of management science
- Hans Eugen Frischknecht (born 1939), composer and organist
- Niklaus Meienberg (1940–1993), writer and investigative journalist
- Ruth Dreifuss (born 1940), politician, member of the Swiss Federal Council 1993–2002
- Dieter Mobius (1944–2015), German electronic musician and composer
- Daniel Thürer (born 1945), jurist and law professor
- Karl Ammann (born 1948), conservationist and wildlife photographer
- Josef Flammer (born 1948), ophthalmologist
- Paola del Medico (born 1950), singer
- Christophe Boesch (1951–2024), primatologist
- Peter Liechti (1951–2014), movie director
- René Tinner (born 1953), recording engineer and producer
- Hans Fässler (born 1954), historian, politician and satirical revue artist
- Simone Drexel (born 1957), singer-songwriter
- Susan Boos (born 1963), journalist
- Michael Hengartner (born 1966), Swiss-Canadian biochemist and molecular biologist
- Prince Maximilian of Liechtenstein (born 1969), CEO of the LGT Group
- Monika Fischer (born 1971), photographer of portrait projects
- Maria Pappa (born 1971), politician
- Marco Zwyssig (born 1971), footballer
- Aurelia Frick (born 1975), Liechtensteiner politician
- David Philip Hefti (born 1975), composer and conductor
- Dominik Meichtry (born 1984), swimmer
- Tranquillo Barnetta (born 1985), footballer
- Nevin Galmarini (born 1986), snowboarder, Olympic winner
- Linda Fäh (born 1987), model and beauty pageant titleholder, Miss Switzerland 2009
- Marwin Hitz (born 1987), professional football player
- Kevin Fiala (born 1996), ice hockey player

== See also ==
- List of mayors of St. Gallen
- Tourism in Switzerland
