= Samuel Oettli =

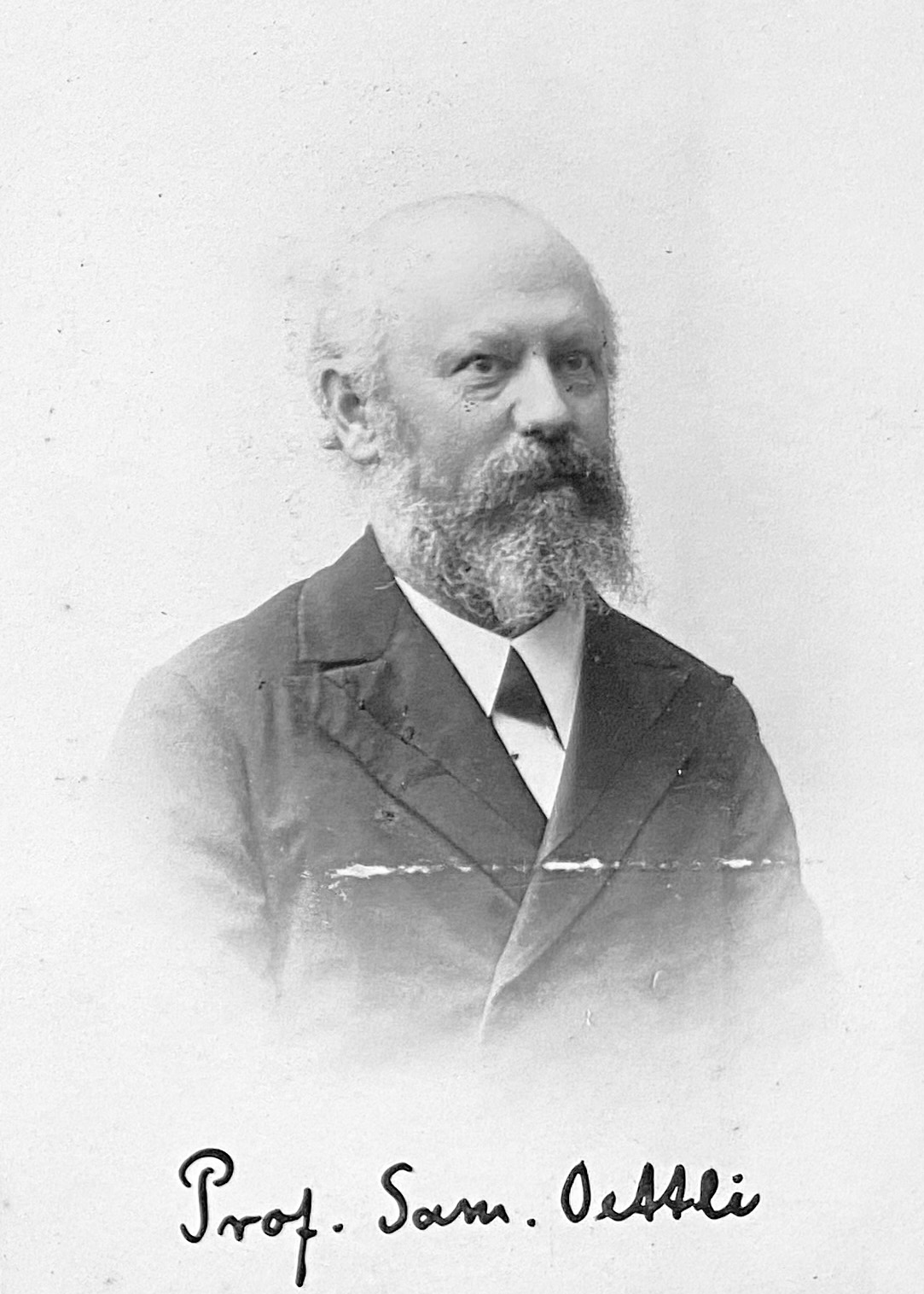
Samuel Oettli (1896)

Samuel Oettli (29 July 1846, in St. Gallen – 23 September 1911, in Illenau near Achern) was a Swiss Protestant theologian, who specialized in Old Testament studies.

He studied theology at the universities Basel, Zürich and Göttingen, and later served as a pastor in the communities of Roggwil (from 1872) and Wangen. In 1878 he became an associate professor of Old Testament studies at the University of Bern, where two years later he gained a full professorship. Due to serious illness, Adolf Schlatter took over his lectures at the university during the winter semester of 1880/81. From 1895 onward, he was a professor at the University of Greifswald.

== Selected works ==
- Die geschichtlichen hagiographen : (Chronika, Esra, Nehemia, Ruth, Esther) und das buch Daniel, 1889 – The historical hagiographer: (Chronicles, Ezra, Nehemiah, Ruth, Esther) and the Book of Daniel
- Das Deuteronomium, und Die Bucher Josua und Richter, 1893 – Deuteronomy, and the Books of Joshua and Judges.
- Der Kampf um Bibel und Babel : ein religionsgeschichtlicher Vortrag, 1903 – The struggle for the Bible and Babel: a religious history lecture.
- Das Gesetz Hammurabis und die Thora Israels; eine religions-und rechtsgeschichtliche Parallele, 1903 – The Law of Hammurabi and the Torah of Israel; A religious and legal-historical parallel.
- Geschichte Israels bis auf Alexander den Grossen, 1905 – The history of Israel up to Alexander the Great.
- Die Autorität des alten Testamentes für den Christen, 1906 – The authority of the Old Testament for Christians.
- Die revidierte Lutherbibel, 1908 – The revised Luther Bible.
- Das Buch Hiob : erläutert für Bibelleser, 1908 – The Book of Job.
