= Spelterini =

Spelterini is an Italian surname. Notable people with the surname include:

- Eduard Spelterini (1852–1931), Swiss balloonist and photographer
- Maria Spelterini (1853–1912), Italian tightrope walker
