= Paulus Züblin =

Swiss plantation owner and justice councilor in the Dutch colony of Berbice

Paulus Züblin (September 12, 1709 – August 2, 1760), also known as Paul Züblin or Paul Zubli, was a Swiss plantation owner, slaveholder, and justice councilor in the Dutch colony of Berbice.

== Life ==
=== Family ===
Paulus Züblin was part of the entrepreneurial Züblin family.

His sister Elisabeth Züblin (September 18, 1714 – April 27, 1788) was married to the preacher Caspar Tobias Zollikofer von Altenklingen (February 13, 1723 – January 30, 1800).

In 1749, Züblin married Cornelia Gertrud Versteer (May 17, 1733 – March 24, 1800) in Fort Nassau, present-day Guyana. She was the daughter of officer Jan Justus Versteer, from a milling family, and his wife Johanna Dorothea (née Lössner). Together, they had six children born between 1750 and 1760 in Berbice, one of whom died shortly after birth. His daughter Magdalena Johanna Züblin (April 27, 1750 – April 23, 1784) married jurist Johann Georg Zollikofer von Altenklingen (1751–1809) in 1774, the son of preacher Caspar Tobias Zollikofer von Altenklingen.

Paulus Züblin is considered the founder of the Dutch branch of the Züblin family.

=== Career ===
In the 1720s, he migrated via Holland to the Dutch colony of Berbice on the northeastern coast of South America. Upon arrival, he and Swiss merchant Nicolaas Huber, based in Amsterdam, applied for land grants of 200 hectares each, including enslaved people, which the Society of Berbice (see Society of Suriname) approved in 1736. The plots were surveyed in 1740 and appeared on maps from that year as coffee and food crop plantations along the middle course of the Berbice River, about five kilometers north of Fort Nassau. Züblin managed the plantation both from Berbice and Holland.

He found a Swiss, particularly St. Gallen-based, network in the region. Opposite his plantation Zublis Lust was the coffee and cotton plantation Helvetia, managed since 1737 by members of the St. Gallen families Rietmann, Högger, and Schlumpf. Nearby was Slingelant, owned by Thomas Ott from the Schaffhausen branch of the Ott family. Further upstream were Engeleburgh and Altenklingen, managed by Robert Sollicoffre of the St. Gallen merchant family Zollikofer.

== See also ==
- Switzerland–Suriname relations
