= Secondo =

Swiss umbrella term

The term Secondo (sg. m.) (Seconda (sg. f.)) is an umbrella term which has particularly been used in Switzerland. Secondo/Seconda is the Italian word for second and has been used to refer to people who are children of immigrants, were born in Switzerland and have been living in Switzerland for many years and might also be naturalised. The plural of the word Secondos is a mixture of the Italian singular secondo and the Spanish plural ending -s. This term is mostly used for the children of Italian and Spanish immigrants who migrated to Switzerland in the 1960s and 70s. Another term which is used by other countries to refer to the second generation of immigrants is second-generation. It is mostly considered as a positive term and is used by the people themselves too.

== Italians in Switzerland ==
The Italian population in Switzerland has been making up the biggest part of the country's group of foreign citizens that migrated to the country seeking work and better income. The number of Italians living in Switzerland has declined from 550,000 people in the year 1960 to 275,000 people 2013. The Italian community has coined the culture of Switzerland substantially and has become a big part of the country's economy and society.

Germany has been offering a special course for Secondos at the University of Regensburg since 2009. The goal of this course is to have the attendants reconnect with their country of origin, its culture and language.

== Immigration history and composition ==
The Swiss foreign population used to be very homogeneous, especially in the 1970s. It consisted mostly of people from southern European countries with 75% from neighbouring countries. Swiss companies were lacking employees and started to recruit people from countries surrounding Switzerland. These people were called guest workers. The idea of this sort of employment was that guest workers were supposed to return to their country of origin after a certain period of time.

Today, the composition is very different. People from the Balkan countries, Portugal, Spain, Turkey and especially the former countries of Yugoslavia are making up big parts of the Swiss population. Additionally, about 23% of foreigners were born in Switzerland and are therefore by definition Secondos/Secondas.

== Criticism of the term ==
Critics decline the term. The term Secondo has suffered after they have been accused of the riots and lootings on the International Workers' Day in Switzerland in the year 2002 where 14 people have been hurt and about 100 people were arrested. Police stated that many of the arrested were immigrants from the second and third generation. Critics say that the term excludes the persons concerned and forces their parents' migration history on them. Alternatives for the term are:

- children of immigrants
- second generation immigrant
- teenagers with foreign origin
