= House of Zili =

Patrician family of merchants

Zili
- Noble House
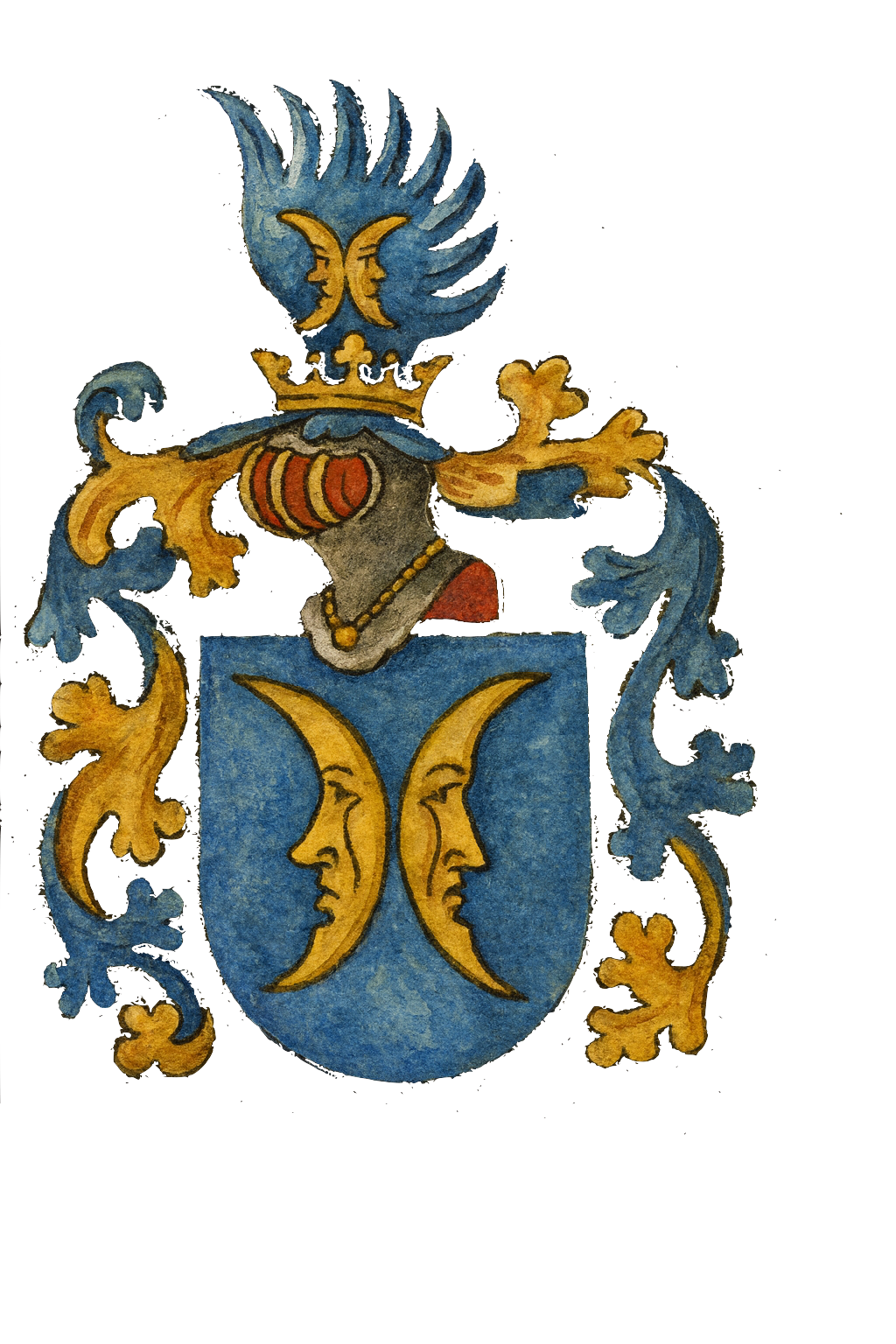
- Country: Switzerland
- Current region: Canton of St. Gallen
- Origin: St. Gallen
- Final head: Georg Leonhard Zili
- Titles: Mayor (non hereditary); Imperial Baliff (non hereditary); Notenstein Society Director (non hereditary); Guild Master (non hereditary)
- Dissolution: 1860

The House of Zili (also spelled Zyli, Zyly, Zilly) was a ruling patrician family of merchants from St. Gallen, attested from the 14th century and, by the 15th century, the wealthiest in the city thanks to the linen trade. The family became extinct in the 19th century. During the 16th and early 17th centuries, the Zili established economic and marital alliances with the leading ruling families of St. Gallen (von Watt, Grübel, Zollikofer, Wirth, and Rietmann) as well as with urban elites in southern Germany.

== History ==
With Heinrich Zili (mentioned in 1467), a member of the tailors’ guild, the family gained access to the office of mayor of St. Gallen for the first time in 1485. Heinrich also held the posts of bailiff of Steinach and Sax-Forstegg, supported the policies of Ulrich Varnbüler, and commanded the St. Gallen troops during the sack of the Rorschach monastery (1489) and the St. Gallen War (1490).

In 1559 Jakob Zili founded a trading company with his sons, after having been a partner (from 1519) with his brother-in-law Georg Zollikofer. Jakob chaired the Notenstein Society and held various civic offices, including mayor of the city (1546–1550) and member of the Small Council (from 1551). Under his leadership, the family consolidated its economic and social prestige.

Alongside the merchants, some members distinguished themselves as theologians. Anton Zili (1494–1571) and Dominik Zili promoted the Reformation in St. Gallen: Anton, a schoolmaster and later preacher at the church of St. Lawrence, was a spokesman of the Zwinglian Reformation in the religious disputations of Baden, Bern, and Basel, and in 1533 published the first collection of Swiss Reformed hymns.

From the late 16th century, the family reduced its political involvement, preferring military and diplomatic roles. Several members led the Notenstein Society, acquired country estates in the St. Gallen Rhine Valley, and adopted an aristocratic lifestyle. The decline of the linen industry in the first half of the 17th century also affected the family, which in 1657 withdrew from the Notenstein Society.

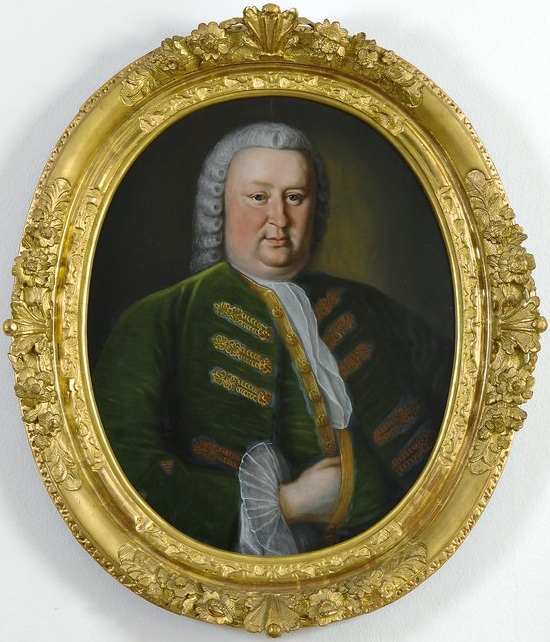
Caspar Zili.

With Hans Anton Zili (1677–1744) and his son Caspar Zili (1717–1758), the Zili restored their influence by focusing on commercial shipping. In 1733 they were readmitted to the Notenstein Society. The shipping company was later transformed by Wilhelm Zili (1813–1876), the last male-line representative of the family, into a bank, which was then taken over by his nephew and associate Emil Wegelin. The institution, known as Wegelin & Co. from 1893, was the oldest private bank in Switzerland until it ceased operations in 2013.

== Notable members ==
- Heinrich Zili (d. after 1500): cloth merchant, mayor of St. Gallen (1485 and 1488), commander of the city’s troops.
- Jakob Zili (1481–1563): wealthy linen merchant, president of the Notenstein Society, mayor and member of the Small Council of St. Gallen.
- Dominik Zili (b. before 1500 – 1542): Reformed theologian, preacher at St. Lawrence, key figure in the Reformation disputations.
- Anton Zili (1494–1571): theologian, member of the St. Gallen Reformation commission.
- Caspar Zili (1717–1758): shipping merchant, expanded the family enterprise into finance, later becoming Wegelin Bank.
- Georg Leonhard Zili (1774–1860): merchant and banker, acting treasurer-general of the Helvetic Republic’s army (1799), member of the St. Gallen Scientific Society.
- Wilhelm Zili (1813–1876): last male representative of the family, transformed the firm into a bank later managed by Emil Wegelin.
