= Zollikofer =

Zollikofer is a Swiss-German surname. Notable people with the surname include:

- Georg Joachim Zollikofer (1730–1788), Swiss-German theologian
- Johannes Zollikofer (1633–1692), Swiss Calvinist theologian
