= Notenstein La Roche Private Bank =

Coordinates: 47°25′35″N 9°22′39″E

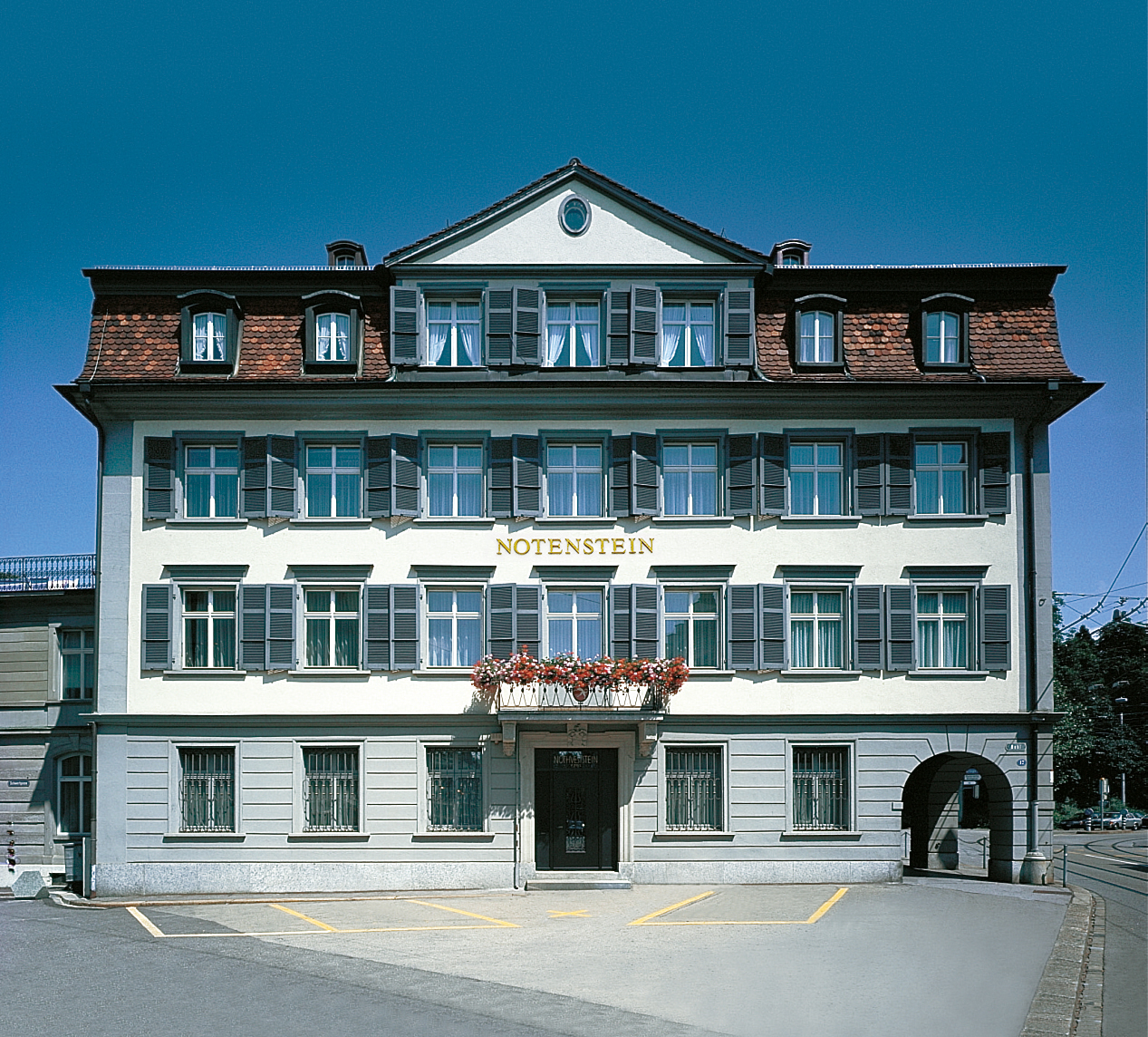
- Company type: Public company
- Industry: Financial services
- Founded: 2012
- Headquarters: St. Gallen, Switzerland
- Key people: Patrik Gisel (Chairman) Dr. Patrick Fürer (CEO)
- Products: private banking, asset management, structured products
- Number of employees: 400
- Website: www.notenstein-laroche.ch/en

Notenstein La Roche Private Bank was a Swiss private bank headquartered in St. Gallen and CHF 16.8 billion of client assets under management. The private bank, which had belonged to Raiffeisen (Switzerland) since 2012, was sold to Bank Vontobel in July 2018 and was fully integrated into that banking group as of 30 September 2018.

== Services ==
Notenstein La Roche Private Bank specialised in comprehensive wealth structuring for private clients. Notenstein La Roche Private Bank's core competencies included wealth management and investment advisory services, financial and pension planning, as well as providing financing and supporting external asset managers.

== History ==
Notenstein Private Bank and Bank La Roche merged at the end of 2015. Both banks look back on histories stretching back centuries. Notenstein's history has its roots in St. Gallen; Bank La Roche's in Basel. Both bank houses have more in common than history and tradition, however: they also share the same fundamental values and business ethics.

=== Notenstein ===
The city of St. Gallen enjoyed an economic upswing in the late Middle Ages thanks to its flourishing textile industry. The proprietors of the leading trading companies met regularly at the assembly house “zum Notenstein” on the lower Neugasse. In 1555, a new meeting place was established in a house near the Brühltor, the location of the private bank's headquarters today. Members of the influential Notenstein association, along with other guilds, were involved in city government. One of Notenstein's most illustrious members was the St. Gallen scholar Joachim von Watt, known as Vadianus, who went on to become mayor. In 1741, Caspar Zyli, member of a family long affiliated with the Notenstein association, established a shipping and trading company; by the mid-1800s it had developed into a pure banking business. The incursion of the French in 1798 and the demise of the old order also spelled the end for the rich traditions of the Notenstein merchants: the association was dissolved and the house sold to Caspar Zyli's son Hans Anton.

=== La Roche ===
At the end of the 18th century, Basel was a centre for international trade, and the silk ribbon industry had emerged as the city's most important business sector. In these surroundings, Benedikt La Roche, whose great-grandfather's military prowess in the service of the French crown had earned him the privilege of using the sobriquet “La Roche”, founded a trading and freight forwarding company La Roche & Co. in 1787. In the wake of the economic crisis of 1800, growing demand for industrial capital caused the trading company's banking arm to become increasingly important. By the end of the century, La Roche was active in financing projects ranging from the Spanisch-Brötli-Bahn railway to a brewery. Basel attained world prominence as a financial centre during the Franco-Prussian War of 1870. At this time, the bank was among the founders of the Basel stock exchange. Although the inter-war years were challenging for the bank, the end of the Second World War heralded a period of growth and prosperity. Through the 1970s and 1980s the bank transitioned from an all-purpose bank to a classic private bank, in which investment advice, wealth management and servicing institutional clients became the core business. The bank celebrated its 225th anniversary in 2012.

=== Wegelin & Co. ===
The history of Wegelin & Co. dates back to 1741 when Caspar Zyli, member of a family long affiliated with the Notenstein association, established a shipping and trading company. By the mid-1800s it had developed into a pure banking business. The incursion of the French in 1798 and the demise of the old order also spelled the end for the rich traditions of the Notenstein merchants: the association was dissolved. In 1893, the "Caspar Zyli trading company" became Wegelin & Co.

In early 2012, as part of a tax dispute between the US and Swiss banks, the US Department of Justice focused its sights on Wegelin & Co. The partners determined to break up the bank on 27 January 2012: business with clients in the US and US citizens (around 5%) remained with Wegelin & Co., while all other clients and business units were transferred to a separate entity – the new Notenstein Private Bank. Thanks to the previous existence of a second bank licence and name rights, the transaction was swift: the non-US business was transferred to Nettobank AG, a partner company of Wegelin & Co. with its own banking license. It was then renamed Notenstein Private Bank, the rights to the name coming from the real estate company Notenstein AG (founded in 1968), a subsidiary of Wegelin & Co.
