= Capital Markets and Technology Association =

- Abbreviation: CMTA
- Website: cmta.ch

The Capital Markets and Technology Association (CMTA) is a Swiss association that aims to facilitate access to capital markets through new technologies.

== Mission ==
The CMTA's mission is to define standards for fundraising through distributed ledger technology, ensuring a high level of trust in these methods. These standards also help market participants avoid duplication of development efforts.

== History ==
The CMTA was created in 2018 by Swiss financial players. They started from the observation that SMEs had difficulty accessing the capital markets, because the sums they need are too small to compensate for the costs of operations such as an initial public offering (IPO). As for digital technologies that allow raising funds through tokens, these actors consider them to be too unstandardized and may pose trust problems. They therefore decided to combine traditional equity or debt securities with digital tokens to reduce transaction costs.

A test conducted at the end of 2022 made it possible to exchange financial products in the form of digital tokens and in Swiss francs, on BX Swiss, an exchange authorized by the Swiss Financial Market Supervisory Authority.

== Published standards ==
- Prospectus Model (model prospectus for the public offering of tokenized shares in Switzerland), February 2020
- DvP Smart Contract (Delivery versus Payment (DvP) Smart Contract), December 2022
- RuleEngine for CMTAT (RuleEngine contract for the CMTAT framework), January 2023
- Digital Assets AML Standards (Guidance for businesses and financial intermediaries on handling digital assets in compliance with Swiss anti money laundering regulation), September 2024
- Standard for the tokenization of shares of Swiss corporations using the distributed ledger technology (step-by-step guide to tokenizing equity securities in Switzerland), September 2024
- Standard for the tokenization of debt instruments using distributed ledger technology (step-by-step guide to tokenizing debt securities such as bonds, notes, structured products and other non-equity instruments), May 2025
- Digital Assets Custody Standard (set of industry-developed requirements and recommendations for technology solutions enabling the secure custody and management of digital assets), August 2025
- CMTA Token (CMTAT) (framework enabling the tokenization of equity and debt securities, including structured products), September 2025

== Members ==
The organization's members include players from the finance, legal, higher education and economic sectors.

- Lenz & Staehelin (Law Firm), founding member
- Temenos (banking software publisher), founding member
- Swissquote (bank), founding member
- Aktionariat AG
- 21 Shares
- Alphemy Capital SA
- Amina Bank AG
- Arab Bank (Switzerland)
- Bundesverband für elektronische Wertpapiere e.V.
- Baker McKenzie
- Vontobel
- Banque Lombard Odier
- Banque Pictet & Cie
- Blockchain Innovation Group AG
- Blockchain Lawyers Forum
- BX Digital AG
- Chiron Financial (Switzerland) LLC
- Cité Gestion SA
- Chambre Vaudoise du Commerce et de l’Industrie
- Finstar
- Fireblocks
- Haute école de gestion de Genève
- Homburger
- Hypothekarbank Lenzburg AG
- Jacquemond Stanislas
- MME Legal
- Niederer Kraft Frey AG
- Nox Labs
- OA Legal
- Six Digital Exchange
- Swiss Association of Wealth Managers
- Swiss Blockchain Federation
- Swiss Fintech Association
- Sygnum Bank AG
- Tauris SA
- Tezos Foundation
- UBS AG
- Union bancaire privée
