= Utermann =

Utermann is a surname. Notable people with the surname include:

- Andreas Utermann (born 1966), Anglo-German businessman
- Wilhelm Utermann (1912–1991), German writer
