= Ieronim (Ponyatsky) =

Ieronim Ponyatskiy (1749 – 4 (16) July 1802) was a Russian clergyman and monastic, an archimandrite and igumen of several Russian monasteries.

Ieronim came from a family of clergymen. He was educated at the Smolensk Spiritual Seminary, he then (according to some sources) graduated from the Slavic Greek Latin Academy, and began service as a hieromonk in the navy. In 1790–1792 he was a teacher in the Kiev Theological Academy.

From 1792 on he was the igumen of the Smolensk Holy Trinity Monastery; from 1794 on an archimandrite in the Pechersky Ascension Monastery in Nizhny Novgorod and the rector of the Nizhny Novgorod Spiritual Seminary; from January 17, 1799 on, he was an archimandrite in the New Jerusalem Monastery, where he eventually was buried. On the preserved cast-iron tombstone there are relief images and the inscription: "In this place was buried the body of the former igumen of this Stauropegial New Jerusalem Resurrection Monastery, Archimandrite Ieronim, who deceased in the Lord. This took place on 4 June 1802. He lived to be 52 years and 7 months old.

== Works ==
Ieronim also was a writer and translator. Some his translations include:

- Guide to parents and caregivers, St. Petersburg, 1798.
- Zollikofer: Reliable guidance to parents, educators and teachers for sensible Christian children's upbringing.
- Harwood’s thoughts of the bliss of the pious, Moscow, 1783.

Ieronim's published sermons includes:

- "On the day of the accession to the throne of Emperor Paul", St. Petersburg, 1797.
- "On the occasion of the consecration of the Church of Mary Magdalene", (M., 1801).

Also published were his poems and speeches in honor of General-in-chief Fyodor Ivanovich Glebov, St. Petersburg, 1776.

== Sources ==
- Simankov, V.I. (2010). "Из разысканий о журнале "Прибавление к Московским Ведомостям"…" [‘From searches for the magazine "Addition to the Moscow Vedomosti" .... - Kharkov, 2010. - 134 p.’] (PDF) (in Russian).
- "Настоятели нижегородского Вознесенского Печерского и Воскресенского Ново-Иерусалимского монастырей архимандриты Иероним (Поняцкий) и Гедеон (Ильин)" [‘’]. Нижегородская старина (in Russian). 2005. Archived from the original on 8 November 2018.
