= Amalie Raiffeisen =

German social reformer (1846–1897)

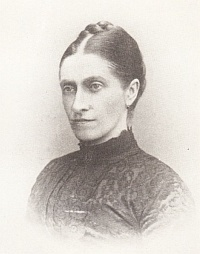
Raiffeisen in an unknown date

Amalie Raiffeisen (2 August 1846 – 11 January 1897) was a German social reformer.

By the 1860s, her father, Friedrich Wilhelm Raiffeisen, was almost blind. By handling his correspondence with him she was indispensable in his creation of the Cooperative movement in Germany.

She grew up in a religious family and was educated according to the social precepts of the time, accepting that even after reaching adulthood it was her duty to respect her father's wishes. These involved shunning marriage in order to stay by her father's side and help him in his work. After Friedrich Wilhelm Raiffeisen eventually died, in 1888, she continued to work for the Cooperative movement. From 1892 until her own death, she was the only surviving family member with shares in the undertaking.

== Life ==
=== Childhood ===
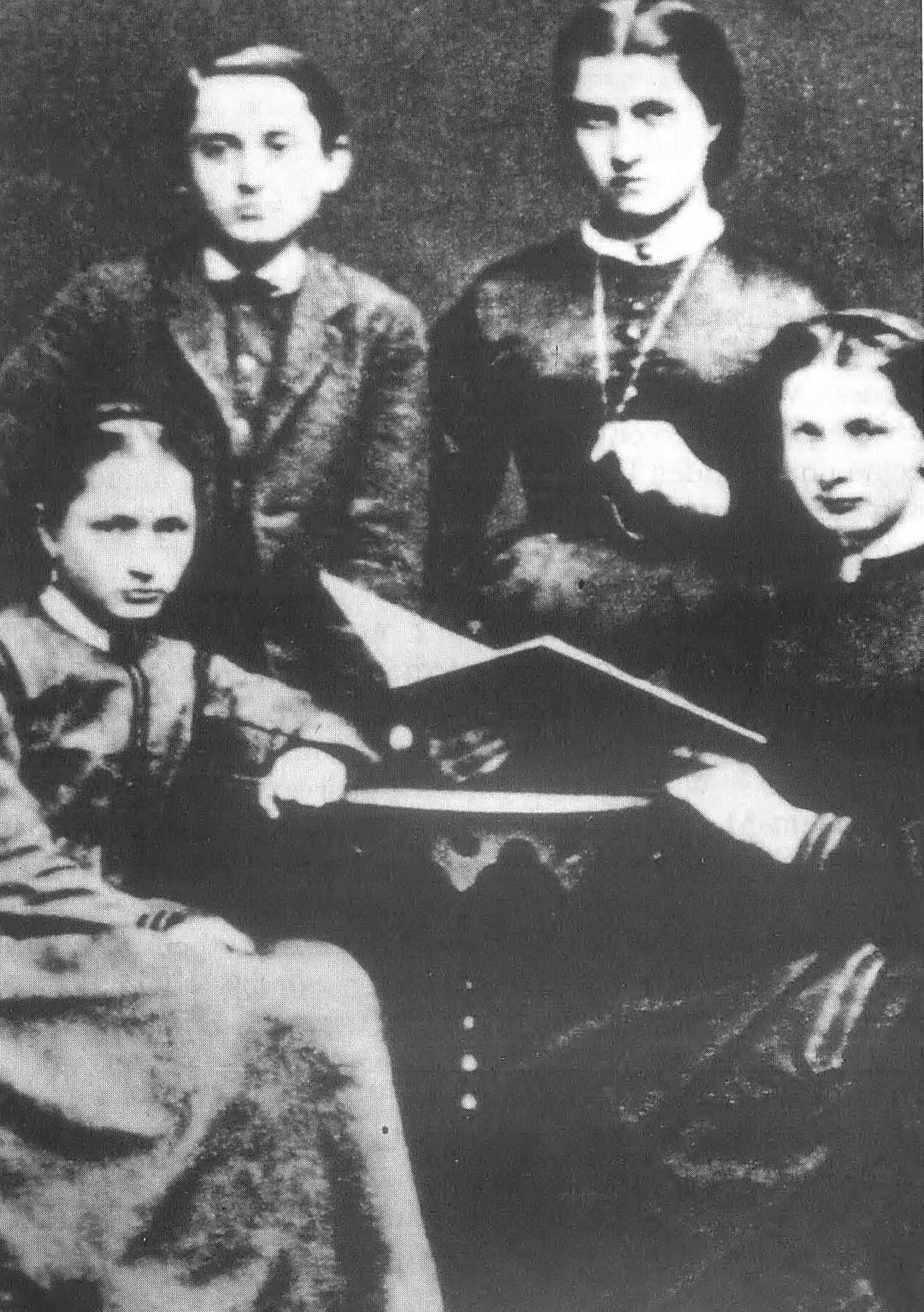
The children of Friedrich Wilhelm Raiffeisen Standing at the back: Rudolf and Amalie Seated at the front: Bertha and [Caro]lina

Amalie Justine Caroline Raiffeisen was born early in the morning at the family home in Weyerbusch, a small town near Altenkirchen, roughly 50 km/30 miles to the north of Koblenz. She was the eldest of her parents' seven recorded children. Her father, Friedrich Wilhelm Raiffeisen, was the mayor of the little town. Almost thirty years after Amalie's birth her father recalled the day in a letter, describing how during the birth he had sat in the garden thanking God for this gift and at the same time asking for His blessings on the child's behalf. When the children were small their education was entrusted to their mother, Emilie. It was only when they were a little older that their father, who already had a busy work schedule, joined in the task. For the parents it was important that their children led a well ordered and properly scheduled day-to-day life. As soon as she was old enough, Amalie was required to submit, each evening, a work plan for the following day, with "Free hours" to be determined by her father. If she was staying away from home with relatives or friends, she was required to produce similar daily agendas for days away. Her father then insisted that tasks should be carried out as planned, including jobs which in other families of equivalent class and background would be the exclusive preserve of the household servants.

At the same time the father set great store by a sound schooling for his daughter. After attending the local school she was sent on to a Ladies' College. Being a school girl did not excuse her from her domestic duties when she got home each day. She was still expected to help the maids with cleaning the house and to help in the garden, especially with regard to cultivating the potatoes. Friedrich Wilhelm Raiffeisen lived by the biblical precept, Love they neighbour as thyself. His children, starting with the eldest, Amalie, were each required to find a local poor family, and take responsibility for the family's upkeep and welfare. To achieve this they had to collect donations from wealthier families and personally hand the cash over to the family for which they had taken responsibility.

Raiffeisen's own family lived in relatively simple circumstances. Friedrich Wilhelm was himself one of nine recorded siblings: the salary he received for his duties as a small-town mayor was barely enough to support his large family, so that conspicuous consumption and luxuries were not possible. Amalie's childhood was also defined by the chronic poor health of her parents. Her father had already, in 1843, been turned down for military service because of his failing eye-sight, and despite regularly taking "cures", his vision continued to deteriorate. Her mother suffered from chronic heart problems, possibly on account of seven difficult home births. After the birth of her youngest child (who died in infancy) in 1859, doctors who were consulted concluded that she would never recover her health, and she died on 27 July 1863. That same year Friedrich Wilhelm Raiffeisen drew up his own will: still not fully recovered from a savage attack of typhoid fever, he was evidently mindful that the children might be entirely orphaned at an early age.

=== Working on her father's co-operative enterprises ===
Amalie Raiffeisen was just 17 when her mother died. As the eldest daughter she took over responsibility for running the house and for the education of her younger siblings. Her father's eyesight had deteriorated sharply when he was ill with typhoid fever. On 2 September 1856 the district councillor Friedrich von Runkel wrote of him that he probably was having his letters read by his office assistants and his daughter, being no longer able to read for himself. Since Raiffeissen could no longer see what he was signing, he was retired from his public office on 21 September 1865. Because of his truncated public career he only received a small partial pension which created financial difficulties for the family. Financial difficulties were exacerbated because he had not been able to build up his savings when he had been working, due to the frequency of his health cures and his generous financial help for the poor and needy. In order to secure a better income for the family he set up a cigar factory, but this was barely profitable and was soon shut down. He then set up a wine wholesale business. In his daily business dealings he was dependent on the help of his daughter, Amalie.

In 1864 Friedrich Wilhelm Raiffeisen had set up the "Heddesdorfer Darlehensverein" ("Heddesdorf Credit Union"). He wrote up and published his experiences with the credit union and with his earlier experiences as mayor in Weyerbusch (1845-1848) and subsequently in the rural district of Flemersfled, in a publication entitled "The Credit Union as a way to address the needs of the rural population and of artisans and workers" ("Die Darlehnskassen-Vereine als Mittel zur Abhilfe der Noth der ländlichen Bevölkerung sowie auch der städtischen Handwerker und Arbeiter"). He dictated and Amalie wrote down the 227 page book.

Her father was exhausted by the work involved in publishing the book and had to go away on a health cure. Amalie, by now aged 20, was left to run the home and the wine handling business, which she did, for the most part, alone. In 1867 the father wrote in a letter to his children of how greatly troubled he had become by his failure to generate more income, and he asked that if her were to die, his children should attend to the repayment of all his debts. Along with her responsibilities at home, Amalie attended to the continuing implementation of her father's Co-operative movement projects. Burdened by so much responsibility at such a young age, she was no doubt frequently overwhelmed by her father's decision to marry again: he decided to marry the widow Maria Penserot in 1868.

A second edition of Raiffeisen's book appeared in 1872: it had grown to 352 pages. The complete rework had again been written by Amalie, at her father's dictation. In the first biography of Friedrich Wilhelm Raiffeisen, which was produced by a temporary employee called Martin Faßbender, Amalie's daily routine was described. She rose early from bed. After a very light breakfast and a brief walk Friedrich Wilhelm and Amalie attended to the correspondence and then turned to working on the book. Details of the paperwork were for most purposes kept secret, and Amalie was described at the time as her father's "confidential secretary" ("Geheimsekretär"). Meanwhile, the father prepared to re-balance the burden by arranging for his eldest son, Amalie's brother Rudolf, to receive a commercial training. This might have been expected to reduce the burden on Amalie, although in 1872 her younger sister, Carolina, married and left the family home.

On 1 October 1876, Rudolf was conscripted to volunteer for a year of military service. The cost of his upkeep and accommodation in the barracks placed a financial burden on the family. Raiffeisen found himself forced to employ a manager for the wine business. An attempt to sell the business failed due to lack of offers. Meanwhile, Rudolf fell into disgrace while undertaking his military service. Details are unclear, but he was unable to return home. On Amalie's advice, he emigrated at the end of 1877, probably to Spain. The prospect of any diminution in Amalie's own workload receded.

From a letter that Amalie wrote in 1877 it is apparent that she had a wide circle of friends and acquaintances, even as far away as England. In the same letter she writes of her love of children and a desire to become a mother on her own account. On 15 May 1878, Bertha, another of her sisters, married and left the parental home. Amalie stayed behind, alone with her father.

In 1880 Friedrich Wilhelm Raiffeisen announced his intention to launch a new enterprise into which he would sink his entire fortune. Serious family ructions ensued, partly because he demanded that his children renounce their inheritances from their mother. By October 1881 he had persuaded his three daughters, starting with Amalie, to do this. In the meantime both his son Rudolf and his daughter Bertha had broken off all contact with him, a situation which in Rudolf's case would endure. The problem of succession within the family enterprises became ever more pressing. In 1880 Martin Faßbender was appointed, with a view to preserving the old man's spiritual inheritance after he had gone. It was Faßbender who later wrote the first published biography of Friedrich Wilhelm Raiffeisen. However, as far as the spiritual inheritance it was Faßbender who departed first, resigning after two years because he was unable to see any way to implement any ideas of his own. The parting was outwardly amicable, although Faßbender's later dealings against Raiffeisen were vicious.

This proved a turning point for Amalie. Faßbender himself later wrote that the father loved his daughter deeply, but found it quite impossible to see her as an individual with her own needs and wants, which greatly impacted the daughter's happiness. Faßbender had lived in the Raiffeisen household, and it is believed that he fell in love with Amalie and wanted to marry her. At the time there were clearly passionately held differences between Raiffeisen and Faßbender over the future development of the co-operative movement, and the father vetoed any marriage between his daughter and Faßbender. When Faßbender left, Raiffeisen was seriously worried that he might be about to lose Amalie as well, which made him realise just how dependent on her, as his "substitute eyes", he had become.

Another reason that Raiffeisen forbad his daughter from marrying Faßbender may have involved plans that he had to convert his co-operative organisation into a quasi-monastic brotherhood. There could never have been any question of Raiffeisen himself becoming leader of such an order, because he had been twice married, and the scheme that he had in mind required celibacy for the members of the order. It is not impossible that he was lining up Faßbender and Amalie as "lead brother" and "lead sister" for it, which would have required lifelong celibacy.

The volume of correspondence that Amalie handled for her father became ever greater. In 1881 it left her unable to visit her sister and the nephews and nieces whom she loved. In a letter she wrote Carolina in November 1881 she complained that her work was becoming increasingly burdensome, that she was permanently exhausted, and that their father forbad her everything. Taken together, her father's battle with her brother and sisters, the departure of Faßbender and the amount of work involved in producing a fourth edition of her father's book, came close to crushing her. She attempted to arrange a meeting with her father to discuss the issues, but he still failed to acknowledge her needs, and during his final years she simply became resigned to the situation that had developed, neither fighting against her father's approach nor attempting to leave home.

Three and a half years before he died, while away from home on another of his health cures, Friedrich Wilhelm Raiffeisen wrote his eldest daughter a letter in which he praised her as a strong loving support and counsellor in his cares troubles, and a great comfort in troubled times. He thanked God for her.

=== Final years and early death ===
At the end of 1887 Amalie's brother, Rudolf, returned from Spain, probably at their father's request. He announced that he was resolved to progress his father's work, and to work on it together with his father. Friedrich Wilhelm threw himself into their affairs with renewed energy, probably attempting to do too much. He died suddenly and unexpectedly on 11 March 1888. Amalie inherited 7/24 of his estate and, in recognition of twenty years of service, all his movable chattels and two life insurance policies each worth 1,000 Thalers. She systematically sorted through her dead father's correspondence, making some of it available to Martin Faßbender. Most of it she burned, however.

It is not known whether Amalie continued to work as a secretary and writer after her father died. She remained a shareholder in her father's firm, "Raiffeisen & Cons" for the rest of her life, and tried to support her brother Rudolf. At the same time she had to watch while he was removed from office for personal and economic reasons. As a shareholder, having regard to his education and career to date, she did not prevent her brother being forced out of the firm on 28 November 1892.

Amalie lived in Heddesdorf till her death on 11 January 1897. The local register gives her cause of death as Hydrothorax (Brustwassersucht). Her death marked the break between the Raiffeisen family and the co-operative organisation. Her body was buried in the same grave as her father's.

== Celebration and commemoration ==
Amalie Raiffeisen was a recipient of the Cross of Merit for Women and Girls ("Ehrenkreuz für Frauen und Jungfrauen").

Although there are numerous references to her in biographical works on her father, the first published biographical research to focus on Amalie Raiffesen was produced by Walter Koch (author) and first appeared only in 1995. That same year the text was reduced and, complemented by citations and documents, published in a biographical compilation produced by the Women's Office (Frauenbüro) in Neuwied.

Amalie Raiffeisen's crucial role in her father's work is reflected in a determination within the Cooperative movement that a postage stamp, to be issued in March 2018 to celebrate the two hundredth anniversary of the father's birth, should feature the two of them together.
