= Hans Vontobel =

Swiss banker (1916–2016)

- Born: Hans Jakob Vontobel; December 4, 1916; Zürich, Switzerland
- Died: January 3, 2016 (aged 99); Zürich, Switzerland
- Occupations: Private banker, financier, philanthropist
- Known for: President and majority shareholder of Vontobel
- Children: 3

Hans Jakob Vontobel (December 4, 1916 - January 3, 2016) was a Swiss private banker and philanthropist. He was the former president of Vontobel between 1984 and 1994 and honorary president until his death. He held approximately 20% of controlling shares of the private bank. He was the patriarch of the Vontobel banking family.

== Early life and education ==
Vontobel was born December 4, 1916, in Zürich, Switzerland, to Jakob (1885-1976) and his wife Emma (née Höhn; 1887–1978). He was raised in Zürich-Fluntern. After completing his Matura, he studied Jurisprudence at the University of Zürich, followed by a trainee program at Pictet & Cie in Geneva. Vontobel completed his JD in 1942 with Gottfried Weiss and the dissertation titled "The elimination of the competences of welfare authorities and courts in the welfare of children of divorce".

== Career ==
In 1943, he entered the small private bank of his father, then J. Vontobel & Cie., which employed 12 people. In 1951, he became a junior partner and therefore unlimited partner. In 1984, the bank was turned into a corporation, and Vontobel became its president. In 1994, he was succeeded by his son Hans-Dieter Vontobel and remained honorary president to his death. Between 1967 and 1985, Vontobel additionally served as president of the Swiss-German Chamber of Commerce and from 1970 to 1990 president of the Swiss Bankers Association. Between 1961 and 1971, he was also engaged as a member of the management of the Zürich Stock Exchange and from 1972 to 1986 he was president of Neue Zürcher Zeitung.

== Personal life ==
Vontobel was married and had three children; Hans-Dieter, Kathrin and Regula.

== Awards ==
- Order of Merit of Baden-Württemberg (1980)
- Bavarian Order of Merit (1982)
- Honorary Doctorate of University of Bratislava (1996)
- Permanent Honorary Guest of University of Zürich (2009)
- Order of Merit of the Federal Republic of Germany
