= Friedrich Wilhelm Raiffeisen =

German cooperative pioneer (1818–1888)

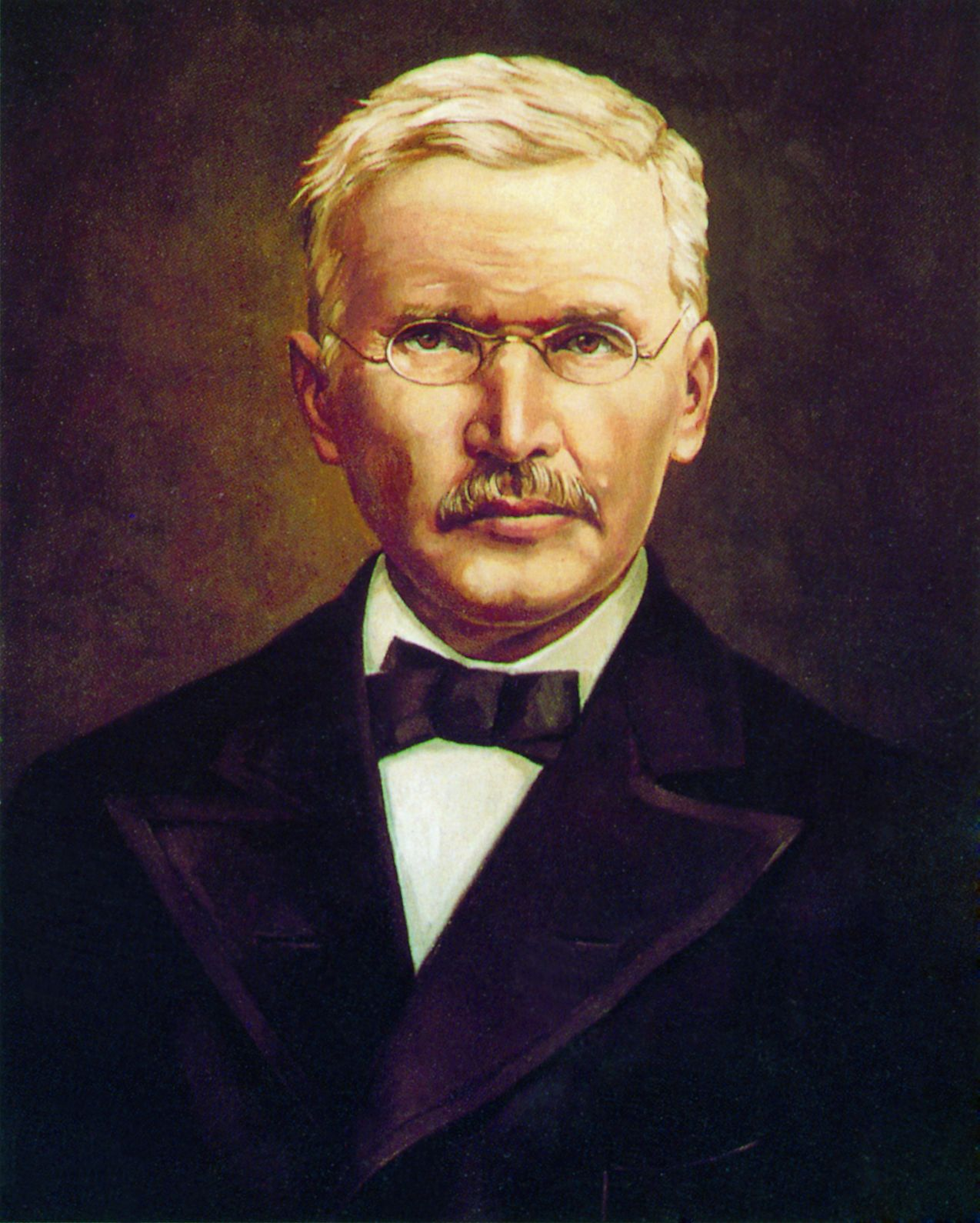
- Portrait, c. 1870
- Born: 30 March 1818; Hamm (Sieg), Kingdom of Prussia, German Confederation
- Died: 11 March 1888 (aged 69); Neuwied, Kingdom of Prussia, German Empire
- Known for: Pioneer of cooperative banking and credit unions
- Spouse(s): Emilie Storck (1843); Maria Panseroth (1867)
- Children: Amalie Raiffeisen (1846-1897) six others
- Parent(s): Gottfried Friedrich Raiffeisen; Amalie Christiane S. M. Lantzendörffer

Friedrich Wilhelm Raiffeisen (30 March 1818 – 11 March 1888) was a German mayor and cooperative pioneer. Several credit union systems and cooperative banks have been named after Raiffeisen, who pioneered rural credit unions.

== Life ==
Friedrich Wilhelm Raiffeisen was born on 30 March 1818 at Hamm/Sieg, Westerwald region. He was the seventh of nine children. His father Gottfried Friedrich Raiffeisen was a farmer and also served as the mayor of Hamm. His family’s origins trace back to the 16th century in the Swabian-Franconian region. The family of his mother, Amalie Christiane Susanna Maria, born Lantzendörffer, came from the Siegerland region. Leaving school at the age of 14 he received three years of education from a local pastor before entering the military at the age of 17. His career in the military led him to Cologne, Koblenz, and Sayn. After an eye disease forced him to resign from military service in 1843 he entered public service. He served as the mayor of several towns: from 1845 he was the mayor of Weyerbusch/Westerwald; from 1848 the mayor of Flammersfeld/Westerwald; and the mayor of Heddesdorf from 1852 until late 1865, when, at the age of 47, his worsening health cut his career short. He had contracted typhus in 1863 during an epidemic which took his wife's life. As his small pension was not sufficient to meet the needs of Raiffeisen’s family he initially started a small cigar factory and later a wine business.

In 1867, he married the widow Maria Panseroth. She outlived him by 12 years and their marriage remained childless. He died on 11 March 1888 in Neuwied-Heddesdorf, shortly before his 70th birthday.

== Work ==
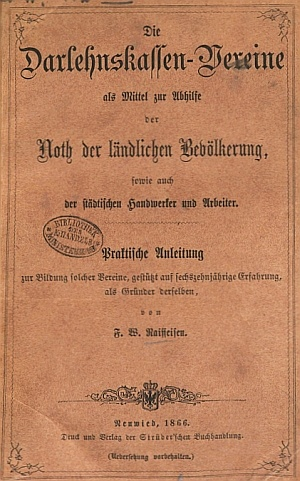
The cover of "Raiffeisen-Ratgeber: Die Darlehnskassen-Vereine" 1866 by Friedrich Wilhelm Raiffeisen. In it Raiffeisen sets out how to establish credit unions and other co-operatives.

In 1872, Raiffeisen created the first rural central bank at Neuwied, the “Rheinische Landwirtschaftliche Genossenschaftsbank” (Rhenish Agricultural Cooperative Bank). In 1881, Raiffeisen created a printing house in Neuwied that still exists today, carries his name and was merged in 1975 with the German cooperative publishing house “Deutscher Genossenschafts-Verlag”.

== Philosophy ==
Raiffeisen stated that there is a connection between poverty and dependency. To fight poverty one should fight dependency first. Based on this idea he came up with the three 'S' formula: self-help, self-governance, and self-responsibility (in the original German: Selbsthilfe, Selbstverwaltung, and Selbstverantwortung). When put into practice, the necessary independence from charity, politics, and loan sharks could be established.

== Organizations named for Raiffeisen ==
Several credit unions are named after Raiffeisen:

- Raiffeisen Zentralbank, RZB, a cooperative bank based in Austria, and operating in Eastern Europe.
  - The Kosovo subsidiary of RZB sponsors the soccer Raiffeisen Superleague of Kosovo.
- Bundesverband der Deutschen Volksbanken und Raiffeisenbanken, a federation of Raiffeisen cooperatives in Germany.
- Raiffeisen (Switzerland), the federation of Raiffeisen cooperative banks in Switzerland.
- Federazione Raiffeisen (Alto Adige - Sudtirol, Italia), the federation of Raiffeisen cooperative banks in the autonome province of Bozen, Sudtirol.
- Raiffeisen Bank (Romania), a branch of the Raiffeisen Zentralbank.
- Rabobank, officially Coöperatieve Centrale Raiffeisen-Boerenleenbank B.A., cooperative banking system in the Netherlands.
- Banque Raiffeisen, Luxembourg.
- KBC Bank, the C stands for Cera (Belgium) (Centrale Raiffeisenkas, meaning Central Raiffeisen Bank). Cera is a cooperative with 400.000 members and the largest shareholder of KBC Bank.

== See also ==
- Bond of association
- Franz Hermann Schulze-Delitzsch
- History of credit unions
- Microfinance
