= Von Watt family =

Merchant family of St. Gallen

von Watt family
- Country: Switzerland
- Place of origin: Probably Watt (Mörschwil)
- Founded: 14th century (citizenship of St. Gallen)
- Members: Hug von Watt; Peter von Watt; Hektor von Watt; Joachim Vadian
- Dissolution: Second half of the 17th century (St. Gallen)
- Cadet branches: Nuremberg (until the 1560s); Kraków (until 1594); Posen (now Poznań)

The von Watt family was an important family of St. Gallen whose members acquired citizenship of the city in the 14th century. The family rose through the long-distance trade in St. Gallen linen and repeatedly held high political offices in the 15th and 16th centuries. Its most outstanding member in St. Gallen was Joachim Vadian. Branches of the family formed in Nuremberg, Kraków and Posen; in St. Gallen the family died out in the second half of the 17th century.

== History ==
The family probably came from Watt, in the municipality of Mörschwil, and its members acquired citizenship of St. Gallen in the 14th century. It owed its rise to long-distance trade in St. Gallen linen. In the 15th and 16th centuries the von Watt repeatedly held high political offices and allied themselves with other respected and wealthy St. Gallen families, such as the Zili and the Zollikofer.

Konrad, who was mayor in 1402, fell in 1403 in the Battle of Vögelinsegg. His son Hug founded the Diesbach-Watt Company in the first half of the 15th century, together with Peter and the Bernese Niklaus von Diesbach. (Note: Sources disagree: the HDS article on the Diesbach-Watt Company calls Peter and Hug brothers, while the HDS article on Peter von Watt says his relationship to the rest of the family is uncertain.) Hug also acquired estates that remained in the family's possession for a long time, and in 1430, together with his two brothers Hans (died 1458/1459) and Konrad (died 1469/1470) and with Peter, he received a grant of arms (Wappenbrief) from King Sigismund. Peter, who moved to Nuremberg and acquired citizenship there in 1428, became the progenitor of the Nuremberg branch, whose descendants are recorded until the 1560s.

Hektor, Hug's son, was mayor of St. Gallen every third year from 1460 to 1474. His grandson of the same name was a merchant in the east and became a citizen of Kraków in 1510; the Kraków branch of the family, recorded until 1594, descends from him. The most outstanding member of the family in St. Gallen was Joachim, known as Vadian. Konrad, a brother of Vadian, left St. Gallen, became a citizen of Posen (now Poznań, Poland) in 1517 and founded the Posen branch of the family. In St. Gallen the family died out in the second half of the 17th century.

== Bibliography ==
- W. Näf, Die Familie von Watt, 1936
- H. C. Peyer, Leinwandgewerbe und Fernhandel der Stadt St. Gallen von den Anfängen bis 1520, vol. 2, 1960, pp. 48–51

=== Archives ===
- Stadtarchiv St. Gallen (City Archives of St. Gallen), Stemmatologia Sangallensis
