= La Roche & Co. =

Swiss private bank

Bank La Roche & Co Ltd was a Swiss private bank, headquartered in Basel and founded in 1787 by Benedikt La Roche. It was organised in the form of an Aktiengesellschaft. The bank specialised in asset management for private customers and institutional investors. The bank had subsidiaries in Bern and Olten, and an office in Zurich. It had 120 employees as of 2011. The company was originally named Benedikt La Roche, and the name was changed to La Roche & Co. in 1892.

In March 2018, La Roche & Co, was acquired and integrated into the Vontobel Group.
