= Twentyfour Income Fund =

British investment trust

- Type: Investment trust
- Traded as: LSE: TFIF; FTSE 250 component
- Industry: Property investment
- Founded: 2013; 13 years ago
- Headquarters: Saint Peter Port, Guernsey
- Key people: Trevor Ash (Chairman)
- Products: Investing in less liquid, higher yield investments
- Website: www.twentyfouram.com

Twentyfour Income Fund is a British investment trust dedicated to investing in less liquid, higher yield investments. It is listed on the London Stock Exchange and it is a constituent of the FTSE 250 Index.

== History ==
The company was established in 2013. Twentyfour, part of the Vontobel Group, was appointed manager. In March 2022, the company announced that it would merge with UK Mortgages in a transaction worth £700 million. The transaction resulted in UK Mortgages being wound up. The chairman is Trevor Ash.
