= Raiffeisen (Switzerland) =

Cooperative of Swiss banks

Coordinates: 47.421765°N 9.373231°E

Raiffeisen Switzerland
- Company type: Cooperative; Public company
- Industry: financial sector
- Founded: 1899
- Headquarters: St. Gallen, Switzerland
- Number of locations: 880 locations
- Key people: Heinz Huber (CEO), Guy Lachappelle (BoD Chairman)
- Total assets: ≈ 225 Mrd. CHF
- Number of employees: 9,215 (full-time positions)
- Website: raiffeisen.ch

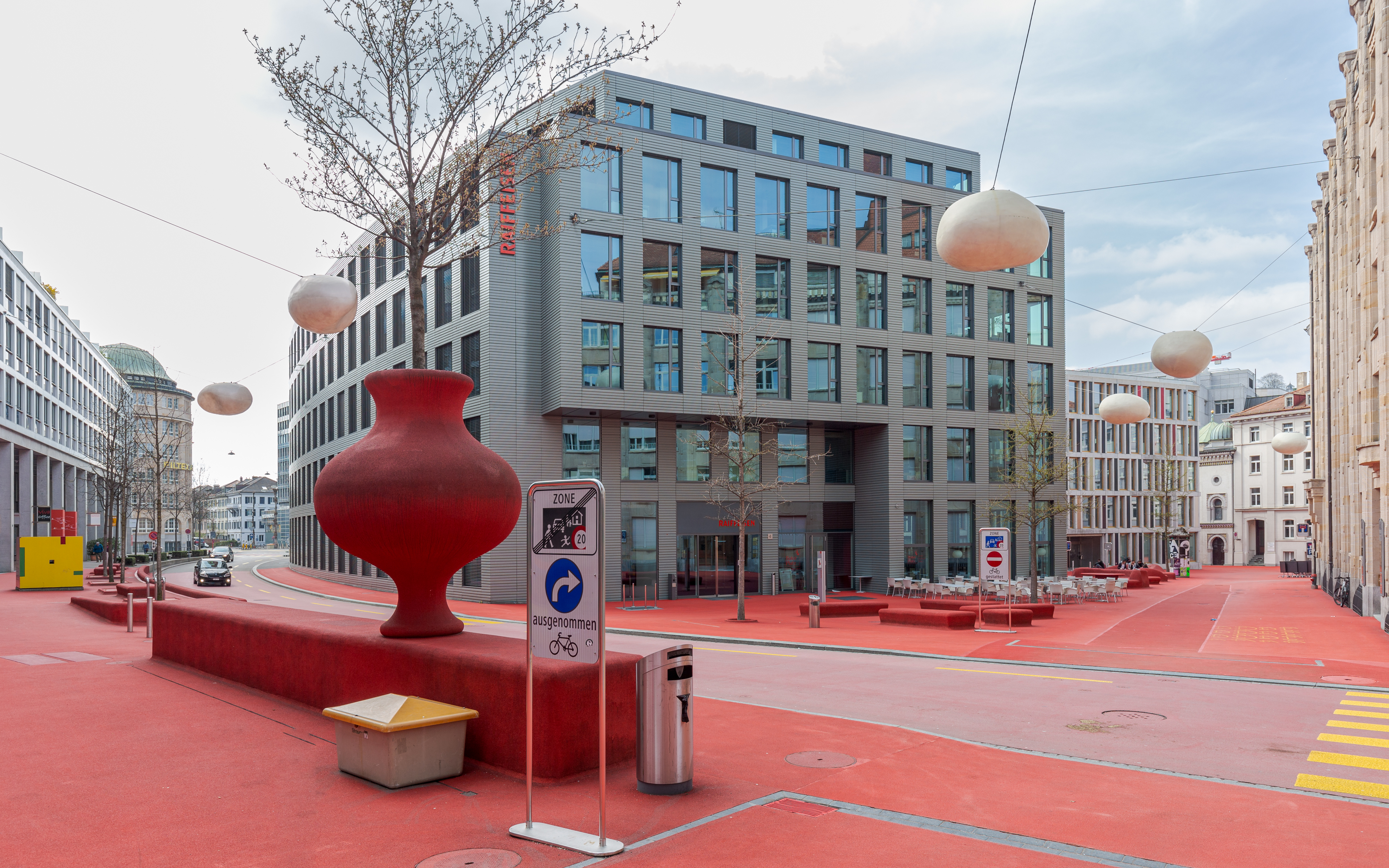
Raiffeisen national headquarters, St. Gallen

Raiffeisen Switzerland is a cooperative of cooperatives – the union of all independent Swiss Raiffeisen banks. It bears responsibility for the business policy and strategy within the Raiffeisen Group. The 219 independent Raiffeisen banks of Switzerland are organised as cooperatives. With 896 branch offices in total, they make up the densest branch network of any Swiss bank. After the acquisition of Credit Suisse by UBS, the Raiffeisen Group has become the second-largest banking group in Switzerland with client assets under management of 246.6 billion francs. Since June 2014, Raiffeisen has been classified as one of Switzerland's systemically important banks and must therefore meet special requirements in terms of capital. Raiffeisen Switzerland has 3.65 million clients in Switzerland, of whom approximately 1.9 million are cooperative members and thus co-owners of their regional Raiffeisen banks.

== Union organisation ==
The 246 legally independent Raiffeisen banks in Switzerland joined to form Raiffeisen Switzerland (formerly called the Swiss Union of Raiffeisen Banks). Like the participating Raiffeisen banks, Raiffeisen Switzerland is a cooperative. It coordinates the group's activities, creates the basic conditions for the business activity of the local Raiffeisen banks (such as IT, infrastructure and refinancing), and advises and supports them in all commercial matters. Furthermore, risk management and auditing also come under the remit of Raiffeisen Switzerland. Raiffeisen Switzerland runs directly managed branches in the urban regions of Basel, Bern, St. Gallen, Thalwil, Winterthur and Zurich, whereby these are not independent cooperatives. Raiffeisen Switzerland's headquarters have been unofficially located in St. Gallen since 1912, and were made the legal headquarters in 1936.

== History ==
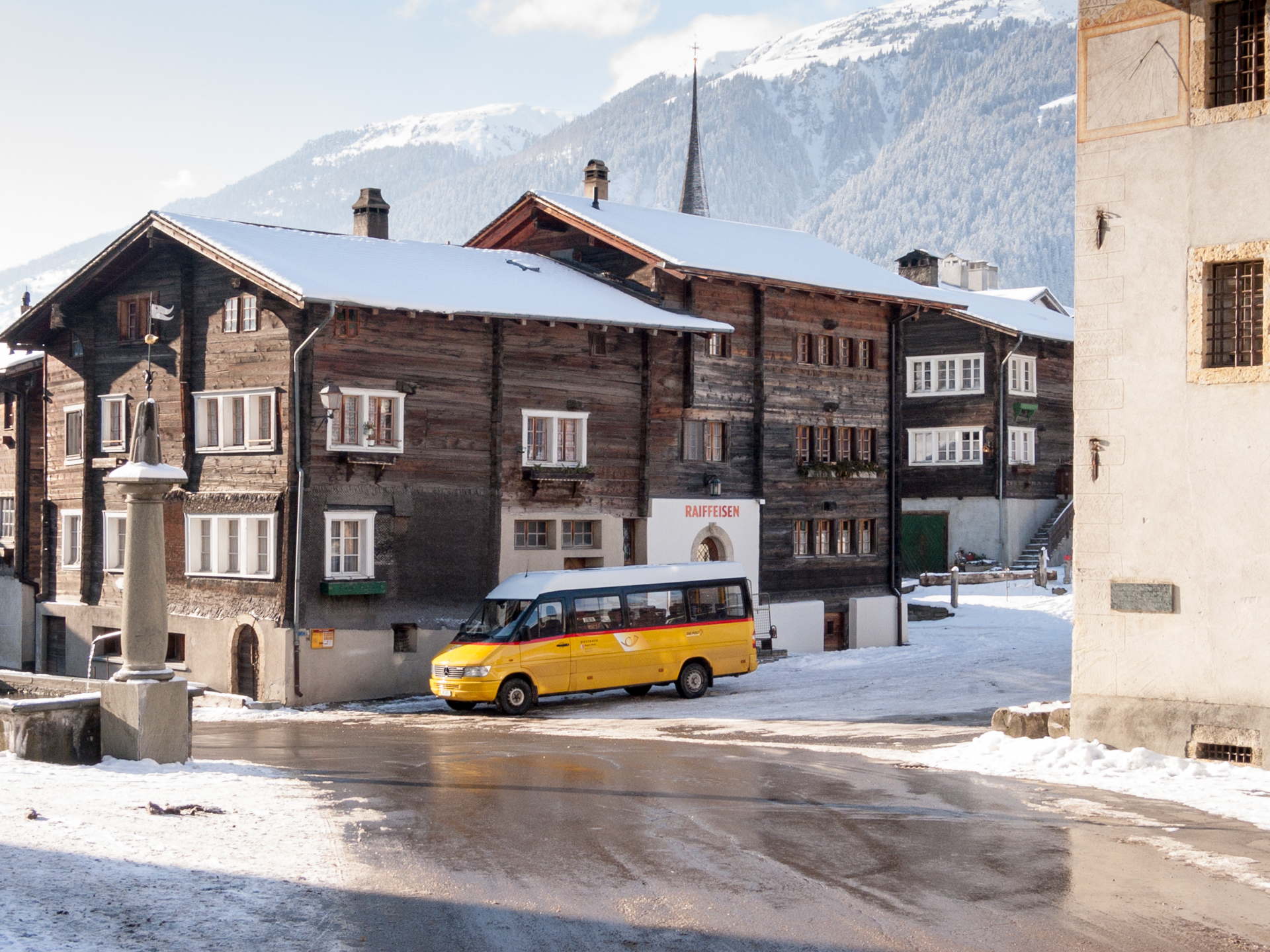
Village square of Ernen, Valais, with Raiffeisen bank office

The first cooperative banks were founded in Germany during the 1840s until the 1870s, upon the ideas and the initiative of Hermann Schulze-Delitzsch and Friedrich Wilhelm Raiffeisen, where farmers founded their own credit banks to finance seeds, machinery and wares. The idea of cooperative banks caught on in Europe, particularly in rural areas. The first Raiffeisen bank in Switzerland was founded on the initiative of parish priest Johann Traber in 1899, located in Bichelsee. In 1902, ten institutions founded the Swiss Raiffeisen union. From 1912 onwards, the union ran a collective office in St. Gallen, and this was expanded over the following 40 years by its director Josef Stadelmann. In 2018, Raiffeisen sold its private banking subsidiary, Notenstein La Roche, for around CHF 700 million to Vontobel.

=== Investigations ===
Proceedings by Finma

In 2017, the Swiss Financial Market Supervisory Authority (FINMA) launched enforcement proceedings against the banking group in relation to corporate governance issues, and against the former chairman of the executive board, Pierin Vincenz, for his handling of conflicts of interest while in office. Due to Vincenz's resignation as chairman of Helvetia Insurance and his pledge that he would no longer seek any positions of responsibility with banks or insurance companies, FINMA terminated the proceedings against Vincenz, while those against Raiffeisen Switzerland remained ongoing. After an eight-month investigation, FINMA concluded its enforcement proceedings against Raiffeisen in June 2018.

Embezzlement trial

In April 2022, Pierin Vincenz and Beat Stocker, chairman of Aduno – a credit card company owned by several Swiss banks, including Raiffeisen – were sentenced to 3 3/4 and 4 years of prison, and conditional fines of 280 times 3000 francs, and 160 times 3000 francs, respectively. According to the court, both Vincenz and Stocker caused financial damage to their companies with hidden personal investments in several firms, and later selling them to Raiffeisen and Aduno. Vincenz was also sentenced for charging Raiffeisen several private expenses, including visits at strip clubs, Tinder dates, and refurbishing a demolished hotel room.

== Commercial principles ==
Each regional bank provides services to customers of that region. By re-investing customer deposits within their area of operation, Raiffeisen banks contribute directly to the regional development. Furthermore, the Raiffeisen banks also support local associations and social institutions. They employ people who live in said region, and the taxes levied on the bank operations contribute to the local and regional tax income.

The Raiffeisen banks promote local roots and proximity to clients. Management responsibility at Raiffeisen is distributed in a federalist style. Furthermore, neither the regional Raiffeisen banks nor Raiffeisen Switzerland are pursuing growth at any cost. Risks and credits are monitored prudently.

Every Raiffeisenbank customer can buy up to 50 shares of their regional cooperative, each of which has a nominal value of 200 to 500 francs. Each year, the general assembly of the Raiffeisen cooperative determines the interest paid the shareholders. In 2020, it was usually between 3 and 4%.

Each Raiffeisen cooperative guarantees the assets of the other cooperatives, and Standard & Poor's gave Raiffeisen Switzerland an "A+" issuer credit rating. The government does not guarantee the assets, in contrast to most of the cantonal banks.

== Participations ==
Raiffeisen Switzerland cooperates with multiple firms to offer their services to the associated Raiffeisen banks. Raiffeisen Switzerland has direct participations in the following enterprises:

- Aduno group (credit cards and consumer credits), 25,5%
  - Viseca
  - Cashgate
- Leonteq, fintech-company, 29% (as of September 2020: 39.98%)
- Raiffeisen Unternehmerzentrum AG (Raiffeisen entrepreneur center), 100% (since 2014)
- Swiss Stock Exchange, 3,2%
- Swiss Bankers Prepaid Services (traveller's cheques and similar products), 16,5%
- ResponsAbility, a microfinance company active in developing countries, 15%
- KMU Capital AG, a mezzanine capital firm
- Twint, a Swiss mobile payment company, 5%

Following the departure of Vincenz, a critical appraisal of these participations was undertaken and, since then, a reduction of participations has been underway. Thus Notenstein Private Bank, which had been fully owned by the Raiffeisen group since 2012 and had been expanded through the takeover of the adjusted client base and the employees of La Roche private bank in 2015, was sold to Vontobel private bank for CHF 700 million in May 2018.

== See also ==
- List of European cooperative banks
- Banking in Switzerland

== Literature ==
- Sibylle Obrecht: Raiffeisen. Verlag Huber, Frauenfeld 2000, ISBN 3-7193-1185-6
- Andreas Zakostelsky, Friedrich Hagspiel (Hrsg.): Weißbuch Verbund. Überblick der Verbundstrukturen bei europäischen Genossenschaftsbanken. Wien 1999

== Links ==
- Raiffeisen Schweiz
- Sibylle Obrecht: In: Panorama Raiffeisen 3/2000 (PDF; 263 kB)
