= Hug von Watt =

St. Gallen merchant (c. 1385–1460/1461)

- Born: c. 1385; St. Gallen
- Died: 1460 or 1461; St. Gallen
- Occupations: Merchant; politician
- Spouse: Elisabeth Nostler
- Children: Hektor von Watt
- Father: Konrad von Watt

Hug von Watt (c. 1385 – 1460/1461) was a merchant from St. Gallen, a member of the von Watt family and one of the richest citizens of St. Gallen in the 15th century. Together with Peter von Watt and the Bernese Niklaus von Diesbach he founded the Diesbach-Watt Company. From 1436 to 1457 he was a member of the council of St. Gallen.

== Biography ==
Hug von Watt was born around 1385 in St. Gallen, the son of Konrad von Watt, a mayor (Bürgermeister). He married Elisabeth Nostler. His father Konrad was mayor in 1402 and fell in 1403 in the Battle of Vögelinsegg. Hug had two brothers, Hans (died 1458/1459) and Konrad (died 1469/1470).

An important merchant, Watt was a member of the Notenstein society (Gesellschaft zum Notenstein) and one of the richest citizens of St. Gallen in the 15th century. Together with Peter von Watt and the Bernese Niklaus von Diesbach he founded the Diesbach-Watt Company. He acquired the castle of Rebstein in 1418 and the castle of Steinach in 1432. In 1421 he and Peter von Watt took the linen measure (Leinwandmass), and with it the dues on traded linen, in pledge from the Abbey of St. Gallen. In 1429, with the abbot's consent, they sold it to the mayor and council of St. Gallen. He also acquired estates that remained in the family's possession for a long time. In 1430, together with his brothers Hans and Konrad and with Peter, he received a grant of arms (Wappenbrief) from King Sigismund.

From 1436 to 1457 Watt was a member of the council (Ratsherr). Among other offices, he was hospital administrator (Spitalpfleger) and Aussermeister, and wine assessor (Weinschätzer). He acted several times as a mediator, for example in 1439 in a dispute between Abbot Eglolf Blarer and Eberhard von Ramschwag. He died in St. Gallen in 1460 or 1461. His son Hektor was mayor of St. Gallen every third year from 1460 to 1474.

== Bibliography ==
- W. Näf, Die Familie von Watt, 1936, 17–29
- H. C. Peyer, Leinwandgewerbe und Fernhandel der Stadt St. Gallen von den Anfängen bis 1520, vol. 2, 1960, 48 f.
