= Hektor von Watt =

Mayor of St. Gallen (c. 1420–1474)

- Born: c. 1420; St. Gallen
- Died: 1474; St. Gallen
- Occupations: Merchant; politician
- Spouses: Katharina Bösch; Fides (surname unknown)
- Father: Hug von Watt

Hektor von Watt (c. 1420 – 1474) was a merchant and politician from St. Gallen, a member of the von Watt family. He acquired a large fortune, and from 1460 to 1474 he was, in a three-year rotation, mayor, former mayor and imperial bailiff of the city of St. Gallen.

== Biography ==
Hektor von Watt was born around 1420 in St. Gallen, the son of Hug von Watt. He married first Katharina Bösch and second Fides, whose surname is unknown.

Watt was a merchant and a member of the Notenstein society (Gesellschaft zu Notenstein). He acquired a large fortune, which suggests that he took part in trading business. From 1460 to 1474 he was, in a three-year rotation, mayor (Bürgermeister), former mayor (Altbürgermeister) and imperial bailiff (Reichsvogt) in the city of St. Gallen. He also served as one of the Seven (Siebner) and as a member of the board of examining magistrates (verhörrichterliches Kollegium). He died in St. Gallen in 1474.

His grandson of the same name was a merchant in the east and became a citizen of Kraków in 1510. The Kraków branch of the family, recorded until 1594, descends from him.

== Bibliography ==
- W. Näf, Die Familie von Watt, 1936, 35–37
