= Diesbach-Watt-Gesellschaft =

15th-century Swiss trading company

Diesbach-Watt Company
- Native name: Diesbach-Watt-Gesellschaft
- Type: Trading company
- Industry: International trade
- Founded: 1420
- Founder: Niklaus von Diesbach
- Defunct: 1460
- Headquarters: Bern, Old Swiss Confederacy
- Key people: Niklaus von Diesbach; Peter von Watt; Hug von Watt
- Products: Textiles, furs, metals, spices

The Diesbach-Watt-Gesellschaft was an international trading company active from 1420 to 1460, founded by the Bernese merchant Niklaus von Diesbach (c. 1375/1380–c. 1436). It was one of the most significant Swiss trading companies of the late Middle Ages, comparable in structure to the Great Ravensburg Trading Society, and operated within the economic sphere of Southern Germany, which had been experiencing significant growth since the 14th century.

== History ==
At the end of the Middle Ages, Switzerland north of the Alps belonged to the economic region of Southern Germany, which had been flourishing since the 14th century. In this context, international trading companies developed, the most important of which was the Great Ravensburg Trading Society. The Diesbach-Watt Company was the most similar Swiss counterpart to the Ravensburg company.

Niklaus von Diesbach partnered with brothers Peter and Hug von Watt to establish what became an early "multinational" enterprise. (Note: Sources disagree: the HDS article on the company calls Peter and Hug brothers, while the HDS article on Peter von Watt says his relationship to the rest of the family is uncertain; the sources sometimes call him Hug's cousin.) The von Watt brothers were prosperous merchants from St. Gallen, a center of linen production, and possessed an extensive client network in northeastern Europe, though they were less wealthy than Diesbach. Bern served as the company's headquarters until the late 1440s, while St. Gallen provided from the outset the company's most important commodity: linen cloth.

The company reached its peak in the 1440s. Beginning in 1445, it experienced growing losses, attributed to wars in Southern Germany and the Confederation. Disputes among partners further paralyzed the management of the enterprise. Following poor business results around 1460, the company was dissolved after at least three decades of operation.

== Trading activities ==
=== Textile trade ===
The textile trade formed the core of the company's activities. The company sold linen cloth in Geneva, southern France, and Spain, and also supplied ticking to Wrocław and Kraków. In the weaving cities of Germany (Ulm, Augsburg, Memmingen, and Biberach), it purchased fustian, which it delivered to Silesia and Poland. It exported felt hats from southern Germany to Barcelona. The company also participated in the trade of woolen cloth from England, Brabant, Northern Germany, and the Rhineland destined for Eastern Germany and Poland.

=== Fur trade ===
In return for its exports, the company purchased wax and furs in Silesia and Poland, notably marten, squirrel, rabbit, mink, and ermine pelts at the markets of Warsaw, Kraków, Wrocław, and Poznań, which it resold primarily in the cities of Southern Germany. The company also attempted to engage in trade of Polish cattle destined for Germany.

=== Other commodities ===
The company's product range included light metal goods, particularly brass from Nuremberg and copper from the mining towns of Upper Hungary, which were transported to Eastern Europe, Italy, and Spain. Woolen cloth from Como, as well as damask and velvet of Italian origin, were sold in Kraków. Gold thread and lazurite were transported via Barcelona to Catalonia and Aragon. Conversely, Spain primarily supplied saffron and other Mediterranean products: cotton, corals, dates, sugar, jams, malmsey, rose liqueur, cloves, ginger, cumin, nutmeg, cinnamon, pepper, incense, indigo, and ammonium chloride.

== Organization ==
The geographical extent of the company's field of activity was remarkable, even more than its product range, which corresponded to that of any trading company of the era. This vast radius of action required efficient communications, strategically located trading posts, targeted commercial strategy, new partners, and fresh capital in Bern, St. Gallen, and Nuremberg.

== Bibliography ==
- H. Ammann, Die Diesbach-Watt-Gesellschaft, 1928
- M. Körner, "La compagnie Diesbach-Watt entre 1420 et 1460", in 1291-1991, l'économie suisse, éd. R. Cicurel, 1991, 28-33
