= Altenklingen Castle =

Castle in Thurgau, Switzerland

Coordinates: 47°36′08″N 9°04′41″E

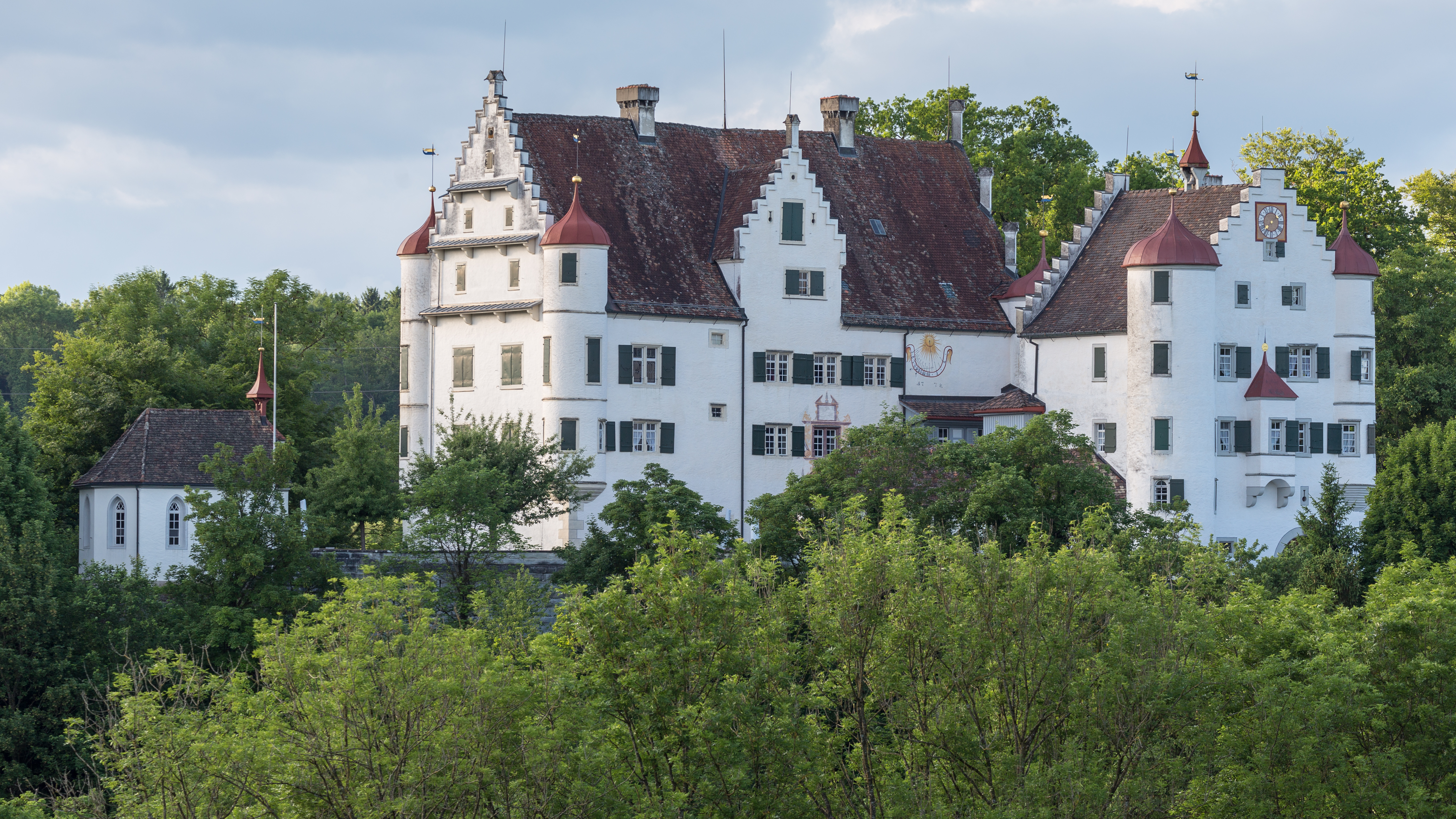
Altenklingen castle with Wiborada chapel

Altenklingen Castle is a castle in late Renaissance style in the Swiss Canton of Thurgau in the municipality of Wigoltingen.

It is a Swiss heritage site of national significance. Since 1595 the castle and the surrounding area is privately owned by the Zollikofer family.

== See also ==
- List of castles in Switzerland
