= Caspar Zyli =

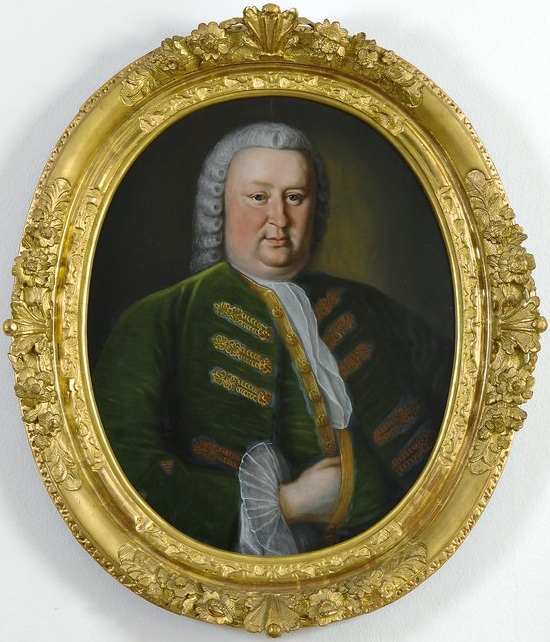
- Zyli c. 1750
- Born: Caspar Zili; 8 November 1717; St. Gallen, Switzerland
- Died: 15 August 1758 (aged 40); St. Gallen, Switzerland
- Other names: Caspar Zili
- Known for: Founding and leading original predecessor of Wegelin & Co
- Spouse: Susanna von Orelli (m. 1744)
- Children: 9

Caspar Zyli, also spelled Zili (8 November 1717 – 15 August 1778), was a Swiss merchant and banker who co-founded the predecessor of Wegelin & Co, which was Switzerland's oldest private bank until its dissolution.

== Life ==
Zyli was born 8 November 1717 in St. Gallen, to Hans Anton Zili (1677–1744), cloth merchant and carrier, and Maria Magdalena Zili (née Meyer). He had a total of fifteen siblings. His family was fairly affluent and belonged to the Notenstein Guild in St. Gallen.

== Literature ==
- Von der Speditionsfirma Caspar Zyli zum Bankhaus Wegelin & Co. St. Gallen, 1941 (in German)
