= Niklaus von Diesbach (merchant) =

Bernese merchant (died c. 1436)

- Born: Between 1375 and 1380
- Died: c. 1436
- Occupations: Goldsmith; merchant; banker; mining entrepreneur
- Spouses: Margareta Brüggler; Katharina du Ruz
- Children: Loy; Ludwig; Hans
- Relatives: Niklaus von Diesbach (grandson)

Niklaus von Diesbach (between 1375 and 1380 – c. 1436) was a goldsmith, linen merchant, banker and mining entrepreneur from Bern. He took part in founding the Diesbach-Watt-Gesellschaft, a trading company whose activities extended from Spain to Poland, and sat on the Small Council of Bern from 1422 to 1436. In 1434 Emperor Sigismund ennobled him. He was the progenitor of the noble Diesbach family.

== Biography ==
Niklaus von Diesbach was born between 1375 and 1380, the son of Rudolf. He is recorded as a burgher of Bern in 1412 and 1415. He married first Margareta Brüggler, daughter of Ludwig, a councillor in Bern, and then Katharina du Ruz of Fribourg. His second wife came from the upper circles of Fribourg's long-distance merchants.

Diesbach was a goldsmith, linen merchant and banker, and a mining entrepreneur in the Haslital. He is recorded as a merchant in Basel and Frankfurt in 1412 and as a goldsmith in Bern in 1414, and he was also active in Nuremberg, Fribourg and Geneva. He became a member of Bern's Council of Two Hundred in 1415 and sat on the Small Council from 1422 to 1436. Together with Hugo and Peter von Watt of St. Gallen, he took part in founding the Diesbach-Watt-Gesellschaft. The company traded mainly in linen and metal goods and had branches from Spain to Poland.

In 1427 Diesbach invested his large fortune in houses and land: Uttigen and parts of Kiesen, Oppligen and Stalden im Emmental. He also bought half of the lordship of Diessbach from Imer Bokess, as well as Holligen Castle. In 1434 Emperor Sigismund granted him a patent of nobility. He died around 1436.

Diesbach was the progenitor of the noble Diesbach family. His sons Loy (died 1451), Ludwig (died 1452) and Hans (died 1456) marked the family's transition from merchants to magistrates, and all three married into patrician families. Loy's wife, Klara von Büren, brought him the lordships of Signau and Worb; their son Niklaus acquired the other half of the lordship of Diessbach in 1469.

== Bibliography ==
- H. Ammann, Die Diesbach-Watt-Gesellschaft, 1928
- U. M. Zahnd, Die autobiographischen Aufzeichnungen Ludwig von Diesbachs, 1986, 131–133
- B. de Diesbach Belleroche, La maison de Diesbach, 2000

=== Archives ===
- Bern Historical Museum, Stammbuch (genealogy)
