= Peter von Watt =

Merchant from St. Gallen (died 1462)

- Born: Before 1400; St. Gallen
- Died: 30 April 1462; Nuremberg
- Occupation: Merchant
- Spouse: Ursula Pirkheimer

Peter von Watt (before 1400 – 30 April 1462) was a merchant from St. Gallen, a member of the von Watt family and a co-founder of the Diesbach-Watt Company. He moved to Nuremberg, where he acquired citizenship in 1428 and founded the Nuremberg branch of the family. From 1436 to 1462 he was a member of the Great Council of Nuremberg.

== Biography ==
Peter von Watt was born in St. Gallen before 1400. He married Ursula Pirkheimer, daughter of the merchant Lorenz Pirkheimer, from a leading merchant family of Nuremberg. Although the sources sometimes mention him as a cousin (Vetter) of Hug von Watt, it remains uncertain how Peter von Watt was related to the other members of the family. (Note: Sources disagree: the HDS article on the Diesbach-Watt Company calls Peter and Hug brothers, while the HDS article on Peter von Watt says his relationship to the rest of the family is uncertain.)

As the representative of a trading company, Watt was active in Breslau in 1418 and in Nuremberg in 1419. It is unclear whether this was already the Diesbach-Watt Company, which he founded together with Hug von Watt and the Bernese Niklaus von Diesbach. In 1421 he and Hug took the linen measure (Leinwandmass), and with it the dues on traded linen, in pledge from the Abbey of St. Gallen; in 1429, with the abbot's consent, they sold it to the mayor and council of St. Gallen.

Watt later moved to Nuremberg, where he acquired citizenship in 1428 and founded the Nuremberg branch of the family. In 1430 Peter, Hug and Hug's two brothers received a grant of arms (Wappenbrief) from King Sigismund. In Nuremberg Watt was a member of the Great Council (Grosser Rat) from 1436 to 1462. He died there on 30 April 1462. Descendants of the Nuremberg branch are recorded until the 1560s.

== Bibliography ==
- W. Näf, Die Familie von Watt, 1936, 38–45
- H. C. Peyer, Leinwandgewerbe und Fernhandel der Stadt St. Gallen von den Anfängen bis 1520, vol. 2, 1960, 4 f.
