= Georg Joachim Zollikofer =

Swiss-German theologian (1730–1788)

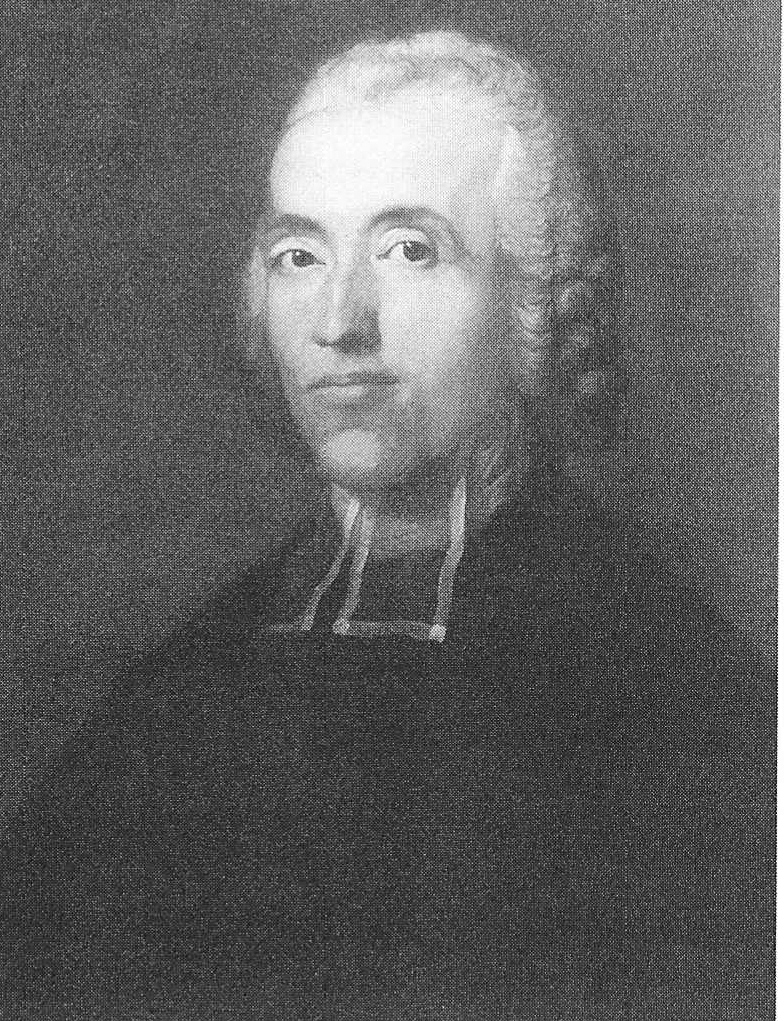
- Georg Joachim Zollikofer 1773. Portrait by Anton Graff
- Born: 5 August 1730; St. Gallen, Switzerland
- Died: 22 January 1788 (aged 57); Leipzig, Saxony, Germany
- Occupation: Theologian
- Known for: Hymns

Georg Joachim Zollikofer (5 August 1730 – 22 January 1788) was a Swiss-German theologian who popularized Enlightenment theology, and published several books of sermons and hymns.

== Life ==
Georg Joachim Zollikofer was born on 5 August 1730 in St. Gallen, Switzerland. His father, David Anthony Zollikofer, was a prominent lawyer. His mother was Anna Elisabeth Högger. He was educated at the St. Gallen gymnasium, then studied at Bremen and afterwards at the Utrecht University with a view to becoming a minister. After leaving university he was given a position as a preacher at Murten, Vaud in 1754. Soon after he was appointed to a larger church at Monsheim, Rheinhessen, and then to a church in Neu-Isenburg near Frankfurt am Main. In 1758 he became a Reformed Church preacher in Leipzig, Saxony.

Zollikofer became celebrated for his preaching, in which he popularized Enlightenment theology. He published several books. He corresponded with various writers and scholars of the late Enlightenment, including his friend Johann Kaspar Lavater. He edited Lavater's "secret diary" (2 volumes, 1771–73).

He married Susanna Regina Leroy in 1756. After she died he married Henrike Sechehaye, daughter of the businessman Isaac Sechehay of Leipzig, who was with him during the last seven years of his life. Both marriages were childless. He died in Leipzig on 22 January 1788.

== Works ==
Zollikofer's publications included:

- Georg Joachim Zollikofer. Über die Würde des Menschen und den Wert der vornehmsten Dinge die zur menschlichen Glückseligkeit gehören oder dazu gerechnet werden. Hildburghausen: Fischer.
- Georg Joachim Zollikofer (1783). Predigten über die Würde des Menschen. Vol. 1–2. Sermons on the dignity of man.
- Georg Joachim Zollikofer (1798–1804). Sämmtl. Predigten. Vol. 1–15. Sermons.
- Georg Joachim Zollikofer (1804). Briefwechsel zwischen Christian Garve und Georg Joachim Z. Correspondence between Christian Garve and Georg Joachim Z.

== Sources ==
- Raupp, Werner (2014-02-24). "Zollikofer, Georg Joachim". Historisches Lexikon der Schweiz.
- Tooke, William (1807). "A Sketch of the Author's Life". Sermons on the dignity of man: and the value of the objects principally relating to human happiness by Georg Joachim Zollikofer. Printed by Thomas & Sturtevant, for Isaiah Thomas, Jun.
