= House of Zollikofer von Altenklingen =

Swiss merchant family originally from Konstanz

Zollikofer Sollicoffre, Zollicofer, Zollicoffer
- Noble house
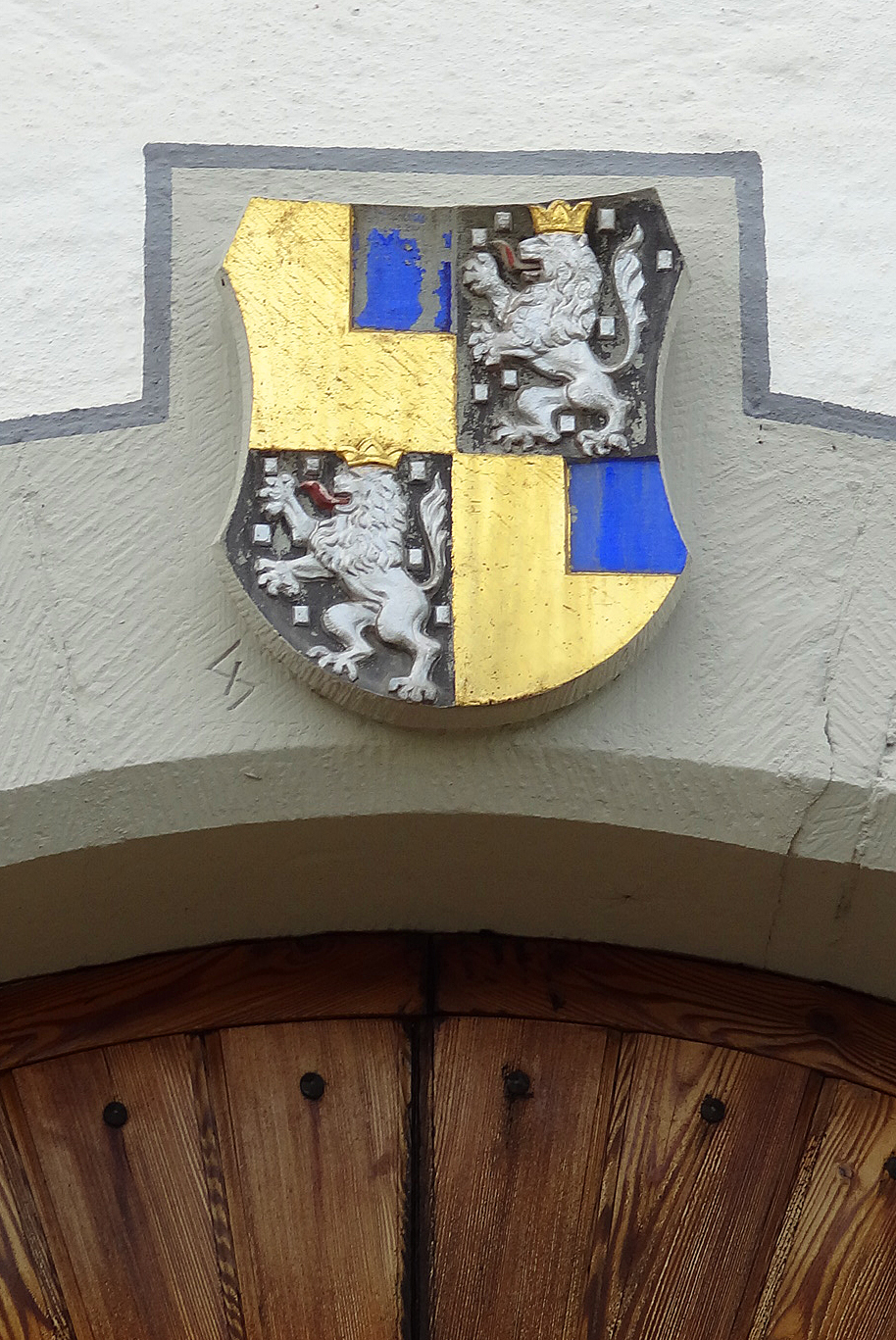
- Country: Switzerland
- Current region: Eastern Switzerland
- Origin: Konstanz, Holy Roman Empire
- Founded: 15th century
- Founder: Hans and Jobst Zollikofer
- Titles: Lord of Altenklingen; Noble of Holy Roman Empire; Noble of Denmark; Mayor (non hereditary)
- Estate: Altenklingen Castle
- Cadet branches: Black line (Nengensbergische), Red line (von Altenklingen, von Sonnenberg)

The Zollikofer von Altenklingen family is a Swiss patrician merchant family that originated from Konstanz, ennobled in the H.R.E. and became one of the leading Reformed families in Eastern Switzerland. Through their extensive trade networks, the Zollikofer accumulated significant wealth and rose to prominence in St. Gallen and the broader Swiss Confederation.

The family acquired Altenklingen Castle in 1585, which remains in their possession until today.

== History ==
=== Origins ===
In the first half of the 15th century, the brothers Hans and Jobst Zollikofer, both wealthy merchants, acquired citizenship of the city of St. Gallen. Jobst Zollikofer obtained a coat of arms charter from Emperor Frederick III in 1471. As early as the 15th century, the family maintained trade relationships with France and Spain.

The sons of Hans Zollikofer and Fida Vogel established what was likely the first Zollikofer trading company. Sebastian Zollikofer became the founder of the black line, while Ludwig Zollikofer established the red line of the family. Many family members belonged to the St. Gallen Society of Notenstein, an association of rentiers and wealthy merchants.

=== Nobility and territorial acquisitions ===
Among the St. Gallen merchants who achieved a prominent position in Lyon during the 16th century, the Zollikofer were among the most significant. Members of the black line acquired the estates and judicial lordships of Nengensberg (Engensberg) and Karrersholz near Steinach in 1591, thereafter calling themselves the Nengensbergische. In 1594, members of the Nengensbergische were ennobled by Emperor Rudolf II and received an improved coat of arms. Members of the red line had already acquired a patent of nobility along with an improved coat of arms from Emperor Rudolf II in 1578. Leonhart Zollikofer, grandson of Ludwig Zollikofer, purchased the Pfauenmoos estate near Berg in 1564 and acquired Altenklingen Castle and its judicial lordship in 1585. Thanks to the fideicommissum established in 1586, Altenklingen remained in family ownership until today. Within the red line, branches with the surnames von Altenklingen and von Sonnenberg can be distinguished, stemming from Leonhart Zollikofer and his brothers Laurenz, Georg, and Jost Zollikofer.

Marriage connections existed primarily with merchant families from St. Gallen such as the von Watt, Rietmann and Zili families, as well as with the Züblin family through the sisters Adriana Dorothea and Anna Margaretha Zollikofer. Connections were also made to other wealthy families such as the Escher through Lydia Zollikofer.

=== International expansion ===
As was typical for merchant families from the Swiss Confederation, representatives of the Zollikofer were documented from the early modern period not only in France, Spain, and Flanders, but also in Southeast Asia and Central and North America, serving both as merchants and in foreign military service. Hans Ludwig Zollikofer served Savoy, Sweden, and Denmark as a mercenary. Georg Heinrich Zollikofer von Altenklingen served in Dutch forces, while Gordian Zollikofer was deployed militarily in the Dutch East Indies (Indonesia).

In the 18th century, Zollikofer family members are documented as plantation managers in the Dutch colony of Berbice (Guyana). Robert Zollikofer managed the Altenklingen and Engelenburg plantations in 1740, whose names derived from Eastern Swiss properties. Members of St. Gallen merchant families returned from Berbice to Eastern Switzerland; Johanna Magdalena Züblin, born in Berbice and daughter of Paulus Züblin, married Hans Georg Zollikofer in 1774.

=== North American branch ===
Family members also emigrated to North America. Jacob Christoph Zollikofer settled in North Carolina and founded a new family branch. His son Georg Zollicofer fought as an officer in the American Revolutionary War and received land in Tennessee for his service. Georg's son Johannes Jacob Zollicofer settled there, and his son Felix Kirk Zollicoffer became a newspaper publisher, represented Tennessee in the United States House of Representatives, and fell in the American Civil War fighting for the Confederate States Army, for which a monument was erected in Nancy, Kentucky. The 1850 US Census documents seven members of the Zollikofer family as slaveholders.

Around 1930, numerous family members lived and worked in France, Germany, Belgium, North, Central, and South America, as well as in Southeast Asia, many of them as merchants.

== Political and Professional contributions ==
From the early modern period, numerous family members were active in politics and administration in Eastern Switzerland. Bartholomäus Zollikofer represented St. Gallen merchants at the French court. Joachim Zollikofer became mayor of the city of St. Gallen in 1613, as did Julius Hieronymus Zollikofer in 1783. Many family members served as chief bailiffs or administrators of the St. Gallen lordship of Bürglen, including Caspar Tobias Zollikofer von Altenklingen and Johann Georg Zollikofer von Altenklingen.

The Zollikofer family also produced clergy such as Georg Joachim Zollikofer and physicians such as Caspar Tobias Zollikofer. Johannes Zollikofer founded a printing press in St. Gallen in 1789, which from 1841 published the Tagblatt der Stadt St. Gallen und der Kantone St. Gallen, Appenzell und Thurgau. The family influenced newspaper publishing in Eastern Switzerland until the 20th century.

Julius Hieronymus Zollikofer served as a member of the cantonal government from 1803 to 1829, and Ludwig Arnold Zollikofer from 1873 to 1906. Caroline Zollikofer-Bayer opened the first toy and basketware shop in St. Gallen, which still existed in the 21st century under the name Zollibolli. The family particularly promoted education in St. Gallen. In 2002, the Sebastian, Sigmund and Jakob Zollikofer Foundation was established to support needy residents of St. Gallen, with preference given to members of the Ortsbürgergemeinde and descendants of the founders.

== Coat of arms ==
With the acquisition of the lordship of Altenklingen, the Zollikofer combined their own family coat of arms (in gold a blue quarter, heraldic left upper) with that of the Barons von Klingen – which had become extinct in 1395 – (a black shield scattered with silver billets and featuring an upright silver lion with a gold crown and red tongue).

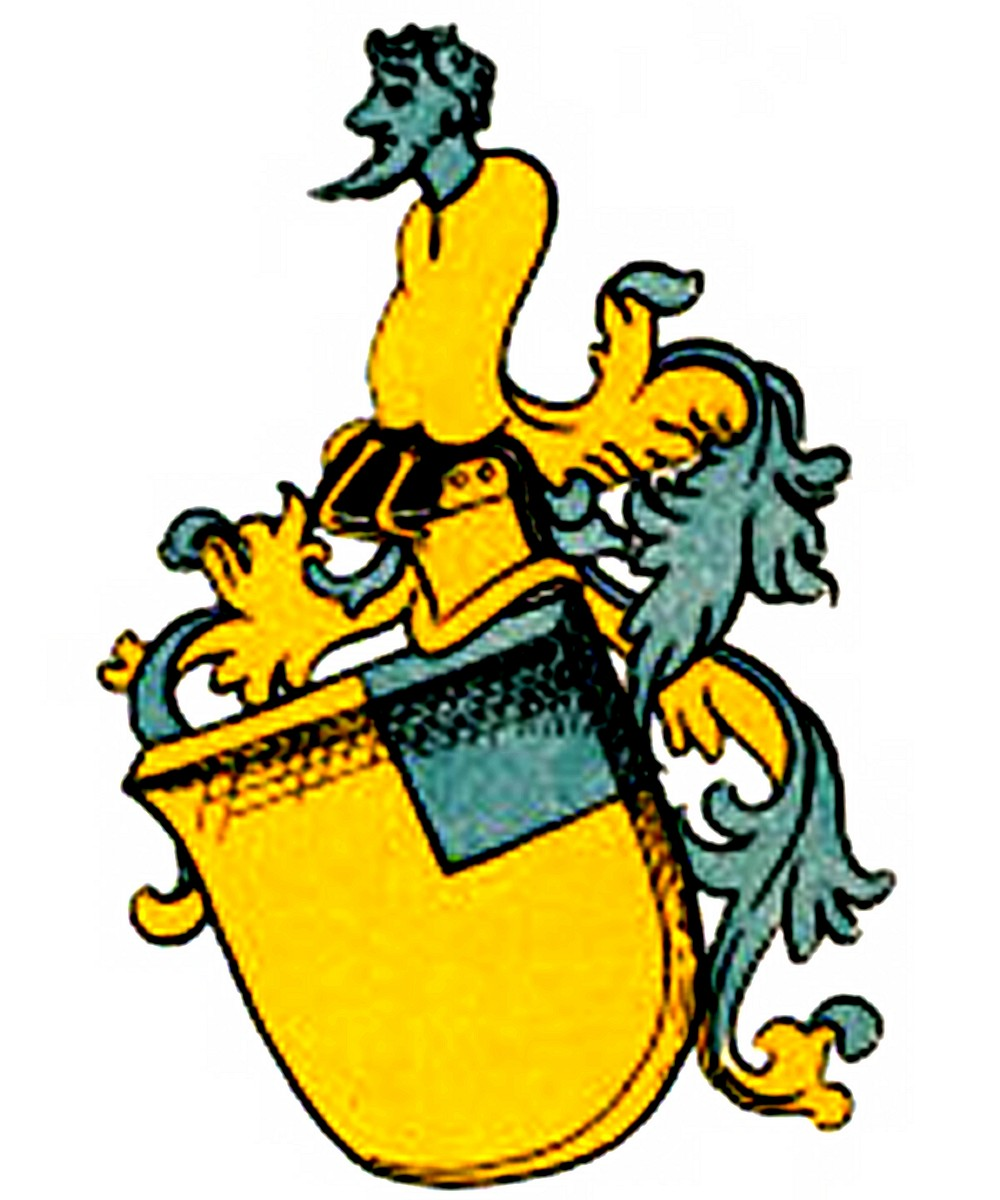
Coat of arms of the Zollikofer von Altenklingen from 1585

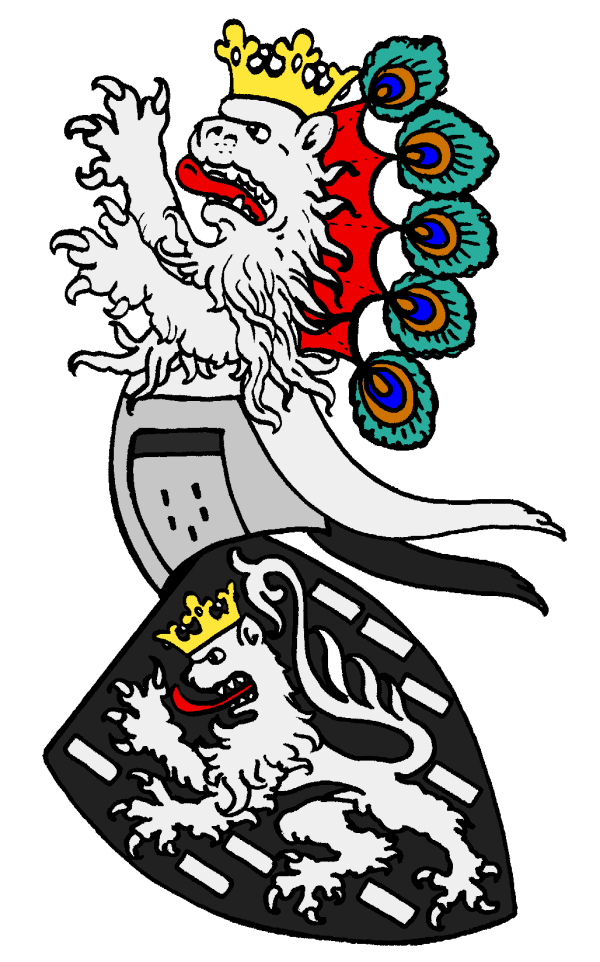
Coat of arms of the von Klingen

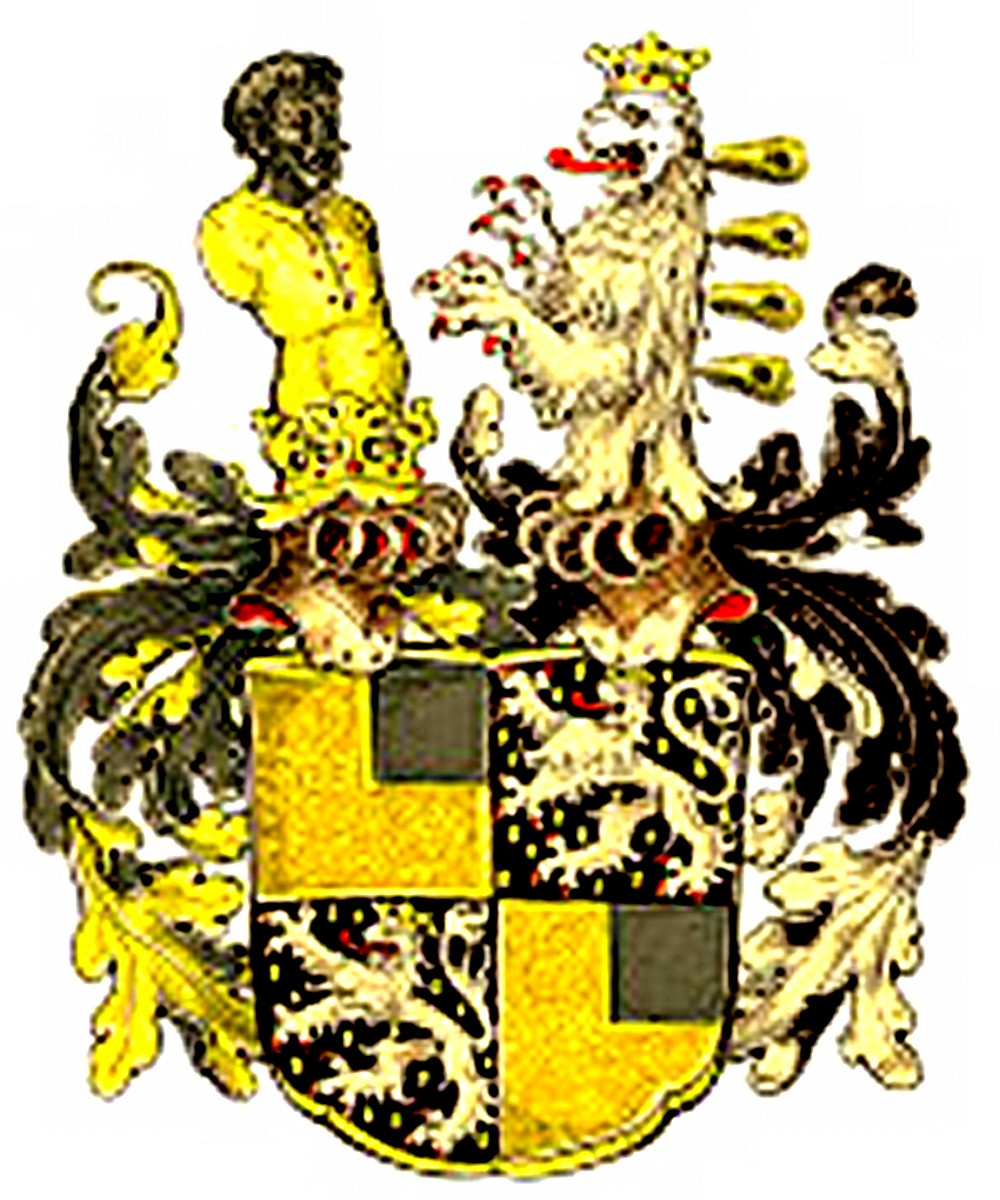
Coat of arms of the Zollikofer von Altenklingen from 1585

== Bibliography ==
- Götzinger, Ernst: Die Familie Zollikofer, 1887.
- Bürgerbuch der Stadt St. Gallen, 1930.
- Lüthy, Herbert: Die Tätigkeit der Schweizer Kaufleute und Gewerbetreibenden in Frankreich unter Ludwig XIV. und der Regentschaft, 1943.
- Lüthy, Herbert: La banque protestante en France de la révocation de l'édit de Nantes à la Révolution, 2 volumes, 1959-1961.
- Peyer, Hans Conrad: Leinwandgewerbe und Fernhandel der Stadt St. Gallen von den Anfängen bis 1520, 2 volumes, 1959-1960.
- Strehler, Hermann: Die Buchdruckerkunst im alten St. Gallen. Die Geschichte der Offizin Zollikofer. Vom «Wochenblatt» zum «St. Galler Tagblatt», 1967.
- Fässler, Hans: Reise in Schwarz-Weiss. Schweizer Ortstermine in Sachen Sklaverei, 2005.
- Kesselring-Zollikofer, Marie-Hélène; Zollikofer, Christoph L.: Das Fideikommiss der Zollikofer von Altenklingen, 2010.
