= Andreas Utermann =

British businessman (born 1966)

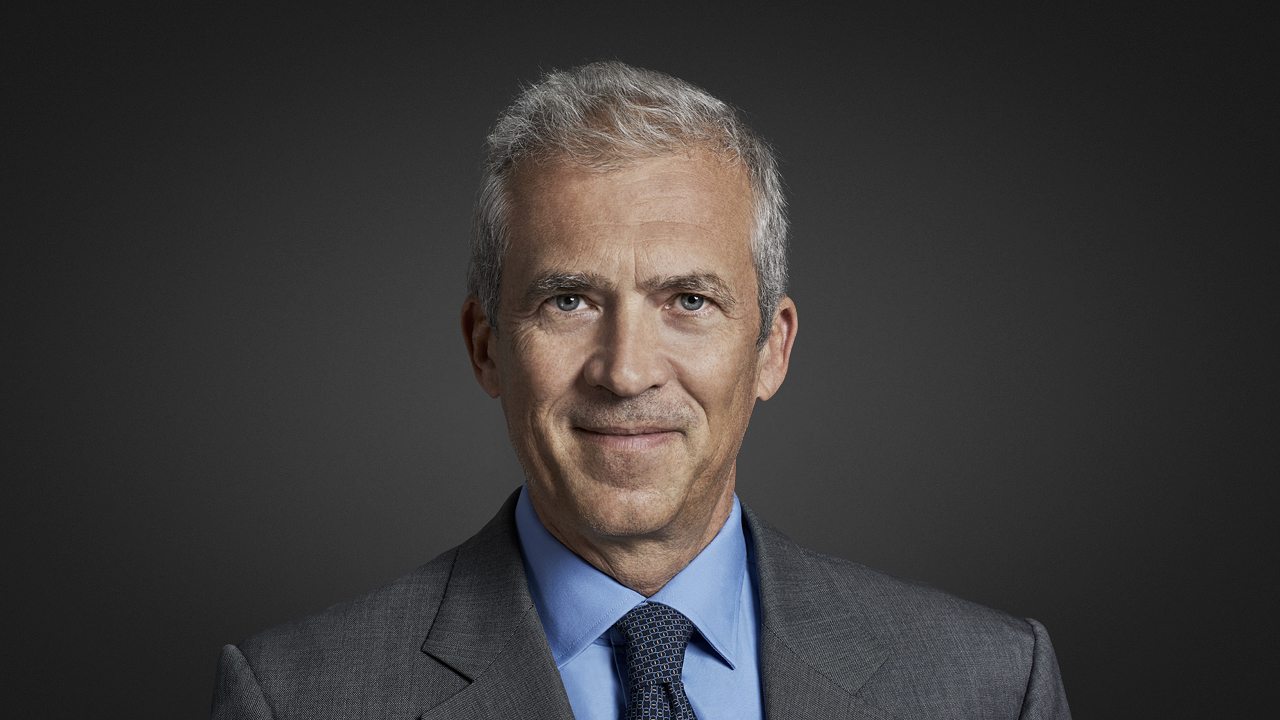
- Born: Andreas Ernst Ferdinand Utermann; 1966 (age 59–60); Brussels, Belgium
- Education: BSc; MA; MA degree in Economics
- Alma mater: European School of Brussels; London School of Economics; Catholic University of Leuven
- Occupations: Businessman, banking executive
- Known for: Leading Vontobel

Andreas Ernst Ferdinand Utermann commonly referred to as Andreas E.F. Utermann (born January 1966) is an Anglo-German businessman and banking executive. Utermann was appointed chairman of the board of directors of Vontobel Holding AG at the company’s AGM on 6 April 2022. Utermann led Allianz Global Investors, a global investment company owned by Allianz, for eight years from 2012, initially as a co-head and global chief investment officer and then as CEO from 2016.

== Early life and education ==
Andreas Utermann was born in Brussels to German parents and attended the European School of Brussels before moving to the UK to study at the London School of Economics, from which he graduated with a BSc degree in Economics in 1989. He subsequently obtained an MA degree in Economics at the Catholic University of Leuven, having agreed to defer his entry into S.G. Warburg's graduate programme for a year in order to do so. Utermann also holds the CFA's ASIP qualification.

== Career ==
Utermann joined Mercury Asset Management in 1989, becoming head of pan-European and subsequently global equities over the course of his 13 years there. He left Merrill Lynch Investment Managers (as Mercury became known a couple of years after its 1997 acquisition by Merrill Lynch) in 2002.

In 2002, Utermann joined Allianz to become its global CIO for equities. When Allianz's asset management division restructured in 2011, Utermann became Global CIO and co-head of Allianz Global Investors alongside Elizabeth Corley as CEO.

Utermann was sole CEO beginning in 2016, when Corley moved into a non-executive role within the firm. During his time in charge of Allianz Global Investors, Utermann expanded its investment offering further into bonds (for instance with the acquisition of Rogge Global Partners in early 2016) and creating a dedicated Alternative investments function. Utermann retired as CEO of AllianzGI on 31 December 2019 and served as advisor to the firm until June 2020.

In January 2020, Utermann was made a fellow of the CFA Society of the UK in recognition of his ‘exceptional service’ to the investment profession.

Utermann was elected as chairman of the board of directors of Vontobel Holding AG in April 2022, having been appointed to the Board as a Non-Executive Director in April 2021.

== Active investing ==
As CEO and Global CIO of Allianz Global Investors, Utermann was vocal on the subject of active investing in the asset management industry. Despite leading an active manager, he has acknowledged perception challenges facing the industry in light of cheaper passive investing alternatives such as ETFs. In 2014, Utermann wrote in the Financial Times that active investors needed to take concerted action to generate meaningful outperformance for clients and avoid becoming so-called closet trackers. In 2016, he wrote in the same paper about the perils of smart beta products. Writing of Utermann in IPE magazine in 2018, journalist Carlo Svaluto Moreolo wrote: "It would be hard to find a more passionate supporter of active management. However, he starts with the candid admission that the asset management industry has a reputational problem." He has argued for greater transparency across the investment value chain. More recently, he has advocated the greater use of performance fees, introducing new products and share classes where the fund manager is only rewarded for the additional value created. Since 2012, Utermann was the driver behind AllianzGI's aggressive expansion into Alternatives, in particular on the non-public market side.

== Sustainable investing ==
Utermann is known as a vocal proponent of the need for Diversity in Business and the Sustainable Investing Agenda. In January 2019 he was announced as one of the founding members of the New Climate Finance Leadership Initiative. In September 2019, as part of the Bloomberg Global Business Forum, Utermann announced that Allianz Global Investors was launching an Impact Fund that will invest directly into such projects. The Fund, Afrika Grow, was officially unveiled at the Afrika Summit in November 2019 in Berlin as a collaboration between the KFW and AllianzGI.

== Non-executive positions and awards ==
Utermann was elected to serve on the Board of SIX Swiss Exchange in April 2023. In addition, Utermann serves as Governor of Birkbeck, University of London, Governor of North London Collegiate School for Girls and is a founding trustee of the Financial Times Financial Literacy and Inclusion campaign.

Utermann held numerous non-executive positions during his career. These include membership of the board of the CFA UK, the International Capital Markets Association, the leadership council of TheCityUK and the advisory council of the DVFA.

Utermann was voted CIO of the year by Funds Europe in 2008.

== Personal ==
Utermann is married to Claudia Dorsch, an interior designer; they have three children. Utermann is a keen participant in a range of sporting activities and supports a number of charitable causes via the Utermann Charitable Trust, in particular those committed to helping address the world's pressing environmental issues as well as further education.

Utermann is a member of the Liberal Democrats, having joined the SDP in 1986 which later merged with the Liberals. He chaired the Hampstead branch of the Lib Dems during the 1990s.
