= Vontobel =

International investment management firm

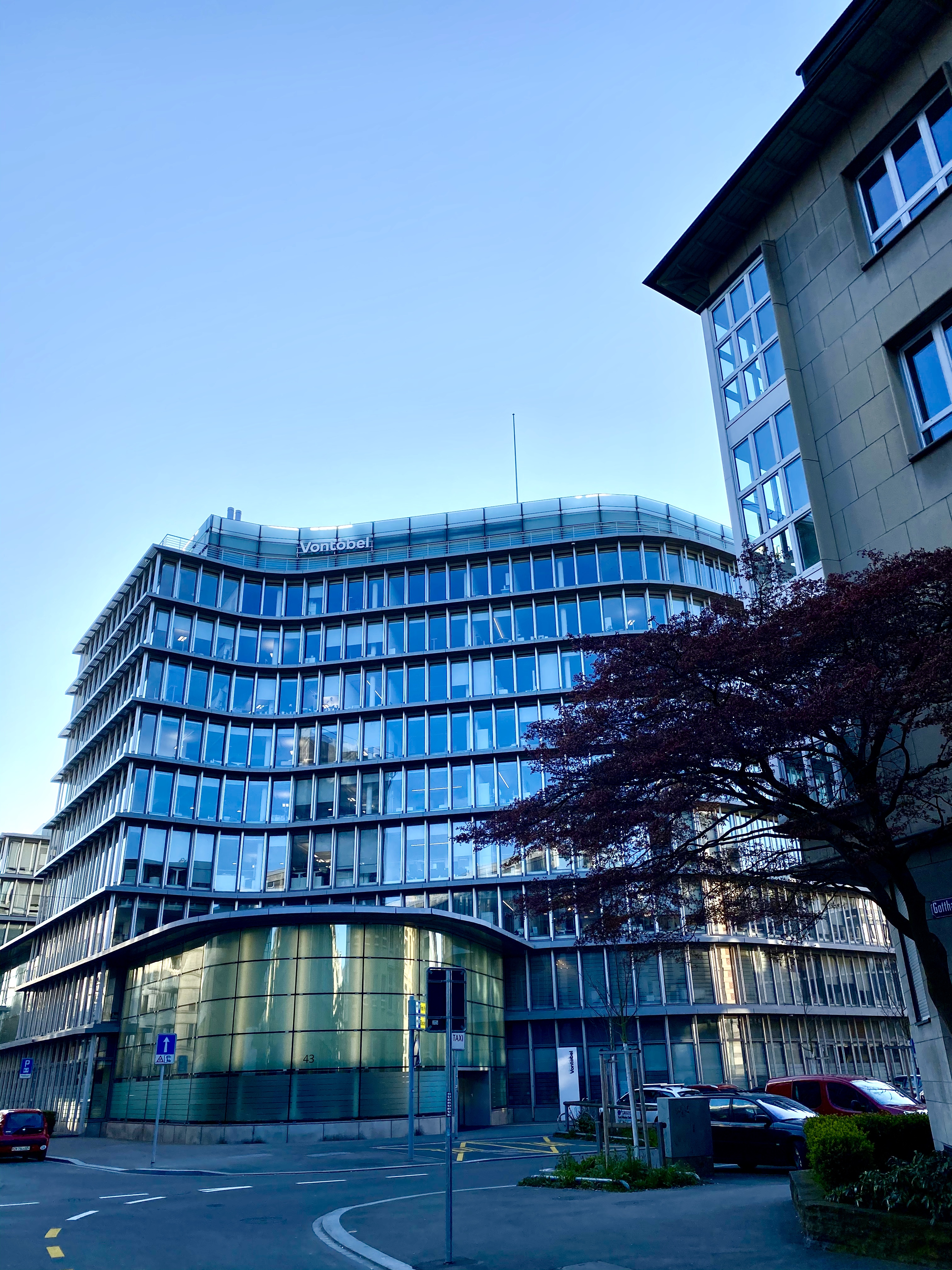
- Type: Public (Aktiengesellschaft)
- Traded as: SIX: VONN
- Industry: Financial services
- Founded: Zurich, Switzerland (1924)
- Headquarters: Zurich, Switzerland
- Number of locations: 27 (2025)
- Key people: Christel Rendu de Lint (Co-CEO); Georg Schubiger (Co-CEO); Andreas Utermann (Chairman)
- Services: Private Clients; Institutional Clients
- Operating income: ▲CHF 1,431.5 mn (31-12-25)
- Net income: ▲CHF 280 mn (31-12-25)
- AUM: ▼CHF 241 billion (31-12-25)
- Total assets: ▲CHF 34,737.4 mn (31-12-25)
- Number of employees: 2,310 (2025)
- Website: vontobel.com

Bank Vontobel is an international private bank and investment management firm with Swiss roots, providing private banking and investment services such as investment funds, structured products and segregated mandates to private and institutional clients. Headquartered in Zurich, Switzerland, the firm was founded as Haeberli & Cie in 1924 and is now present across 27 locations world-wide.

Vontobel Holding AG shares are listed on the SIX Swiss Exchange and majority owned by the founding family.

== Structure ==
Vontobel specializes in servicing Private Clients and Institutional Clients. It`s co-CEO's lead the asset management and wealth management divisions.

== History ==
Friedrich Emil Haeberli founded the brokerage firm Haeberli & Cie 1924. After Haeberli's death Jakob Vontobel took over the brokerage firm 1936 and established the limited partnership J. Vontobel & Co. The son of Jakob Vontobel, Dr. Hans Vontobel (1916–2016), joined the bank 1943. Jakob Vontobel's grandson, Hans-Dieter Vontobel, started working for the bank in 1972.

The Bank J. Vontobel & Co. was transformed into a limited liability company in 1983. Vontobel Holding AG was listed on the Swiss Stock Exchange in 1986, the introduction of the standard registered share followed in 2001.

In 1984, Vontobel expanded into the US and founded Vontobel USA Inc. Other locations abroad followed later. Raiffeisen Switzerland acquired a 12.5 percent stake in Vontobel Holding AG in 2004. The Vontobel family and the charitable Vontobel Foundation retained the majority of the share capital. In 2016 Vontobel strengthened its collaboration with Raiffeisen acquiring former Raiffeisen subsidiary Vescore AG. In 2009 Vontobel took over the Commerzbank (Schweiz) AG in Zurich.

Vontobel acquired a majority stake in TwentyFour Asset Management LLP in London, completed in 2021, when Vontobel acquired the remaining 40%. In the same year Bank Finter was purchased, this was followed in 2018 by the takeover of Notenstein La Roche from Raiffeisen Switzerland and in 2022 by the acquisition of the UBS Swiss Financial Advisers. The acquisition of a significant minority stake in the private infrastructure manager Ancala Partners LLP, London, marks a milestone in delivering on the firm's strategy to enter private markets.

== Legal and regulatory matters ==
In February 2001 Vontobel cancelled y-o-u, a planned internet bank, after spending more than CHF 150 million on the project. The following month company dismissed three senior employees over the affair: the board chairman Jörg Fischer, the chief financial officer Walter Kaeser, and the head of corporate finance Hans-Peter Bachmann. Vontobel stated that they had neglected their responsibilities, and Hans-Dieter Vontobel resumed the chairmanship. The total cost was later calculated at more than CHF 250 million.

In December 2009 Fischer and Bachmann went on trial at the Zürich District Court over a capital increase carried out in 2000 at the investment company Private Equity Holding, in which Bank Vontobel had bought 750,000 undersubscribed shares. Prosecutors sought prison terms and the recovery of about CHF 131 million from the bank. In January 2010 the court acquitted both men on all counts and dismissed the application to recover assets from the bank. Vontobel is also among numerous banks facing clawback claims from the liquidators of feeder funds connected to the fraud of Bernard Madoff, a matter it has listed as unresolved in its annual reports.

In 2014 the former Bayern Munich president Uli Hoeness was convicted of tax evasion in Germany over an undeclared account held at Vontobel. In February 2018 the bank paid about €13.3 million to settle an investigation by the German state of North Rhine-Westphalia into untaxed assets held by German clients, under an agreement applying across all German states. It concluded discussions with the United States Department of Justice under that country's programme for Swiss banks without paying a penalty.

Vontobel was later drawn into a cross-border dispute between the Japanese company J Trust and the Thai-listed lender Group Lease, a Vontobel client. In 2019 the Zürich public prosecutor opened a money-laundering investigation into Group Lease's former chief executive, and at the end of 2020 the Swiss Financial Market Supervisory Authority (FINMA) opened enforcement proceedings against Vontobel, which FINMA did not confirm. In April 2022 J Trust sought up to CHF 214 million from the bank in debt-collection proceedings, which Vontobel contested. As of 2022 no misconduct by the bank had been established.

== Shareholder structure ==
The majority of the share capital is held by the Vontobel family and the Vontobel Foundation in the form of a pooling agreement. Two fourth-generation family members are represented on the Vontobel Board of Directors.

== See also ==
- Twentyfour Income Fund, a large investment fund managed by Vontobel
