= House of Rietmann =

Swiss family

Rietmann
- Noble house
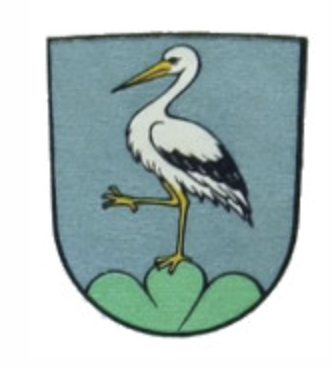
- Country: Switzerland, Italy
- Origin: Bischofszell
- Founded: XIII
- Founder: Burkard Rietmann
- Titles: Mayor (non hereditary); Imperial Baliff (non hereditary); Guild Master (non hereditary); Imperial Count Palatine (non hereditary); Patrician of Bischofszell; Patrician of St. Gallen; Patrician of Schaffhausen; Patrician of Zurich; Noble
- Cadet branches: Rietmann of St. Gallen; Rietmann of Milan; Rietmann of Schaffhausen; Rietmann of Zurich; Rietmann of Basel

The House of Rietmann (or von Rietmann) is an ancient reformed ruling patrician Swiss family, with its earliest records dating back to the 13th century and most likely originating in Bischofszell, in the Canton of Thurgau. Over the centuries, its various branches established themselves in numerous Swiss cities, including Zurich, St. Gallen, Schaffhausen, and Basel.

As long-standing burghers holding civic rights across these cities, the family formed part of the local patriciate, numbering merchants, military officers, public officials, and prominent guild members among its ranks. From the 19th century onward, various members emigrated abroad, settling in centers such as Milan and reaching as far as New Zealand.

== Origins and Spread ==
Although citizenship (naturalization) in Bischofszell is documented as early as 1417 (the year Hans Rietmann is recorded as a town councillor), the family originally traces its roots to the Zihlschlacht area, where as early as 1387 chronicles mention the Rietmann siblings in Vorderegg, even though the earliest verified reference to the surname dates to 1296 with a Burkard Rietmann in Zurich records. Between the 14th and 15th centuries, several members of the Rietmann family are cited in the region between Bischofszell and Wattwil, bound by oaths to the Counts of Toggenburg.

In subsequent centuries, members of the family moved from Bischofszell toward Zurich, Schaffhausen, and Basel, and later to St. Gallen, where the house would reach its peak of political and economic prestige.

=== The Ancestral Branch of Bischofszell ===
Parallel to this geographical dispersal, a branch of the family maintained a firm presence in Bischofszell, becoming deeply rooted in its civic institutions. Between the 16th and 18th centuries, various members held prominent administrative and judicial posts, such as city treasurers (Seckelmeister), town clerks (Stadtschreiber), judges, and town councillors (Ratsherr or Altrat), including Bartolome (b. c. 1567), Melchior (b. c. 1560), and Benjamin Rietmann (1640–1723). Another notable member, also named Benjamin (c. 1570–1629), represented the Town Council before the Federal Diet (Tagsatzung) in 1585 during the Zwinger dispute (Zwingerhandel).

Of particular significance in Bischofszell was the near-generational tenure of the office of Spitalmeister (Master of the Hospital), a key role in managing civic finances and properties, held in succession by four members of the family: Jakob (in office 1568–1574), Heinrich (1580–1662), Hermann (1604–1663), and Heinrich Rietmann (1635–1687). Alongside their local political influence, this branch achieved considerable economic prosperity by developing commercial and financial networks in Lyons and Amsterdam.

== Branches ==
=== St. Gallen Branch ===
Flag of Canton of Sankt Gallen

==== Origins ====
The branch destined to become the most influential was that of St. Gallen. Around the year 1420, the Rietmanns moved from Rorschach to the city-republic. Initially they were closely tied to the Abbey of St. Gallen, they served the Prince Abbot as councillors, treasurers, bailiffs and received numerous fiefs. Later, the family obtained citizenship in 1499 through Hans Rietmann, formerly the bailiff (Vogt) of Rorschach Castle. This lineage became known as the Vogt line. A second branch from Bischofszell (citizens at least since 1420), known as Kudermann, was naturalized in 1538 and went extinct in 1837.

The family's activities prior to their relocation to St. Gallen are not entirely clear; however, there are mentions of the family in the area already in 1364 and as early as the 1421 several members are recorded as citizens of Bischofszell with rights over ecclesiastical estates and tithes. An Ulrich (Üli) Rietmann was an Imperial Count Palatine under Abbot Ulrich VIII, and in 1421 was enfeoffed by the Abbot of St. Gallen with lands and revenues in Nieder-Arnegg.

In 1467, the brothers Hans and Üli Rietmann, sons of the late Üli, received properties and tithes in Nieder-Arnegg and Hüttenwil. Previously, in 1440 Hans already appeared as the owner of estates in Begginen. Meanwhile, in 1470 Ulrich is recorderd in the Oath of the Councilors as a member of the Council of the Prince-Abbey of St. Gallen serving the great Abbot Ulrich Rösch and alongside high-ranking figures such as the Dean Konrad von Berneck and the Hofammann Rudolf von Steinach.

==== Establishment ====
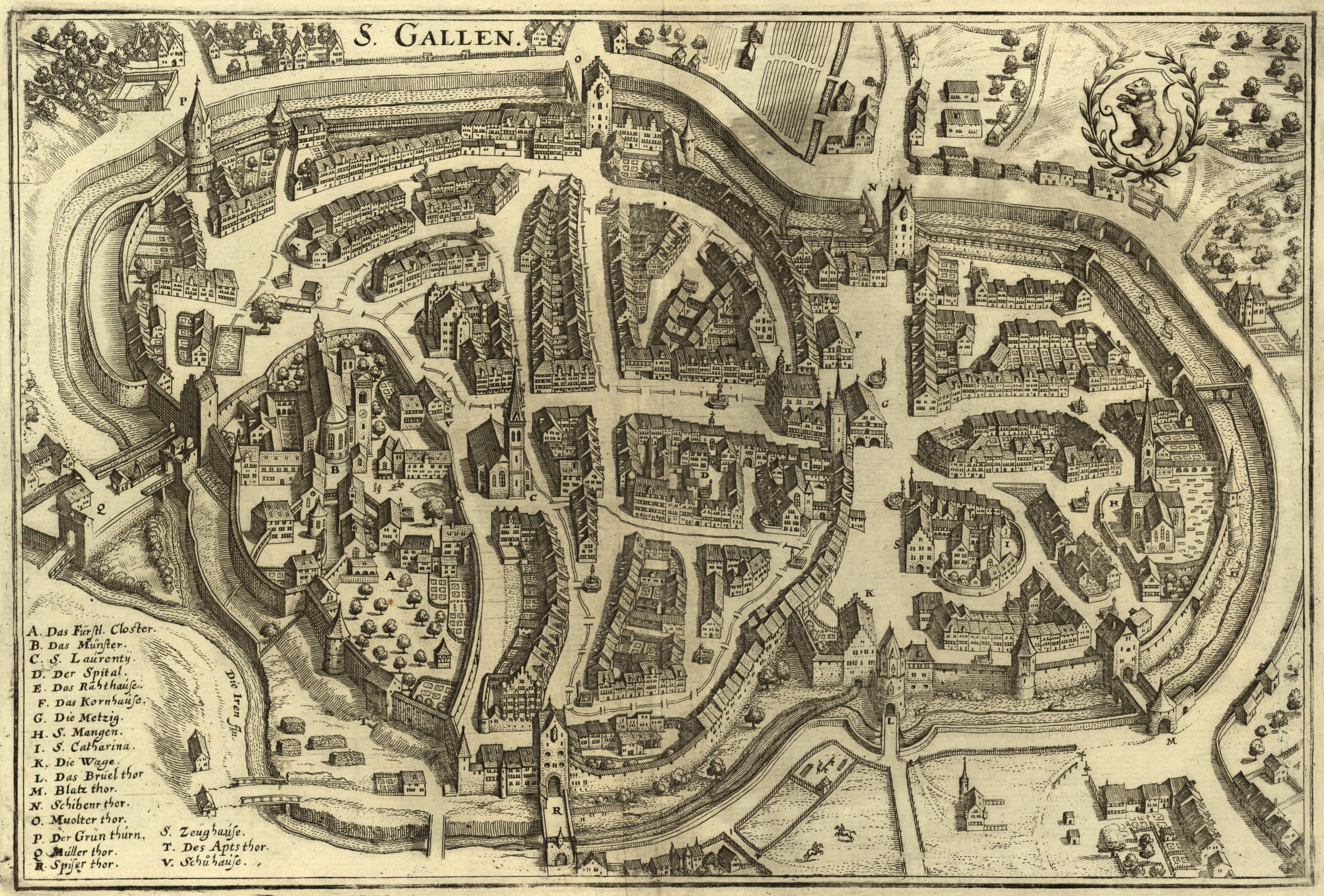
Map of St Gallen (1654)

Once established in St. Gallen, between the 16th and 19th centuries, the Rietmanns continued serving the Abbot of St. Gallen and receiving fiefs however the main scope of the family changed. The Rietmanns became one of the city's ruling families, systematically holding offices at every level of the municipal government, military and local judiciary. Numerous members served as public officials, Vogts, merchants, and guild masters (Zunftmeister), particularly within the butchers' guild, but also in those of the blacksmiths and weavers. This allowed the family to maintain a nearly continuous presence over the centuries in the prestigious Notenstein Society, an association of the most influential and wealthy families, and the Small Council (Kleiner Rat), the city's most important governing body. St. Gallen was organised under a guild-based system in which the guilds assumed a primary political role, and the guild masters represented the majority of the Council members. On several occasions, the family succeeded being bestowed honorary weapons and securing the positions of Standard-bearer, Vice-Mayor and Mayor (Bürgermeister), the highest office in the city.

==== Religious, Military, Civic, and Economic Contributions ====
In 1509, Heinrich Rietmann is recorded as one of the four survivors of the 1495 mercenary expedition to Naples in the service of Charles VIII. This expedition involved 121 St. Gallen citizens led by Captain Kaspar Gnäpser.

The family played an active role in the Protestant Reformation in Eastern Switzerland through its members serving in the Reformed clergy, the city magistracies, and the militias. In June 1529, during the tensions preceding the Second War of Kappel, Heinrich Rietmann (known as Vogt) led a detachment of 105 militiamen sent by the St. Gallen Council to the Rhine border. Shortly thereafter, he took command of a 24-man garrison stationed to protect the city's abbey.

This commitment to the city's welfare continued in various forms over the following centuries. Michael Rietmann (1647–1726) became a benefactor of the city's education system by funding local schools, while his grandson of the same name, Michael Rietmann (1782–1862), distinguished himself by promoting the scientific management of communal forests. By the late 19th century, the family's impact shifted toward finance and infrastructure; Georg Karl Rietmann-Gruebler (1843–1899) was a co-founder of Schweizerische Unionbank of St. Gallen (later merged into the Swiss Bank Corporation in 1896, now known as UBS). Appointed to the commercial board in 1888 (becoming its vice-president in 1895) and serving as vice-president of the bank from 1891. Rietmann was also a key advocate for the construction of the Mühlegg funicular.

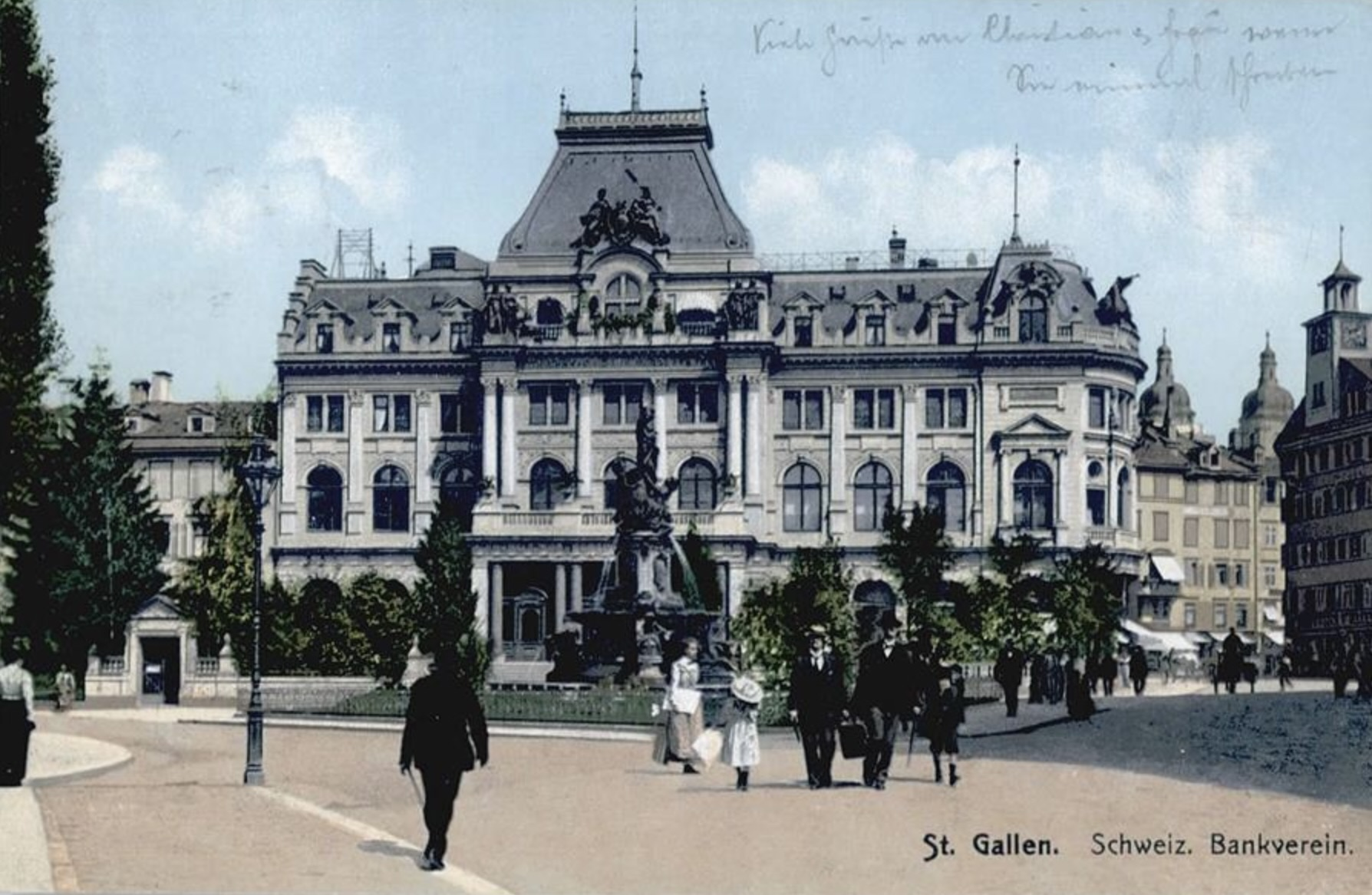
Schweizerischen Unionbank of St. Gallen (1910)

==== Cultural and Artistic Legacy ====
Beyond politics and commerce, the Rietmanns left a significant mark on the cultural and social fabric of Switzerland. The spiritual and literary life of the region was shaped by the pastor and writer Johann Jakob Rietmann-Brändli (1815–1867), while the field of physical education was influenced by Jakob Arnold Rietmann (1846–1906). A goldsmith by trade, Jakob Arnold became nationally renowned as a gymnastics instructor for the influential exercise routines he composed.

The family also contributed to the hospitality industry, managing various local inns and hotels. Their visual legacy remains highly relevant today through the works of two notable artists: Johann Jakob Rietmann (1808–1868), a landscape painter and draftsman, and Otto Rietmann (1856–1942), a photographer whose documentation of the era is of lasting historical value.

==== International Expansion ====
In the 19th century, some branches moved beyond Swiss borders: commercial operators established offices in Galați (Romania), others settled in Milan, while travelers such as Otmar Laurenz Rietmann (1831–1869) reached Australia and New Zealand. Despite this dispersion, the surname remains deeply intertwined with the economic and political history of St. Gallen.

==== Milan Branch ====
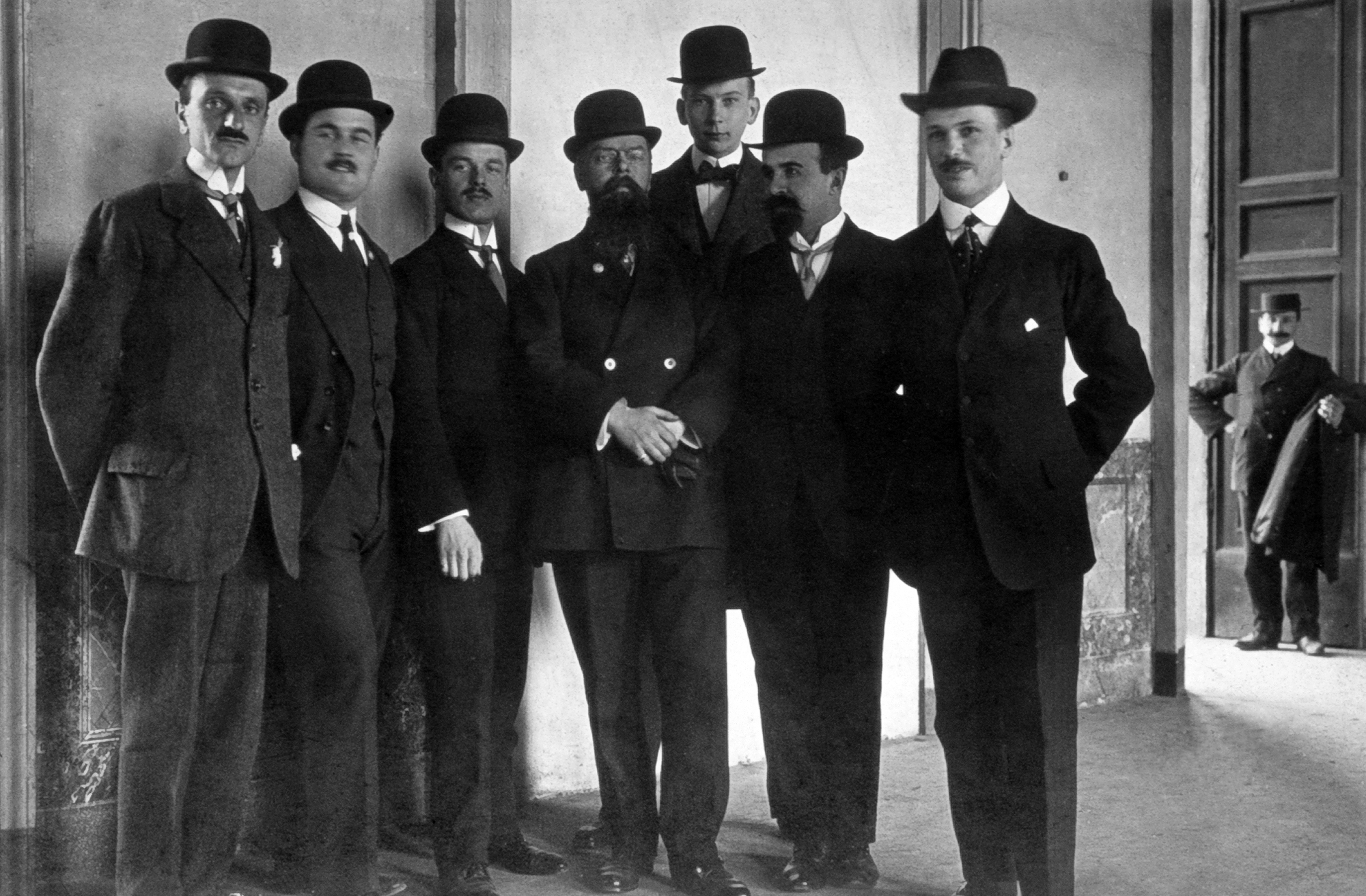
Some of Inter's founders and managers; from left: Giovanni Paramithiotti (president), Giorgio Muggiani, Hugo Rietmann, Hirzel, Bach, Luigi Ansbacher, Glockner and, at the door on the right, Max Rietmann.

From the line that settled in Milan descended Hugo Eugen Rietmann, a textile entrepreneur and prominent figure in the early days of Italian football. Having moved to the Lombard capital in his youth and naturalized as Italian in 1920, he took part (as did his brother Max and sister Alice) on 9 March 1908 in the meeting at the Ristorante L’Orologio that led to the founding of the Foot-Ball Club Internazionale, where he also played as a midfielder during the 1909 season. After his playing career, he became a federal referee; in 1911 he contributed to the establishment of the Italian Referees’ Association (A.I.A.), with which he remained involved as a director for three decades, and refereed the Italian Top Division from 1911 to 1920. Most notably he refereed the Coppa Beretta-Rietmann in 1913, which Inter FC won, and served on Italy's National team Technical Commission. At the same time, he managed a fine fabric and textile business located in Piazza della Scala N.4, maintaining trade ties with Switzerland and helping introduce St. Gallen textile techniques into Lombardy's industry. In 1948, the FIGC awarded him the title of “Pioneer of Italian Football”. He married Eva Rossi, with whom he had two sons, Giorgio and Aldo, who took over and continued the family business.

Of the two sons, Cav. Giorgio, Knight of the Order of Merit of the Italian Republic, served as an ambassador for Inter in the 1960s and 1970s, carrying on the connection with the club founded by his father. Aldo had two children: the journalist Raffaella and Ugo. Hugo's grandson, Ugo, inherited his entrepreneurial spirit, establishing himself as an executive and CEO of various Italian and international companies, including Philips, Telecom Italia and Athena 2000 (Fininvest Group). In 1999 he was among the founding partners, COO and members of the Board of Fastweb. He currently serves as senior partner at the corporate consultancy ERA Group – Europe. He married Countess Elena Bonzi, of the Counts Bonzi, with whom he had two sons: Nob. Alessandro and Nob. Cav. Federico.

=== Zurich Branch ===
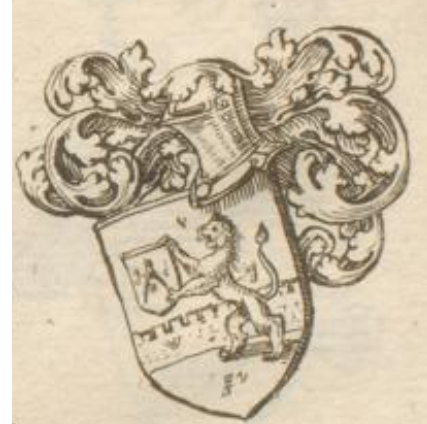
Rietmann coat of arms from Zurich

The Zurich branch originated through naturalization from Bischofszell between 1422 and 1434. They were part of the Watermen's Guild and the prestigious Böcken Society (one of the three aristocratic societies of Zurich). This line became extinct on March 28, 1723.

=== Schaffhausen Branch ===
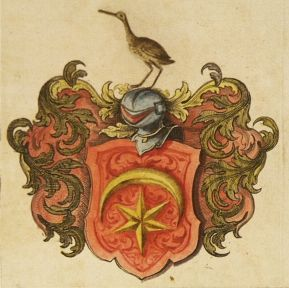
Rietmann coat of arms from Schaffhausen

The Rietmanns are recorded in Schaffhausen as early as 1392, when the family appears in the city's first tax register. In 1575, a Johann Georg Rietmann formally obtained Burgerrecht (citizenship rights), securing their place within the Schaffhausen urban patriciate. Indeed, the family was part of the prestigious Merchants Guild.

Among its notable figures was Johannes Rietmann, who pursued a military career that culminated in his appointment as Field Marshal (the Ancien regime equivalent of a modern-day General) in the service of the House of Savoy and was ennobled in 1734.

== Coats of arms ==
According to historical records and the main heraldic armorials, the family coats of arms of the various lines are articulated according to their cantonal seat:

- Thurgau / Bischofszell branch (TG):
  1. First variant: Azure, a snipe Or perched on a mount of three peaks Vert.
  2. Second variant: Gules, a stork contourny Argent [perched on a mount of three peaks Vert].
- Zurich branch (ZH): Gules, a wall embattled Argent on a terrace Vert, overall a lion Or supporting an inescutcheon Azure charged with a pair of compasses Or.
- Schaffhausen branch (SH): Gules, a star Or surmounted by an inverted crescent of the same.
- St. Gallen branch (SG):
  1. Vogt line:
    - Shield: Gyronny of eight Sable and Or; enté in point and per pale: 1st Argent, a mount of three peaks Vert; 2nd Or, a six-pointed star Sable surmounted by a figure of the same.
    - Helmet and Mantling: A grilled steel helmet, edged and buckled Or, with mantling Sable and Or.
    - Crest: A male bust proper, habited gyronny Sable and Or, wearing a torse Sable and Or with ribbons fluttering to the sinister.
  2. Kudermann line: Argent, a stork Or [or proper], supported by a mount of three peaks Vert.
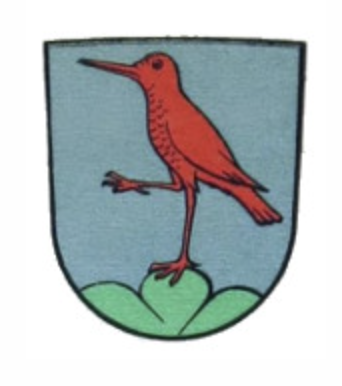
Coat of arms of the Rietmann of Bischofszell (Var. 1)

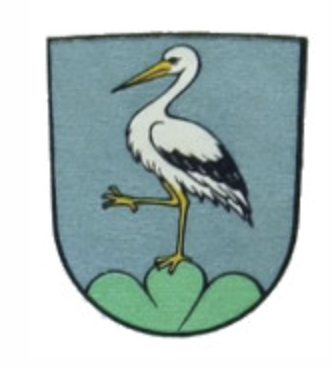
Coat of arms of the Rietmann of Bischofszell (Var. 2)

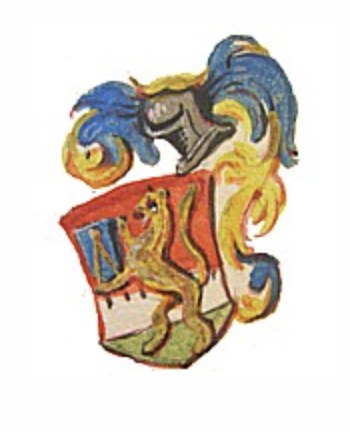
Coat of arms of the Rietmann of Zurich

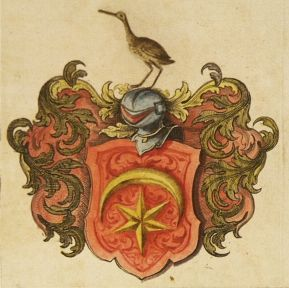
Coat of arms of the Rietmann of Schaffhausen

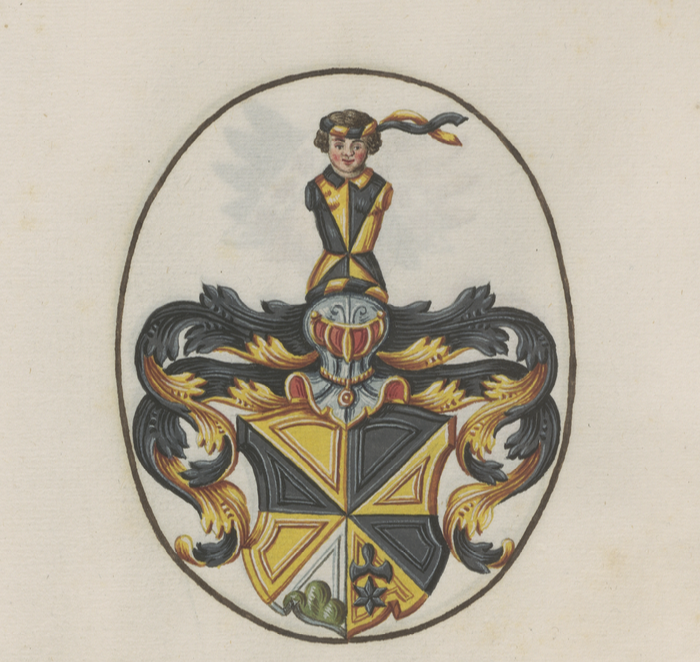
Coat of arms of the Rietmann of St. Gallen, Vogt branch

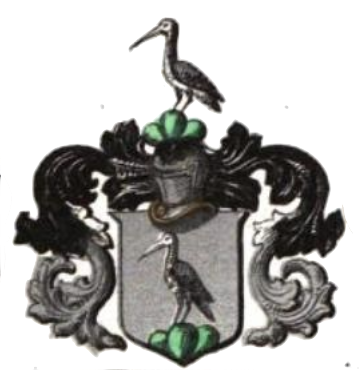
Coat of arms of the Rietmann of St. Gallen, Kudermann branch

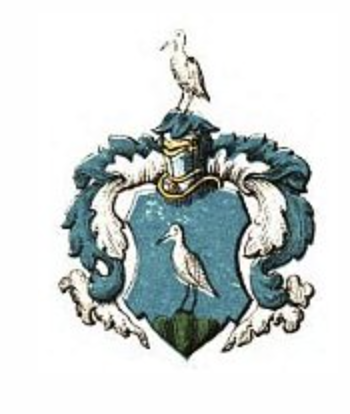
Coat of arms of the Rietmann of Winterthur

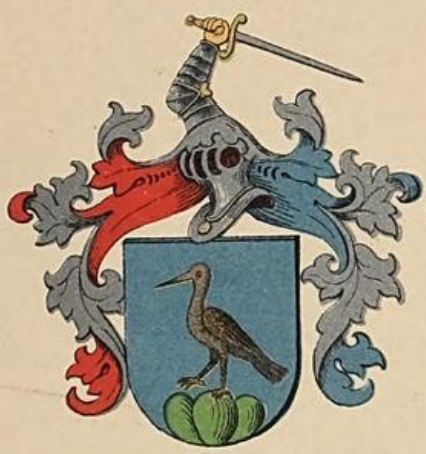
Coat of arms of the Rietmann of Basel

== Relations and marriages ==
Over the centuries, the Rietmann family of St. Gallen established ties with numerous prominent houses, consolidating social and political relations. Little is known of such ties for the other branches of the family.

- Zollikofer: Lords of Altenklingen. A Swiss patrician merchant family, ennobled in the Holy Roman Empire, which became one of the leading Reformed families in Eastern Switzerland. Members of the Notenstein.
- Zili (Zyli): A Swiss patrician merchant family from St. Gallen. The Zili became one of the wealthiest families in the city in the 15th century, forged alliances with the city's elites, played an important role in the Reformation and the Notenstein Society, and went on to found the bank Wegelin & Co.
- Bonzi: A noble Lombard family, Counts of the Serio of Crema, with whom the Rietmann established ties in modern times after settling in Milan.
- Högger: A family of Appenzell origin, known for the Höggersberg branch. In the 17th and 18th centuries, some members obtained noble titles in France and Sweden, founded banks, and held high diplomatic and military offices, also distinguishing themselves in the political life of St. Gallen. Members of the Notenstein.
- Huber: An ancient St. Gallen family, documented since the 14th century. Notable members include Uli Huber, who fell at Marignano (1515), and Ferdinand Fürchtegott Huber (1791–1863), a composer of great popularity in Switzerland. The family included mayors, clergymen, military officers and key figures in the city's cultural life.
- Scheitlin: A bourgeois family rooted in St. Gallen since the 16th century. It distinguished itself through prominent religious and academic figures, such as Peter Scheitlin (1779–1848), pastor and professor of philosophy and natural sciences, regarded as a reformer of the cultural and social life of St. Gallen.
- Locher: A family attested in St. Gallen as early as the 14th century, which prospered through trade and allied with prestigious houses such as the Högger. Some descendants founded charitable institutions, while others held prominent political, military and religious offices.

Other marriages connected the Rietmann family with the Wild, Tobler, Wettach, Alther, Rheiner, Scherrer, Dürrler, Ehrenzeller, Schlegel and Fehr families, further expanding the family's network of relations.

== Notable members ==
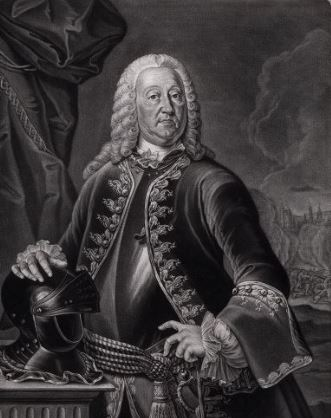
Johannes Rietmann (1679–1765)

- Hans Rietmann (15th century): town councillor (Ratsherr) of Bischofszell in 1417, the same year the family formally acquired citizenship rights (Verbürgerung) in the city. He is one of the earliest documented family members to hold public office there.
- Ulrich (Üli) Rietmann (15th century): Court Count Palatine (Pfalzgraf) under the Prince-Abbot of St. Gallen, Ulrich VIII. In 1421, he was granted lands and revenues in fief near Nieder-Arnegg by the Prince-Abbot.
- Heinrich Rietmann (died 1509): participant in the Swiss mercenary expedition to Naples in 1495. He was one of only four survivors among the 121 men from St. Gallen who set out.
- Heinrich Rietmann (died 1548): city judge (Stadtrichter) of St. Gallen, recorded in 1527.
- Heinrich Rietmann (died 1575): St. Gallen guild master (Zunftmeister) from 1550 until his death. He was communal judge (Gmeindrichter) from 1530 to 1532 and city judge (Stadtrichter) in 1539, 1543–1545 and 1550, in the first, second and third judicial seats. He was also fief-bearer (Lehenträger) from 1555 to 1575 and judge of fines (Bussenrichter) in 1567.
- Ulrich Rietmann (1531–1617): mayor of St. Gallen from 1597 to 1617. He held a series of municipal offices, serving as judge, magistrate, auditor and guild master. He was deputy mayor in 1597 and master of the arsenal from 1599 to 1606.
- Jacob Rietmann (1546–1629): St. Gallen guild master (Zunftmeister) from 1605 until his death. He was communal judge (Gmeindrichter) in 1569–1570, 1573–1574, 1587, 1589–1590 and 1592–1593, and city judge (Stadtrichter) from 1590 to 1604.
- Othmar Rietmann (1567–1632): St. Gallen guild master (Zunftmeister) from 1629 until his death. He was city judge (Stadtrichter) from 1606 to 1628.
- Benjamin Rietmann (c. 1570–1629): city treasurer (Seckelmeister) of Bischofszell. In 1585, he represented the Town Council before the Federal Diet (Tagsatzung) during the Zwinger dispute (Zwingerhandel). He also served as councillor (Altrat) in 1612 and town clerk (Stadtschreiber) in 1617.
- Othmar Rietmann (1589–1649): St. Gallen guild master (Zunftmeister), recorded in 1642.
- Jacob Rietmann (1589–1649): St. Gallen guild master (Zunftmeister) from 1638 to 1648.
- Heinrich Rietmann (1590–1637): St. Gallen guild master (Zunftmeister) from 1633 to 1637. In 1633, he became a member of the St. Gallen Society of Notenstein.
- Caspar Rietmann (1602–1656): St. Gallen guild master (Zunftmeister) from 1650 until his death. He was communal judge (Gmeindrichter) in 1646 and 1649, and city judge (Stadtrichter) in 1648–1649.
- Michael Rietmann (1610–1682): St. Gallen city treasurer (Stadtkassier) from 1667 to 1676. He was city judge (Stadtrichter) in 1655, guild master (Zunftmeister) in 1655–1656 and auditor (Rechenherr) in 1664–1665. He subsequently served as customs chairman (Zoll-Obmann) from 1665 to 1676, marriage judge (Eherichter) from 1672 to 1676 and fief-bearer (Lehenträger) from 1674 to 1676. In 1672, he was also judge of fines (Bussenrichter).
- Othmar Rietmann (1611–1648): St. Gallen guild master (Zunftmeister) from 1645 until his death in 1648. He was also judge of fines (Bussenrichter) until 1648. He died in Catalonia.
- Jakob Rietmann (1615–1670): known as Vogt, St. Gallen city judge (Stadtrichter) in 1650 and guild master (Zunftmeister) in 1655. In 1670, the entire Council of Banners of St. Gallen bestowed an honorary sword upon him in recognition of his merits.
- Michael Rietmann (1647–1726): wealthy merchant and city councillor of St. Gallen. He supported the schools of St. Gallen and served as treasurer.
- Caspar Rietmann (1656–1713): St. Gallen city judge (Stadtrichter) from 1693 to 1696. In 1696, he became guild master (Zunftmeister), an office from which he was dismissed in 1708. In the same year, he was also bread inspector (Brotschauer).
- Benjamin Rietmann (1665–1688): vice-ensign (Vorfendrich) in the company led by Captain General (Landshauptmann) Ob.... In 1688, he took part in the military operations of the Morean War within the Swiss contingent allied with the Republic of Venice, and fell in action during the siege of the fortress of Negroponte against the Ottoman Empire.
- Hermann Rietmann (1668–1704): ensign (Fendrich) in the army of the Duchy of Savoy, serving in the company commanded by Baron and Captain von Geroldingen.
- Hans Jacob Rietmann (1677–1756): mayor of St. Gallen from 1729 to 1756. He also served the city as judge, master of the weavers' guild, captain in the garrison troops, head of the Merchants' College, hospital administrator, deputy mayor (1725–1729), triennial mayor, imperial judicial officer and standard-bearer. Considered one of the most influential statesmen of the Republic of St. Gallen, he governed the city for twenty-seven years, distinguishing himself through a radical modernization of administrative and educational processes based on models of mercantile efficiency.
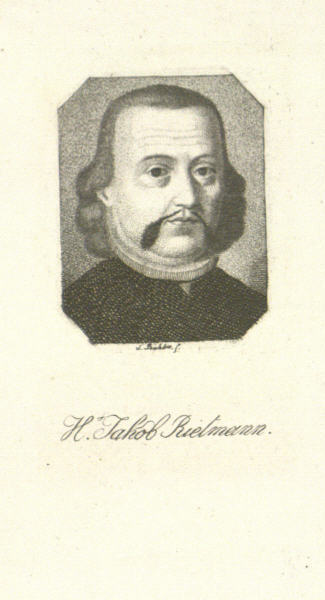
  Portrait of Hans Jakob Rietmann (1677–1756)
- Johannes Rietmann (1679–1765): general in Piedmontese service. He fought in the service of the Netherlands (1696–1703) and later of Piedmont (1703–1743), rising to the rank of field marshal by royal decree, thereby attaining the rank of general. He took part in the War of the Spanish Succession, the War of the Polish Succession and the War of the Austrian Succession. In 1734, he was ennobled by the King of Sardinia.
- Jacob Rietmann (1702–1782): St. Gallen militia officer, appointed Captain of the St. James district in 1754. His military career included the ranks of corporal, ensign (Fendrich) and lieutenant (1746). He also held civil or militia posts as sworn official (Geschworener) in 1733, master gunner (Constabler) in 1735 and judge (Richter) in 1743.
- Pancraz Rietmann (1706–1775): St. Gallen militia officer. He is recorded as corporal in 1741, master of the guard (Wachtmeister) in 1743, ensign (Fändrich) in 1746, and lieutenant in the St. James district in 1758. In 1767, he succeeded his brother Jacob Rietmann (1702–1782) as Captain of the St. James district.
- Hans Kaspar Rietmann (1717–1777): military chaplain in the French army with the Diesbach regiment, later French language teacher at the St. Gallen gymnasium, and then pastor of the French Church (1767–1775).
- Johannes Rietmann (“Trisch”) and his son Zacharias (died 1830): who gave their name to the inn and reading society “zum Trischli” in St. Gallen.
- Anthoni Rietmann (1748–1794): St. Gallen militia member. He held the ranks of vice-corporal and corporal (9th district) and master of the watch (Wachtmeister).
- Johann Jacob Rietmann (1757–1815): St. Gallen militia officer. He is recorded as grenadier captain (Grenadier-Capitain) in 1784 and as corporal in 1785.
- Tobias Rietmann (1762–1840): deputy governor (Unterstatthalter) of the canton of Säntis in 1799 during the Helvetic Republic. He was national agent (National-Agent) in 1798, district tax collector (Distriktseinnehmer) in 1800 and dispatch secretary (Expeditionssekretär) in 1818.
- Ulrich Rietmann (1782–1837): municipal clerk (Gemeindeschreiber) of St. Gallen in 1824–1825. He was archive secretary (Archivsekretär) in 1804, associate librarian (Collega Bibliothecae) in 1806 and secretary at the district office (Bezirksamt) in 1831.
- Michael Rietmann (1782–1862): judge and forest administrator of St. Gallen from 1819 to 1850. He made decisive contributions to the sustainable use of the city's municipal forests and remained on the forestry commission until his death.
- Daniel Rietmann (born 1790): St. Gallen postmaster (Posthalter).
- Karl Eduard Rietmann (born 1801): St. Gallen sharpshooter lieutenant (Scharfschützen-Lieutenant) and sharpshooters' master (Schützenmeister) in 1825, and sharpshooter first lieutenant in 1826. In 1837, he was a member of the administrative council (Verwaltungsrat).
- J. J. Rietmann-Brändli (1815–1867): Protestant pastor, active mainly in Lichtensteig. He was known for his originality of thought and literary vitality.
- Georg Karl Rietmann-Gruebler (1843–1899): entrepreneur who built his fortune in Galați, Romania, before returning to St. Gallen. He was a co-founder of the Schweizerische Unionbank of St. Gallen (merged into the Swiss Bank Corporation in 1896, now UBS), serving as its vice-president from 1891. He was appointed to the commercial board in 1888 and became its vice-president in 1895. He was also a key advocate for the construction of the Mühlegg funicular.
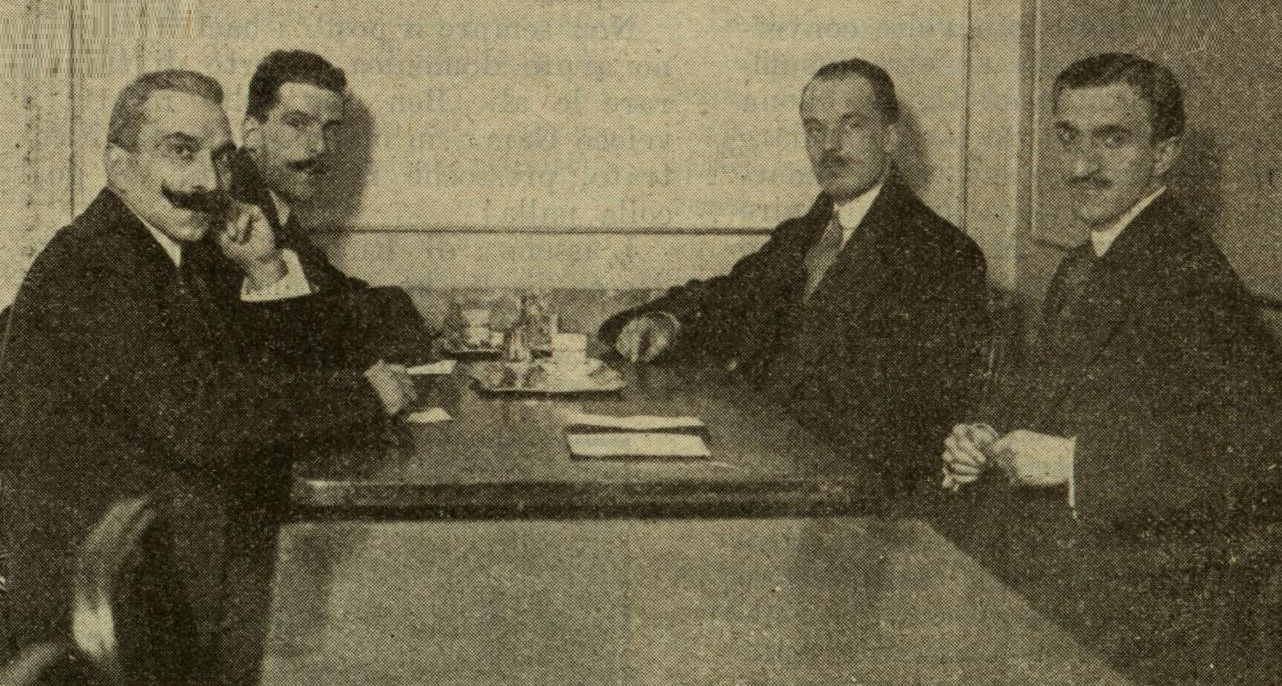
  Valvassori, Meazza, Rietmann and Scamoni (1913)
- Hugo Eugen Rietmann (1886–1959): Swiss-Italian textile entrepreneur, footballer, referee and coach. A midfielder, he was a co-founder of Inter Milan and, as a football referee, a co-founder of the A.I.A.. He was later a naturalized Italian coach.

== Related ==
- Caspar Zili
