= Glare =

GLARE, derived from Glass reinforced aluminium, is an advanced aerospace material.

Glare may also refer to:

== Music ==
- Glare (band), an American shoegaze band
- Glare (album), a 2001 album by Leo O'Kelly
- The Glare, 2009 album by British musicians Michael Nyman with David McAlmont
- "Glare", 2000 song by Japanese band Edge of Spirit
- "Glare", 2013 song by Japanese band Defspiral

== People ==
- Glare (surname), a list of people with the surname
- Gloor, family name from Aargau, Switzerland, also written as Glares, Glarer, Glaren, Glar, or Glaar

== Other ==
- Glare (vision), difficulty seeing in the presence of very bright light
- Glaring, a facial expression of squinted eyes and look of contempt
- A call collision in telecommunications

== See also ==
- Glair
- Glarus
