= Von Glarus =

The von Glarus is an old Swiss family of lower nobility (Knights) from Glarus in Switzerland.

== History ==
The family can be traced back to the 9th century. Until 1240 it was still found in the Castle of Sola in Glarus. In the middle of the 13th century it was first mentioned in Zurich. For more than three generations members of the family sat in the city council as knights of Glarus. The family went into two directions. The founders were Heinrich (first mentioned 1246) and his nephew Rudolf Ist (first mentioned 1250). They were vassals of the monastery of Fraumünster and owner of the preys of the church in Höngg above Zurich. Members of the Family married with other nobles, namely with „von Hünenberg“, von Vennen, „von Bürglen“, „von Windegg“, von Wetter-Tegerfelden“, von Landenberg and „von Liebegg“. The Tschudi family origins of the line from Johannes “von Glarus” (1280-1350) and Anna “von Landenberg“. At the same time Jakob married Katharina “von Liebegg“ and inherited the Liebegg Castle. In the year 1275 he was mentioned as Minister of Berchthold of Hallwyl, the local Baron and Sheriff. This line of the Knights of Glarus lost their fortunes and nobility. They became landowners and worked under the name of Glar, Glor, and Gloor as „Untervogt“ (Ministers) of the "von Hallwyl" for several centuries.
