= Swiss nobility =

Privileged social class in Switzerland

Switzerland, officially the Swiss Confederation, is a collection of semi-autonomous cantons. As membership of the confederation has fluctuated throughout history, each of these cantons has its own unique history and nobility. Typically, each canton had its own constitution, currency, jurisdiction, habits, customs, history, and nobility.

In the Middle Ages, various cantons had families with only local and, in the broad scheme of things, insignificant lands, whereas other cantons had ennobled families abroad. In Switzerland there were many families of dynasties who were members of the Holy Roman Empire. Other cantons had rulers from the House of Savoy, or from the ruling dynasty of the Kingdom of Burgundy. This diversity prevented the birth of a state with monarchical central authority.

As a general rule, Swiss nobility since the 14th century can be divided into three categories:

1. nobility acquired by inheritance, under the terms of family right;
2. nobility resulting from the ennoblement of a commoner, or from the creation of a new title for an existing noble;
3. nobility acquired by integration, as was the case in Reyff (1577) or Pontherose (1443). This integration was frequently due to a social event, or to alliances with noble families. Sometimes this was accompanied by the acquisition of a noble domain, for example when the seigniory of Mézières was bought by Jost Freitag in 1547, whereby Jost became a noble.

In Switzerland, where the social classes were historically closer than they were in other countries, there was neither a misalliance nor a loss of nobility due to a noble engaging in manual work or taking up a trade. This is why, for example, the noble Jean Gambach was able to be a manufacturer of scythes in 1442, and the noble Louis de Daguet was able to be a carter at the end of the 18th century. Individuals only lost their nobility due to illegitimacy or voluntary renunciation.

== Bern, Fribourg, Solothurn, Lucerne ==
From the 15th c. onwards, rising economic and political pressure from the city-states enticed more and more families of the traditional feudal nobility to seek membership in the higher echelons of the citizenry. These late-mediaeval urban upper classes were already composed of wealthy commoners (merchants, landowners, and craftspeople) but also of aristocrats from nearby fiefdoms or the descendants of ministeriales (i.e. knightly, originally unfree nobles in the service of ecclesiastical or secular fiefs). While a de jure distinction between noble and common patrician families was still upheld for some time, with quotas for certain government positions reserved for each group, these distinctions became de facto less and less rigid in the early modern era. Non-noble families could still be ennobled by letters patent, be it through the favour of foreign monarchs (most notably the kings of France) or by the cities themselves. For instance, in 1547 Bern set up the seigneurie of Batie-Beauregard as a barony for one Jacques Champion; in 1665 Solothurn granted letters of nobility to the brothers Marcacci of Locarno; in 1712 Bern created the seigneurie of Bercher for a member of the de Saussure family.

=== Bern ===
In Bern a constitutional law created in 1643 the privileged class of families eligible to Great Council membership. Since 1731 the Sovereign prohibits the use of titles of nobility conferred by foreign sovereigns; since 1761 patricians were authorised to be called wohledelgeboren; then on 9 April 1783 patricians were authorised to use the nobiliary particle "von" (or "de").

=== Fribourg ===
The city-state of Fribourg defined its patrician ruling class through the so-called Lettre des Deux-Cents in 1627, and closed their ranks to non-privileged families in 1684. Towards the end of the Ancien Régime, this aristocracy comprised four categories:

- titled noble families (Affry, Alt, Diesbach, Maillardoz, Castella de Berlens)
- untitled noble families (Boccard, Fégely de Vivy, Fivaz, Gléresse, Griset de Forel, Lenzbourg, Maillard, Praroman, of Prel, Reyff de Cugy, Reynold)
- patrician families of noble origin whose nobility is not taken into consideration by the state (Fégely de Prez, for example)
- patrician families of common origin (Buman, Castella, Reynold, Weck, Wild, etc.)

As defined in the constitution of 1404, members of the first two categories were barred from certain higher offices (banneret and secret, i.e. secret council) unless they renounced their noble privileges.

In 1782 the Sovereign of Fribourg decided to standardise the situation of these families. He removed all the titles except "noble", authorised all the patricians to use the nobiliary particle "de" (or "von"), and specified that henceforth the loads of "bannerets", "secrets" and "grand-sautier" would be opened to all the patricians. By confirming that all patrician families were noble either by origin or by being members of the privileged class, this "Règlement relativement à l'introduction de l'égalité des familles patriciennes et de leurs titulatures" (17 and 18 July 1782) is official confirmation of an existing status rather than a collective ennoblement.

=== Lucerne ===
In Lucerne at the end of the 17th century the patricians were named with the title "Junker" and regularly made use of their nobility when they were abroad, particularly when they served in the foreigner armies. Some families also received foreigner letters of nobility.

=== Solothurn ===
In Solothurn the patriciate in fact was formed gradually. Some families set up corporations to be able to control co-optation. So the capacity passed to a number of privileged families which then formed a noble patrician class whose members were qualified Herren und Bürger. Several of these families accepted letters of nobility abroad, particularly in France.

- Noble families of Bern:
  - von Erlach
  - von Graffenried
  - von Gunten
- Noble families of Fribourg
- Noble families of Solothurn
  - Arregger (von Wildensteg) (Alt. Aregger) († 1834)
  - Byss (Biso, Byso, Bysa) († 1836)
  - Besenval (von Brunnstatt) (Bösenwald) († 1927)
  - Glutz (Glutz von Blotzheim, Glutz-Ruchti)
  - Greder (von Wartenfels) († 1751)
  - Grimm (von Wartenfels) († 1856)
  - Kiefer (Kieffer, Küffer)
  - (von) Roll
  - vom Staal (von Staal, vom Stall) († 1787)
  - Surbeck
  - (von) Sury
  - (von) Tugginer
  - von Vigier (de Vigier, Vigier von Steinbrugg)
  - Wallier (Wallier von Wendelstorf) (Valier, Vallier) († 1887)
- Noble families of Lucerne

== Uri, Schwyz, Unterwald ==
In the cantons of Uri, Schwyz and Unterwald, the political evolution from the Middle Ages to the 19th century was realised in a relatively similar way, but did not lead to the constitution of a "patriciate" but rather to the formation of a relatively closed class of new families sharing political power with the ancient noble families. Some of the new families were ennobled abroad while others were incorporated to the nobility by "integration".

- Noble families of Uri:
  - von Attinghausen-Schweinsberg (freiherren, higher nobility; leading family of Uri in the 13/14th c.).
  - A number of local families were appointed meier (bailiffs) by the abbess of Fraumünster, the ruler of Uri, around the middle of the 13th century. These abbatial ministeriales grew more influential after the end of Attinghausen hegemony and are generally considered members of the lower nobility. They include the following families:
    - Niemirschin (bailiffs of Bürglen)
    - Schüpfer (related to the Niemirschin; bailiffs of Bürglen, at times landammanns of Uri)
    - Meier von Erstfeld (bailiffs of Erstfeld, at times eigenleute of Wettingen Abbey)
    - Meier von Silenen (perhaps related to the Schüpfer; bailiffs of Silenen ca. 1256–1370; originally from Urseren; later also ministeriales of the bishop of Sion, with Jost of Silenen ascending to the bishopric itself; influential patrician family in the city of Lucerne)
    - von Moos (bailiffs of Silenen after 1370; originally most likely ministeriales of Disentis in the Urseren valley; would later become an influential family of patricians and industrialists in the city of Lucerne; still extant)
- Noble families of Schwyz:
  - Reding von Bibberegg (ministeriales)
- Noble families of Unterwald:
  - Rudenz (ministeriales, originally from the Haslital)

== Zürich ==
In 1400 the city of Zürich formally became autonomous within the Holy Roman Empire. Before this date the only noble families were families of ministériaux. The corporations soon gained political power, while giving a dominant position to the noble corporation of the "Constaffel" in which was constituted a "noble chamber" called "adelige Stube zum Rüden Stübli". Membership of families in the Corporations was mainly hereditary.

The members of Stübli used the title "Junker". In 1798 the Stübli had eleven families. The Bonstetten family came to Bern in 1463 and ended in 1606. Some still extant families of the nobility of Zürich also received foreign titles, such as Hirzel, count, in France in 1788.

- Noble families of Zurich:
  - von Kyburg
  - Bonstetten
  - Brun
  - Bürkli
  - Daeschner
  - Escher vom Glas
  - Escher vom Luchs
  - Hirzel
  - von Jori
  - Kilchsperger
  - Landenberg
  - Manesse
  - Meiss
  - Meyer von Knonau
  - Mülner
  - von Orelli
  - Winterthur

== Schaffhausen, Zug ==
In the cantons of Schaffhausen and Zug, political power belonged to the corporations, so there was no real hereditary prerogative for government positions.

In the canton of Zug letters of nobility abroad awarded to a few families were extinguished. The very democratic system of this canton hindered expansion of the nobility.

In the canton of Schaffhausen noble families formed since the 13th century were members of the "Herrenstube", which became during the 15th century one of the twelve corporations. Some ancient families were extinguished and replaced in the "Herrenstube" by new families of the "integration nobility". In 1864 these families' last privilege was their right to be buried in the "Junkernfriedhof".

- Noble families of Schaffhausen
- Noble families of Zug

== Valais, Thurgau, Ticino ==
In the cantons of Valais, Thurgau and Ticino, the former noble families were maintained and only some families were ennobled abroad.

The "patriciat valaisan" which provides in particular the prince-bishops, was formed with families of old nobility but also with some families incorporated into the nobility either by possession of a right of jurisdiction or by membership via integration. Some of these families also accepted letters of nobility abroad. This patriciate was not a patriciate of right but in fact.

Ticino, before becoming a Swiss canton in 1803, did not form a political and administrative unit and there is thus no "nobility of Tessin" in a strict sense, however some noble families originate from this area. In Locarno, at the Reformation, two of the three great feudal families of capitanei: Muralto and Orelli emigrated to Zürich. A branch of Muralt was established in Bern. The third great family, Magoria, remained in Locarno. The majority of the families of Ticino ennobled abroad were it by the dukes of Milan.

- Noble families of Valais
- Noble families of Thurgau
- Noble families of Ticino

== Graubünden ==
In Graubünden there were a great number of families of dynasts and "ministériaux". From the 11th or 12th century, the dynasts owned seigniories on which they held power more in fact than by resulting of a constitutional law. These families maintained their privileges until the 15th century and some families preserved an important situation, in particular Salis and Planta, while some others were ennobles abroad.

In 1794 the Leagues enacted the radical cancelling of the nobility, titles and particles. This prohibition was confirmed in 1803 and 1848.

- Noble families of Graübunden:
  - Counts de Salis-Soglio (Vienna, 1748)
  - Comtes de Salis-Seewis (Versailles, 1777)

== Glarus, Appenzell ==
The canton of Glarus never had of nobility of right. However, in Glarus there are some families ennobled abroad.

In the cantons the families descended from the "State's chief" and from the bailiffs formed in fact a class of "integration nobility".

As for the canton of Appenzell Innerrhoden, there are known direct male decedents of the most elite noble Swiss family currently living abroad.

- Noble families of Glarus:
  - von Glarus
- Noble Families of Appenzell
  - von Sutter

== Aargau ==
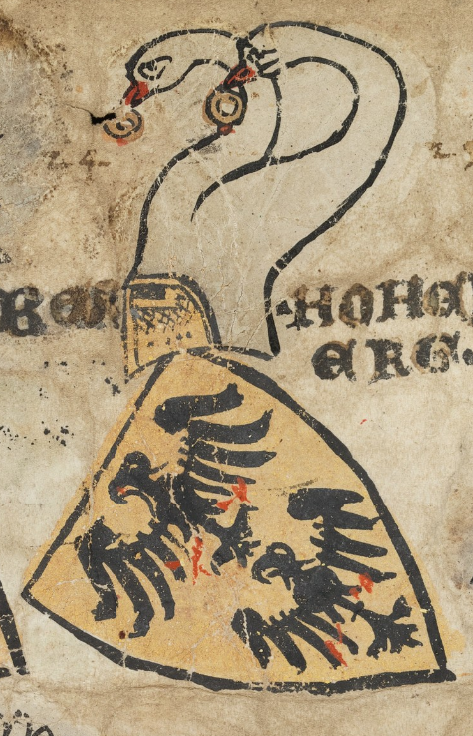
Coat of arms of Frohburg-Homberg, from the Zürich armorial

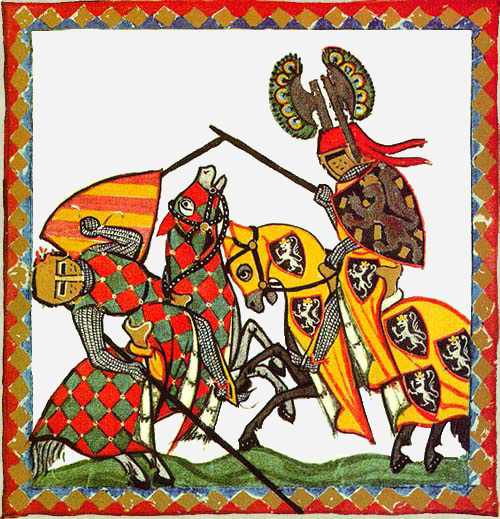
Lord Walther of Klingen, Codex Manesse folio 52r

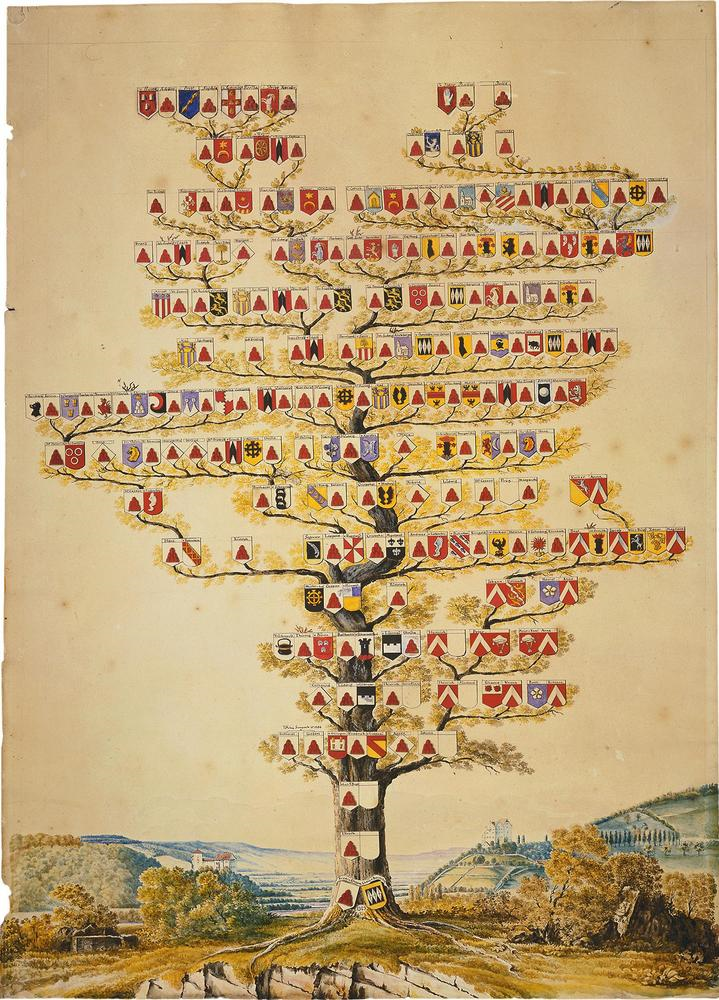
Family tree of the Effinger (1816), flanked by their castles of Wildegg (l.) and Wildenstein (r.)

The modern canton of Aargau was only created in 1789 under Napoleon, when the previously Austrian Fricktal was joined to the other districts that had been conquered by the Old Swiss Confederacy in 1415. The conquered territories were split into a Bernese area of influence in the west, a small district under the rule of Zürich in the very east, and two larger districts, the Freie Ämter ("free administration districts") and the County of Baden making up the eastern half of the canton. The governance of the latter two districts alternated between the individual member states of the Swiss Confederacy in the form of condominiums. With the house of Habsburg ousted, the Swiss states installed landvögte in several of the newly acquired castles, civil stateholders who wielded the legal and economic powers of the former feudal fief which they now administrated, for example in Lenzburg castle or in the Landvogteischloss (Governor's Castle) in Baden. In contrast, many of the smaller fiefs held by lower nobility (e.g. Hallwyl castle, owned by the family of its founders; or Habsburg castle itself, held at the time of the conquest by the ministerialis Wernher von Wohlen) continued into the new order and were not directly affected by it; several nobles, such as the lords of Reinach on Wildenstein castle, were officially enfeoffed by the conquering cantons, so that the only alteration in their title to the land was a change of liege lord, in this case from the counts of Habsburg to the city-state of Bern.

A number of comital families and other high-ranking nobles are attested in the time before the Swiss conquest:

Coat of arms	Family	Comments
	Counts of Lenzburg	Attested since the 10th century, died out in 1173; held extensive allodial lands in Aargau and several counties and Vogteien in the German and Italian-speaking parts of Switzerland; their inheritance was split between the counts of Kyburg and the counts of Habsburg in the presence of the emperor, Frederick I Barbarossa.
	Counts of Rheinfelden	Attested only during the 10th and 11th centuries as von Rheinfelden; they held lands around Rheinfelden and in the Oberaargau; their most prominent scion, Rudolf of Rheinfelden, was duke of Swabia and was elected king of the Holy Roman Empire by the papal faction during the Investiture Controversy; their Argovian holdings were inherited by the dukes of Zähringen, who died out in 1218. The Counts of Rheinfelden themselves were thought to have died out around 1090. However, after the investiture controversy they continued on as Counts in Rheinfelden, Wetterau (DE), Bubikon, and Rued with the family name of von Wetter and von Wetter-Tegerfelden. The family survives to this day.
	Counts of Habsburg	First attested in the 10th century, died out in the male line in 1740 but continues as the house of Habsburg-Lothringen to the present day; by the early 15th century, they had become one of the most prominent noble houses of Europe through marriage, purchase, and force; before the conquest of 1415, they owned all of Aargau except for Zofingen and Laufenburg, the latter of which belonged to their own cadet branch of Habsburg Laufenburg until their extinction in 1408.
	Counts of Frohburg	Attested since the 11th century, died out 1367; held lands in the northwest and southwest of the canton; founded Zofingen and Aarburg; split up into the branches Frohburg-Zofingen (†1307), Frohburg-Homberg (†1323), and Frohburg-Waldenburg (†1367); sold much of their land to the counts of Habsburg during the 14th century.
	Counts of Homberg and Thierstein	Attested since the 11th century and died out in the male line in 1223; held the counties of Frickgau and Sisgau; their line was continued by a branch of the Frohburg, which included the famous minnesänger Wernher von Homberg, who was a key figure in the prelude to the battle of Morgarten; the line died out in 1323 with his young son, Werner III of Homberg, and the Fricktal went to Habsburg.
	Freiherren of Tegerfelden	Attested since 1113; originally in the service of the dukes of Zähringen; Ulrich of Tegerfelden was abbot of St Gall from 1167 to 1199 and simultaneously Bishop of Chur from 1170 to 1179; Konrad of Tegerfelden was Bishop of Constance from 1208 to 1233. The house died out around the middle of the 13th century, but later a family of ministeriales in Habsburg services continued the name and, presumably, the fief. Though after the death of a Franz Ulrich of Tegerfelden in the battle of Sempach, which occurred in 1386, the family disappears from our records. The Tegerfelden's were a branch of the Conradines and were related to the von Wetters. After Johannus I von Wetter married the heiress Anna von Tegerfelden, he changed his family name to von Wetter-Tegerfelden.
	Freiherren of Klingen	Split into two branches in the early 13th century, with one branch retaining lands in Aargau and the other settling in Hohenklingen Castle near Stein am Rhein; the family founded the town of Klingnau and included the minnesänger Walther von Klingen; they died out in 1286, with most of their lands being joined to the county of Baden.
	Freiherren of Wessenberg	Attested since 1029; perhaps originally ministeriales of the female convent of Säckingen Abbey, they also held Leimental castle as a fief of the Bishops of Basel since the 14th century; liege men of the House of Habsburg, they continued to hold titles in Further Austria and were raised to the rank of Reichsfreiherren in 1681; still extant in Austria.
	Lords of Hallwil	Attested since the 12th century, probably as ministeriales of the counts of Lenzburg; later ministeriales of the counts of Kyburg, they possessed large landholdings around lake Hallwil by the late 14th century; though their castle was burnt during the conquest of 1415, the lords of Hallwil had it rebuilt shortly after; having attained comital rank in later times, the house is still extant today.
	Lords of Reinach	Attested since 1210; a branch of their family in Habsburg service settled in Sundgau and Alsace, where they were given the rank of Freiherr and held several prominent fiefs and offices; they sold their last titles in Switzerland by 1545; still extant.
	Lords of Rüssegg	Also Reussegg, named after a castle in Sins; owned rights and territories in Sins, Aettenschwil, and Auw, and had connections to various other noble families, including the lords of Reinach; in later generations citizens of Luzern. Rising to some prominence in the later 13th century (amongst others the imperial advocacy over Zürich), they were forced to sell their titles in 1429; extinct in the male line in 1483.
	Lords of Mülinen	First attested around 1280 as schultheißen of Brugg; ministeriales of the counts of Habsburg, they held a large number of fiefs in Aargau; they acquired Bernese citizenship in 1407 and slowly shifted the focus of their allegiance and marriages towards Bern, where they became an important family within the city's own aristocracy; with a number of important historical figures in recent generations, such as Helene von Mülinen, the family died out in the male line in 2018.
	(von) Effinger	Attested since the 14th century as citizens of Brugg; acquired a knighthood and a coat of arms in the late 15th century; holding several castle fiefs in Bernese territory, they became citizens of Bern and were established members of the city state's aristocracy by the 17th. century; died out in 1912.

== Vaud ==
The canton of Vaud, old county then country of Vaud, depended successively of Burgundy, Zähringen, Savoy until 1536, then of Bern. In this canton there were some feudal noble families, families of Savoyard nobility, families of the patrician nobility of Bern, and families of "integration nobility".

- Noble families of Vaud:
  - de Felice

== Neuchâtel ==
Originally seigneurs, the rulers Neuchâtel became counts in the late 13th century and assumed the rank of prince in 1618. Since the princes frequently ennobled their burghers as a reward for civil service, the Swiss Heraldic archives list more than a hundred aristocratic families with ties to the principality, most of them ennobled after 1500. Older families include Geneve, D'Arens, Dapifer, Du Donjon, or D'Estavayer.

== Geneva ==
Since the Reformation the Republic of Geneva did not officially recognise the nobility as an organised corps. There were families of old nobility, families of "integration nobility", families who were ennobled abroad, and a great number of noble families refuge at the time of the Reformation.

However, contrary to the generally accepted ideas, the Republic of Geneva made use of its capacity to ennoble. It is in particular what it did on 20 August 1680 by ennobling with a title of count the Noblet family.

== Basel ==
In 1382 the constitution reserved four seats of the Council for the noble families. From the next century the corporations and thus the town's citizens took the power. The noble families of this time preferred to leave Basel which consequently will have a corporative system. The nobility was then prohibited in Basel. An exception was made for the "barons Wieland" in 1816 under the condition that they will not use their title in Basel. However, there are some noble families whose nobility and titles are earlier to their reception as citizen of Basel.

The canton of Basel had in place of a nobility a patriciate called the Daig, that dominated its political life. Its most prominent members were the families Bernoulli, Burckhardt, Faesch, Iselin, Koechlin, Liechtenhan, Merian, Sarasin, Schlumberger, Vischer, and Von der Mühll.

== St. Gallen ==
The elite of the St. Gallen region fell into two distinct categories: the regional feudal nobility outside the city, and the urban patriciate within the Imperial Free City of St. Gallen (Reichsstadt St. Gallen).

=== Feudal landed nobility ===
Historically, the territory surrounding St. Gallen was dominated by the Prince-Abbey of St. Gallen, whose Prince-Abbot reigned as a territorial sovereign and prince of the Holy Roman Empire (Reichsfürst). The surrounding rural areas were governed by medieval dynastic families holding feudal fiefs:

- Counts of Toggenburg (Grafen von Toggenburg) – One of the most powerful noble houses in eastern Switzerland until their extinction in 1436.
- House of Rapperswil (Grafen von Rapperswil) – An influential feudal dynasty holding significant territory around Lake Zurich and the Linthebene.
- Lords of Sax (Freiherren von Sax) – A prominent feudal baronage with extensive territories in the Rhine Valley.

=== The urban patriciate ===
Following the Reformation, the City of St. Gallen was governed constitutionally as a guild republic (Zunftrepublik). The city's ruling social patriciate, the pool of governance-eligible families (regimentsfähige Familien), was composed of two overlapping civic groups:

1. The Notenstein Society (Gesellschaft zum Notenstein): Established in the 15th century as an exclusive patrician society (Adelige Stube zum Notenstein), this house comprised leading merchant-bankers, international traders, and diplomatic families.
2. The Guild Elite (Zunftbürgertum): Wealthy merchant dynasties enrolled in the city's trade guilds (particularly the textile weavers). Under the guild constitution, these non-titled merchant families held equal entitlement to .

These families occupied the major municipal, judicial, religious and military offices.

Prominent non-titled patrician families participating in city governance and the Notenstein included:

- Zili (or Zyli) – Active in the Notenstein since the 15th century. Although they held no formal noble title, they were key merchant-bankers whose descendants purchased the historic Haus zum Notenstein in 1801 (later housing Wegelin & Co. private bank).
- Högger – A major merchant house, ennobled in France and Sweden, that provided several burgomasters and councilors in the 17th and 18th centuries.
- Rietmann – A patrician family, ennobled by the House of Savoy, long active in guild leadership and city council chambers.

=== The 1778 codification of titled nobility ===
Over the centuries, several families within the Notenstein society sought to elevate their social standing internationally by obtaining formal patents of nobility (Adelsbriefe) from foreign monarchs, particularly the Holy Roman Emperor or the King of France.

In 1778, the Sovereign Council (Großer Rat) of St. Gallen formally recognized and codified seven specific Notenstein families that possessed validated foreign titles of nobility, establishing an official legal tier of titled city nobility (Stadtadel):

- Zollikofer von Altenklingen
- von Fels
- von Bernold
- von Watt
- von Hochreutiner
- von Görlitz
- von Specker

This 1778 decree specifically defined legal noble status; it did not disenfranchise the broader non-titled patrician families (such as Zili, Högger, or Rietmann) or the guild leadership, who continued to form the ruling civic oligarchy until the dissolution of the Old Swiss Confederacy in 1798.

The elite of the St. Gallen region fell into two distinct categories: the regional feudal nobility outside the city, and the urban patriciate within the Imperial Free City of St. Gallen (*Reichsstadt St. Gallen*).

== Current situation ==
The privileges of the nobility were gradually suspended after 1798, save for a revival in Lucerne and Freiburg during the Restoration from 1814 to 1831. Article 4 on equality of the 1848 Swiss federal constitution, finally made a legal end to the Swiss nobility. Nowadays the titles of nobility appear neither in registry offices nor in public instruments. Sometimes they are tolerated in administrative documents and in the noble's professional life, that is to say in social relations.

About 450 noble families are left in Switzerland, either Swiss or foreign. By counting 15 people per family about 1.06% of the population belongs to the nobility, which is comparable to the situation in France. There are large regional differences however: the canton of Appenzell for example has hardly any noble family left, while the canton of Vaud has over a hundred.

== See also ==
- Swiss bourgeoisie
- Bourgeoisie of Geneva
