= Glare (surname) =

Glare is a surname. Notable people with the surname include:

- Finley Glare (born 2003), Papua New Guinean rugby league player
- Kel Glare (born 1938), Australian police officer

== See also ==
- Glare (disambiguation)
