= Johannes Rietmann =

Johannes Rietmann Noble
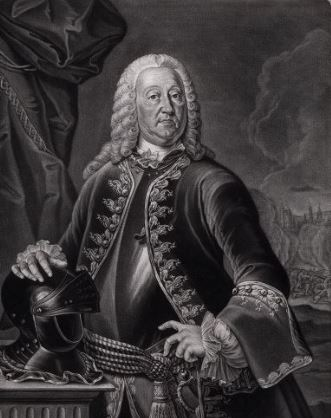
- Portrait by Johann Jacob Haid
- Born: 16 March 1679; Neunkirch, canton of Schaffhausen, Old Swiss Confederacy
- Died: 23 February 1765 (aged 85); Schaffhausen, Old Swiss Confederacy
- Spouse: Catharina Im Thurn (m. 1717)
- Military career
- Allegiance: Dutch Republic; Duchy of Savoy; Kingdom of Sardinia
- Branch: Infantry
- Service years: 1696–1743
- Rank: Maréchal de camp (major general)
- Unit: Rietmann Regiment (proprietary colonel from 1732)
- Commands: Rietmann Regiment
- Conflicts: War of the Spanish Succession; War of the Polish Succession; War of the Austrian Succession

Johannes Rietmann (Neunkirch, March 1679 – Schaffhausen, 23 February 1765) was a Swiss nobleman and general. Having reached the highest levels of the military hierarchy in the Kingdom of Sardinia as a Field Marshal (Maréchal de camp), he is considered one of the most successful and prestigious mercenaries from Schaffhausen in modern history. He belonged to the patrician Rietmann family.

Probably no one [from Schaffhausen] ever attained greater prestige and higher honours than Johannes Rietmann, whose rapid career [...] took him from simple soldier to General Field Marshal.

— Hans Ulrich Wipf

== Biography ==
=== Origins and family ===
A member of a distinguished patrician family from Schaffhausen originally from Bischofszell, Johannes was born in Neunkirch in March 1679 (his baptism is recorded on 16 March). He was the son of Heinrich Rietmann (1648–1722), a Reformed pastor and teacher who worked in Germany and several Swiss cantons, and Anna Dorothea Magirus († 1733), the daughter of a professor of mathematics and medicine from Marburg.

Of the couple's seven children, three pursued military careers abroad:

- Johann Heinrich (1676–1714), the eldest, served in Piedmont in the Hackbrett regiment.
- Hans Jacob (1689–1764), the youngest, also served the King of Sardinia, reaching the rank of lieutenant colonel in 1749.
- Johannes, who achieved the most distinguished career among the brothers.

=== Early career in the Netherlands (1696–1703) ===
In 1696, at the age of 17, Johannes entered the Bernese Muralt regiment as a cadet in the service of the Dutch Republic. Under the command of Captain Stokar, he was promoted to ensign (Fahnenjunker) on 20 February 1702. He resigned from Dutch service at the end of 1703 to enter the service of the House of Savoy during the War of the Spanish Succession.

=== Career in the Duchy of Savoy ===
Joining the de la Reine regiment as a Capitaine Lieutenant in February 1704, he participated actively in the crucial phases of the conflict in Italy:

- Siege of Verrua (1704–1705): He distinguished himself in the defense of the fortress against French troops.
- Defense of Nice (1705–1706): During the fighting at the Castle of Nice, he was seriously wounded in the left arm by a cannonball.
- Subsequent campaigns: Appointed captain of the grenadiers in 1707, he took part in the Siege of Toulon and, in 1708, the assault on La Pérouse Castle near Pinerolo, where he was wounded again.

Following the Treaty of Utrecht (1713), he was promoted to Major en second in the Hackbrett regiment.

=== Command and the "Regiment Rietmann" ===
During the years of peace, Rietmann rose through the hierarchy: Major en titre in 1725 and Lieutenant Colonel in 1730. In 1731, he was sent to Alghero, Sardinia, as the military commander. Upon the death of Colonel Johann Simeon Bellmont, Rietmann was promoted to Colonel (21 December 1731) and granted ownership of the regiment, which was renamed the "Regiment Rietmann" (21 March 1732).

During the War of the Polish Succession (1733–1738), he led his regiment with honor at the Battle of Parma (29 June 1734) and participated in the surrender of Guastalla. For his merits, he was promoted to Brigadier (1735) and appointed commander of the fortress of Como. On 28 April 1737, he received the rank of Field Marshal (Maréchal de camp), the peak of his career.

=== Later years and retirement ===
He participated in the campaign against Modena and Mirandola (1742) during the War of the Austrian Succession. On 5 January 1743, plagued by persistent health problems, he left active service. King Charles Emmanuel III of Sardinia, who had already ennobled him in 1734, granted him a life pension of 6,000 livres.

Returning to Schaffhausen after forty years of service, he lived in a quiet and respected retirement. In 1727, he had purchased the late-Baroque palace Zum Thiergarten on the Cathedral Square, which he expanded in 1737. In 1743, he also acquired the country estate Generalengut in the Mühlental.

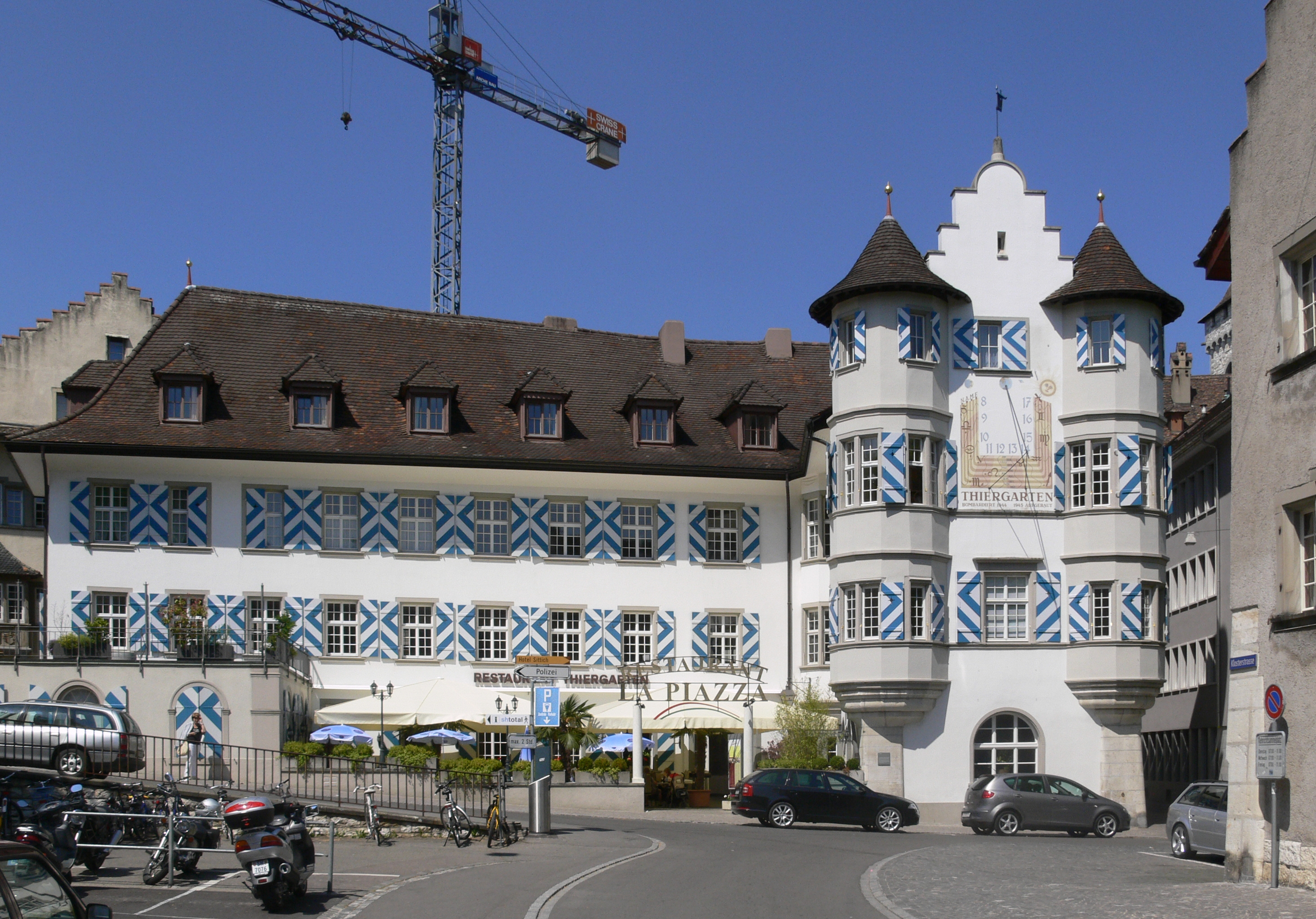
Zum Thiergarten, Schaffhausen, Switzerland.

He died on 23 February 1765 from catarrhal fever. The military funeral held three days later reflected the immense prestige he held among his fellow citizens.

=== Personal life and estate ===
In 1717, he married Catharina Im Thurn (1682–1760), but the marriage remained childless. Johannes Rietmann was the last and most illustrious representative of his line.

Rietmann accumulated an extraordinary fortune. His inventory included vast amounts of capital in guilders, valuable wine reserves, silver, and jewelry. In his 15-page will, he allocated significant funds to charitable institutions, religious foundations, and the poor of Schaffhausen.

== Honours ==
- Ennobled in the Kingdom of Sardinia (1734).

== See also ==
- Battle of Guastalla
- Schaffhausen
- Swiss mercenaries
