= Jori family =

The Jori family (or von Jori) is the name of an old Swiss noble family of Zürich.

== History ==
The origin of the name is uncertain: perhaps from "valvassores majores". The first mentions of this family of Reichsfreiherren (Barons of the Holy Roman Empire) are from the year 1069 (under Emperor Henry IV).

== Literature ==
- Niklaus Flüeler, Marianne Flüeler-Grauwiler (Hrsg.): Geschichte des Kantons Zürich. 3 volumes, Werd, Zürich 1994–1996. ISBN 3-85932-158-7.
- Zürich. in: Historisch-Biographisches Lexikon der Schweiz. volume 7. Neuenburg 1934.
- Paul Kläui, Eduard Imhof: Atlas zur Geschichte des Kantons Zürich 1351–1951. 2nd edition, Orell Füssli, Zürich 1951.
- Thomas Lau: Kleine Geschichte Zürichs, Pustet, Regensburg 2012, ISBN 978-3-7917-2418-8.
- Kleine Zürcher Verfassungsgeschichte 1218–2000. Published Staatsarchiv des Kantons Zürich on behalf of the Direktion der Justiz und des Innern at the day of the formation of the Zürcher Verfassungsrat September 13, 2000. Chronos, Zürich 2000, ISBN 978-3-905314-03-8.
- Zürich. in: Lexikon des Mittelalters. volume 9, columns 710–712. Metzler, Stuttgart 1999, ISBN 3-476-01742-7.
- Alois Niederstätter: Der alte Zürichkrieg. Böhlau, Wien 1995, ISBN 3-205-05595-0.
- Staatsarchiv des Kantons Zürich (Hrsg.): Zürcher Dokumente. Texte und Bilder aus dem Staatsarchiv. Orell Füssli, Zürich 1984, ISBN 3-280-01556-1.
- Sigmund Widmer: Zürich. Eine Kulturgeschichte. 13 volumes. Artemis, Zürich 1975–1986, ISBN 3-7608-0399-7.
- Thomas Zotz: Turegum nobilissimum Sueviae oppidum. Zürich als salischer Pfalzort auf karolingischer Basis. in: Frühmittelalterliche Studien. de Gruyter, Berlin 2002, S. 337–354, ISSN 0071-9706.
