= Patriciate (Old Swiss Confederacy) =

Class of families in medieval Europe

Civic patriciate (Italian: patriziato cittadino; German: Patriziat; French: patriciat) refers, by analogy with ancient Rome, to a class of families (patricians) in medieval and early modern Europe who, by birth, status or custom, monopolised seats on city councils and the highest offices of urban administration. In the Middle Ages, groups of notable families of varied origin, nobles who had acquired burgher rights, lower ministerial nobility, and wealthy commoner merchants, asserted in many European cities an autonomous dominion that generally clashed with the interests of monarchs and emerging territorial states (for example in France, Italy and the Holy Roman Empire). Within civic and republican polities the civic patriciate remained, up to the nineteenth century, a typical product of elite formation; in monarchies, at the level of the central state, comparable phenomena are not observed.

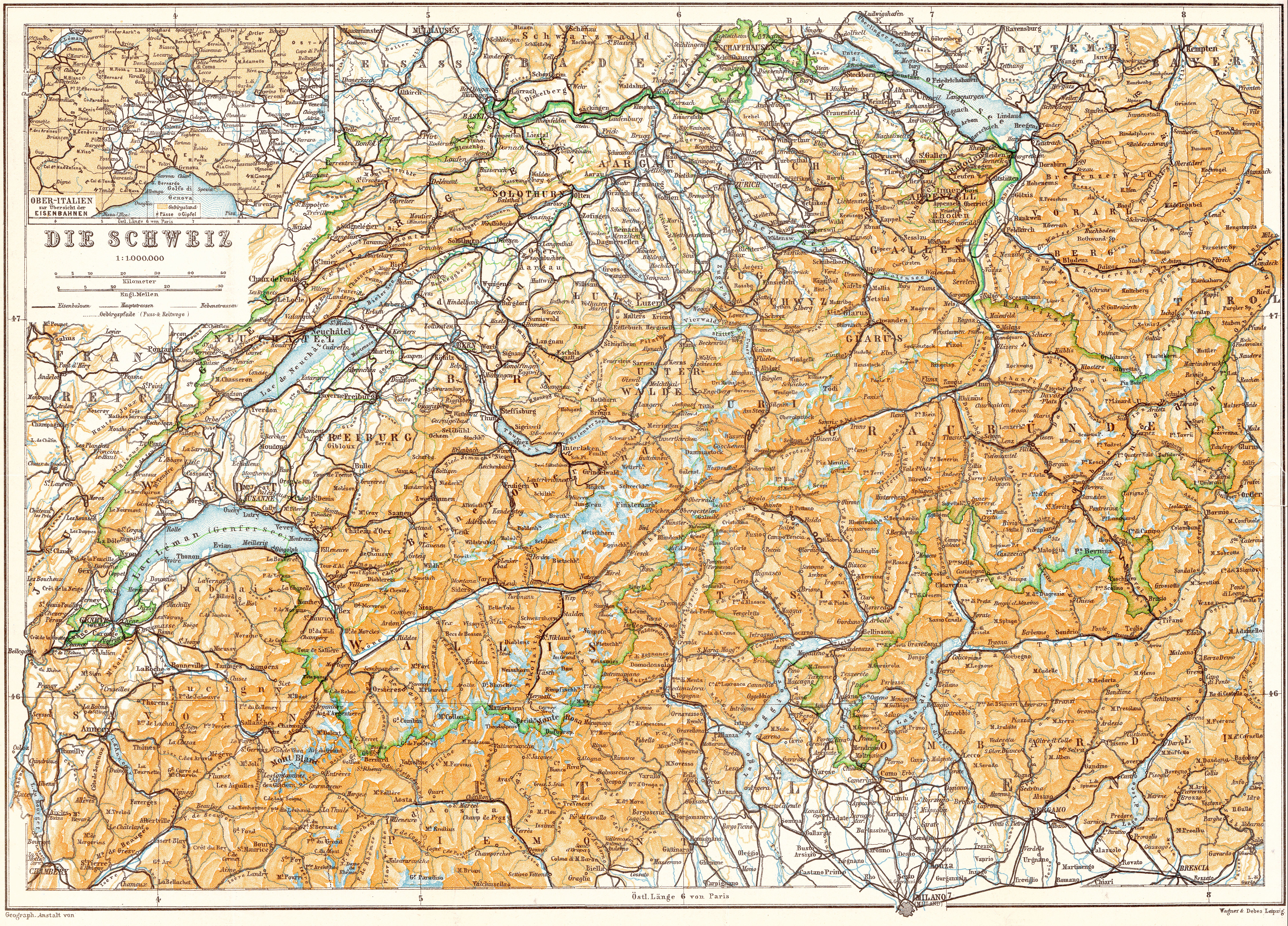
Switzerland.

Access to urban government by members of the bourgeoisie, originally merchants and artisans, presupposed that they were no longer compelled to work for a living. Having enriched themselves, some burghers lived on investment income and imitated the nobility, adopting an aristocratic conception of honour which, while acknowledging bourgeois values such as esteem for work, professional skill and efficiency, distinguished the civic patriciate from artisans or mere property owners. At the same time, ministerialis families and nobles, by integrating into the civic patriciate, could engage in commercial and financial activity.

During the late Middle Ages, the civic patriciate tended to become a hereditary estate and to close itself off—juridically and ideologically (aristocratisation). In practice, however, some families could still gain access until restrictions on the right of citizenship were tightened in the sixteenth century, and sometimes even thereafter. The elites of cities with aristocratic constitutions were replenished by co-optation, regardless of noble titles conferred by the emperor. The civic patriciate considered itself predestined to exercise power by the grace of God, an ideology that masked actual power relations. Alongside terms such as Häupter (supreme magistrates) or Ehrbarkeit ("honourable persons") used in German-speaking areas, the expression patriciate (German Patriziat, French patriciat)—employed by its own members—spread from the late sixteenth century in German-speaking Switzerland and from the early seventeenth century in Romandy, becoming progressively established in the seventeenth and eighteenth centuries. In Ticino, by contrast, patriziato denotes the comune patriziale, the legal successor of the former vicinanza from the end of the Ancien Régime.

Not to be confused with the Bürgergemeinde. A statutory corporation in public law in Switzerland which includes all individuals who are citizens of the Bürgergemeinde.

== Developments in the Middle Ages ==
On the territory of the future Swiss Confederation, down to the later fourteenth century power lay in the hands of houses of the high and lower nobility. Thus an initial civic patriciate formed, open to up-and-coming individuals and new arrivals in the cities. In Zurich, this group comprised about 80 families, 35 of which entered between 1250 and 1300. Urban communities generally sought to integrate nobles from the surrounding countryside, admitting them as external burghers or compelling them to reside in town.

Boundaries between social groups were fluid. Nobles and burghers intermarried. Political domination rested on actual power, not on legal privileges. A burgher family that adopted a noble lifestyle and acquired a seigneurial lordship was considered noble after 30–50 years. In Bern there was no official definition of nobility and no offices reserved to nobles. A distinction between "old" and "recent" families corresponds more closely to historical reality than a strict divide between nobles and burghers. Economic ups and downs, war mortality and natural extinction produced major fluctuations; only exceptionally did patrician families retain their social position over several generations.

Although in principle still open and evolving, from the thirteenth century to the Reformation the civic patriciate was involved in numerous urban revolts, sometimes with far-reaching consequences. In Zurich, the Brun Revolution (1336) excluded from government the burgher notable families that had hitherto dominated and vested power in the guilds. In Bern comparable attempts failed, and from the late thirteenth century the guilds were banned from political activity. Neither the Twingherrenstreit (1470–71) nor the election of the butcher Peter Kistler as Schultheiss—arising from the political marginalisation of part of the citizenry, endangered the predominance of the civic patriciate.

Local elites were not immune to epidemics and natural disasters. The 1356 Basel earthquake destroyed 60 towers owned by ministerial families, who were ruined rebuilding them, an event that favoured the rise of merchant families.

From the second half of the fifteenth century most patrician families owed their social position—often maintained for several generations—to political or military roles in their cities' expansion or internal consolidation. Public offices were not yet completely controlled by a few families, but the dominant houses increasingly rarely lost council seats.

== Consolidation in the early modern period ==
Around 1500 the civic patriciate succeeded in distinguishing itself from the classes of artisans and small property owners and became a hereditary estate. The end of the Confederation's expansionism and the treaties of 1516 and 1521 with France (regulating mercenary service and pensions) removed some causes of popular revolts and reduced for ruling families the risk of dying out on the battlefield. On this basis the patriciate consolidated, devoting itself to politics and public administration, which offered ever more desirable posts due to state-building and the need to govern subject lands, common bailiwicks and, in the Reformed cantons, secularised church property. Bailiffships, foreign pensions, diplomatic missions, financial operations and military entrepreneurship constituted the main income sources of the civic patriciate.

Development varied according to local economic and political contexts. In the aristocratic cantons (Bern, Fribourg, Solothurn and Lucerne) closed forms of patriciate prevailed: its members, active in administration and in mercenary service, based their existence on monopolised public offices. In these places the last artisan families disappeared from the councils in the seventeenth century. The few newcomers admitted to the ruling estate were not artisans but came from finance, the military and administration.

In the corporate cities of Basel, Zurich, Schaffhausen and St. Gallen, where, under political compromises, part of the councils were elected by the guilds or co-opted from within them, where the Reformation had banned or restricted for decades foreign service, and where commerce and industry held greater weight, artisans and other up-and-coming figures were never completely excluded from councils. Where trade and putting-out industry (Verlagssystem) prospered, entrepreneurs in textiles, watchmaking and finance enjoyed solid social standing. In Geneva and Zurich, Huguenot and Locarno religious refugees contributed to economic development. If in the sixteenth century they were integrated into local society, and in Zurich some even entered government by the first or second generation, this ceased to happen in the following century.

Among merchant-dominated cities, Zurich alone possessed a relatively extensive territory. As in aristocratic cities, Zurich's elite also sought to control rural areas. Some entrepreneurial families gradually withdrew from economic activity, lived off landed rents and undertook political or military careers. Landed and merchant families intermarried until they formed a single upper class, which in the eighteenth century comprised about a quarter of the citizenry. In the seventeenth and eighteenth centuries the roles accorded to guilds slowed aristocratisation in Zurich, Schaffhausen and St. Gallen, which nonetheless saw the development of an elite that, if not de iure then de facto, can be qualified as a civic patriciate.

To consolidate their status, civic patricians imitated noble lifestyles. They obtained foreign noble titles and coats of arms, compiled family chronicles celebrating origins and exploits, purchased castles and lordships, founded charitable trusts and entails, and surrounded themselves with luxury goods and cultural artefacts. To distinguish themselves from ordinary citizens they gathered in exclusive societies and corporations, sometimes analogous to noble associations: the Konstaffel and Stübli in Zurich; the Guild of the Key in Basel; in Bern, the noble society zum Narren und Distelzwang, the guilds designating the standard-bearers (butchers, bakers, smiths and tanners) and the society zum Mittellöwen.

In private life, patrician families ensured that resources, reputation and government offices passed from one generation to the next. They sought marriages suited to their rank and planned their descendants' destinies by dividing roles to optimise inheritance. They promoted careers for their members but demanded in exchange renunciation of individual self-realisation. From the sixteenth century the Abbeys of Saint Gall and Einsiedeln received their younger sons.

Worldly ease, aptitude for command and broad social networks were important resources for those who aspired to notability. Although they aimed to hold public office, acquiring formal legal expertise seemed secondary. Patrician families did invest in education—sons studied at foreign universities—but placed greater value on residence at royal courts or training in the army. For many houses, mercenary service, military careers and pensions provided not only income but also an education in command and cosmopolitan comportment.

The patriciate's position nevertheless remained vulnerable. Discontent among subjects produced peasant uprisings, culminating in the Peasants' War of 1653, which highlighted the difficulties and limits of patrician power. Lacking a standing army and compelled to compromise with their subjects, patricians developed costly forms of legitimation such as distributing necessities, paternalist solicitude toward disadvantaged regions and groups, and ostentatious modesty (pre-imposed by sumptuary laws) meant to conceal their wealth.

Conflicts also arose with enfranchised citizens excluded from government offices to which they were entitled (Basel's state crisis of 1691, creation of a State Commission in 1681, Geneva's eighteenth-century revolutions). Widespread abuses—such as allocating public posts via prior agreements or outright venality of offices—provoked further discontent; prohibitions or allocation by lot proved ineffective remedies.

In the eighteenth century some patricians cultivated more open sociability; in Bern, their salons adopted courtly models—especially in gendered role division—more than bourgeois-republican traditions. Members favourable to Enlightenment ideas supported projects of modernisation advanced by economic and patriotic associations. Yet the patriciate's capacity for self-reform was too limited to translate Enlightenment demands into political change.

== Nineteenth and twentieth centuries ==
Patricians lost power following the invasion of the Confederation in 1798 and recovered it with the Act of Mediation (1803). In Basel and Zurich they retained dominance until the 1870s–80s. In Bern they maintained control of the cantonal capital, while the rest of the canton passed to the liberals in 1831.

In the second half of the nineteenth century the civic patriciate gradually merged with the bourgeoisie, in forms that varied by city. Bern's patriciate—composed largely of landowners and officials—found it harder to adapt to change than the ruling classes of Basel and Zurich, better prepared for modernity by their traditional activities (textiles, international trade, banking). Conflicts with other social groups shaped Bernese politics until the reorganisation of the patrimonial commune in 1888. Despite some opening to the high bourgeoisie, patrician families mostly married among themselves, forming a stratum marked by dense kinship ties.

Social origin retained importance into the twentieth century. Modelling themselves on medieval nobility, the old elites, conscious of their family origins, refused to admit new members and preserved sociocultural dominance until the First World War. Names, kinship, language, gestures, material culture and family history remained traditional symbols. Ancient associations retained their allure, as part of the bourgeoisie aspired to perpetuate patrician lifestyles. Recent studies have shown the persistence of an opposition between old and new elites. At the start of the twenty-first century Bern still had networks formed and financed by descendants of patrician families, notably the Burgergemeinde.

== See also ==
- Patrician (post-Roman Europe)
- Old Swiss Confederacy
- Guild
- Burgergemeinde
- Bourgeoisie
- Ancien Régime
- Helvetic Republic
- Co-optation
- Ministerialis

== Bibliography ==
- P. Guyer, "Politische Führungsschichten der Stadt Zürich vom 13. bis 18. Jahrhundert", in Deutsches Patriziat 1430–1740, ed. H. Rössler, 1968, pp. 395–417.
- K. Messmer; P. Hoppe, Luzerner Patriziat, 1976, pp. 1–28.
- H. C. Peyer, Verfassung.
- F. de Capitani, Adel, Bürger und Zünfte im Bern des 15. Jahrhunderts, 1982.
- Braun, Ancien Régime.
- E. Isenmann, Die deutsche Stadt im Spätmittelalter, 1250–1500, 1988.
- P. Barbey, État et gouvernement: les sources et les thèmes du discours politique du patriciat genevois entre 1700 et 1770, 1990.
- P. Sarasin, Stadt der Bürger, 1990 (1997²).
- D. Hiler, "Le patriciat dans tous ses états", in Sociétés et cabinets de lecture entre Lumières et romantisme, 1995, pp. 125–143.
- A. Tanner, Arbeitsame Patrioten – wohlanständige Damen, 1995.
- P. Henry, "Patriciat neuchâtelois, traditions familiales et service étranger", in Gente ferocissima, ed. N. Furrer et al., 1997, pp. 137–148.
- B. Schnegg, "Von der Zunftstube zur Salongesellschaft", in Geselligkeit und Gesellschaft im Barockzeitalter, ed. W. Adam, 1997, pp. 353–363.
- D. Schläppi, "In allem Übrigen werden sich die Gesandten zu verhalten wissen", 1998.
- R. Gerber, Gott ist Burger zu Bern, 2001.
- D. Schläppi, Die Zunftgesellschaft zu Schmieden in Bern zwischen Tradition und Moderne, 2001.
- K. Rieder, Netzwerke des Konservatismus, 2008.
- M. Schnyder, Tra nord e sud delle Alpi, PhD thesis, Florence, 2008.

== Attribution ==
This article is based on the Italian entry Patriziato cittadino by Daniel Schläppi, translated by Valerio Ferloni (version dated 27 September 2010).
