= Mühleggbahn =

Funicular in St. Gallen, Switzerland

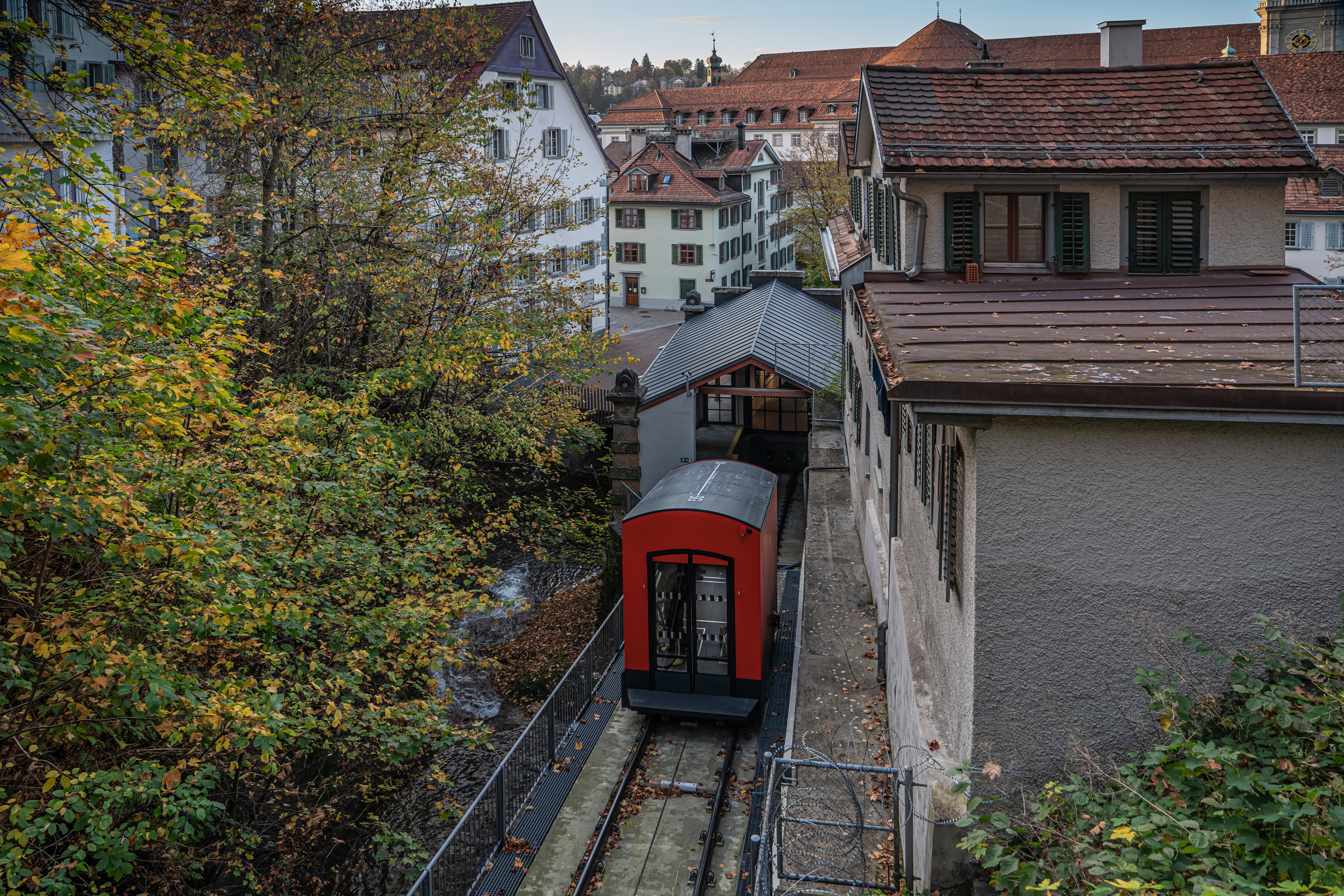
- Car at upper station

Overview
- Other name(s): Standseilbahn St. Gallen-Mühlegg; Drahtseilbahn St. Gallen-Mühleck
- Status: In operation
- Owner: Mühleggbahn AG
- Locale: St. Gallen, Switzerland
- Termini: "St. Gallen, Mühlegg Talstation" at Mühlenstrasse; "St. Gallen, Mühlegg" at St. Georgen-Strasse 43
- Stations: 2
- Website: muehleggbahn.ch

Service
- Type: Funicular (inclined elevator since 1975)
- Route number: 2710 (earlier: 1710, 115c)
- Operator(s): Verkehrsbetriebe St. Gallen (since 1953)
- Rolling stock: 1 for 38 passengers (since 2018); 1 for 30 (2004-2018); 1 (1975-2004); 1 for 60 (1950-1975); 2 (1893-1949)

History
- Opened: 14 December 1893 (131 years ago)
- Concession: 1889
- Rack-railway: 1950-1975
- Enhancements: 2004, 2018

Technical
- Number of tracks: 1 (with passing loop before 1949)
- Track gauge: 1,200 mm (3 ft 11 1/4 in)
- Electrification: 1975 as funicular, 1949 as rack railway (1893-1949: water counterbalancing)
- Highest elevation: 747 m (2,451 ft)
- Maximum incline: 22.8%

Mühleggbahn is a funicular in the city of St. Gallen, Switzerland. It leads from a lower station south of the old town, near the abbey, at 676 metres (2,218 ft), to Mühlegg at 474 metres (1,555 ft) in St. Georgen. (Note: notes 673 m and 742 m (1999)) The line is 323 metres (1,060 ft) long and functions as an inclined elevator with a single car, and 287 metres (942 ft) in a tunnel. The trip takes about 90 seconds.

The funicular is owned by "Mühleggbahn AG" and operated by Verkehrsbetriebe St. Gallen.

== History ==
When opened in 1893, the line worked as a water counterbalancing funicular with two cars and a passing loop. Water was drawn from Mühleggweiher at its upper station.

The system was replaced in 1950 with a rack railway that operated until 1975.

On 7 May 1975, it was reopened as a funicular. The car was replaced in 2004 and 2018, tracks in 2018.

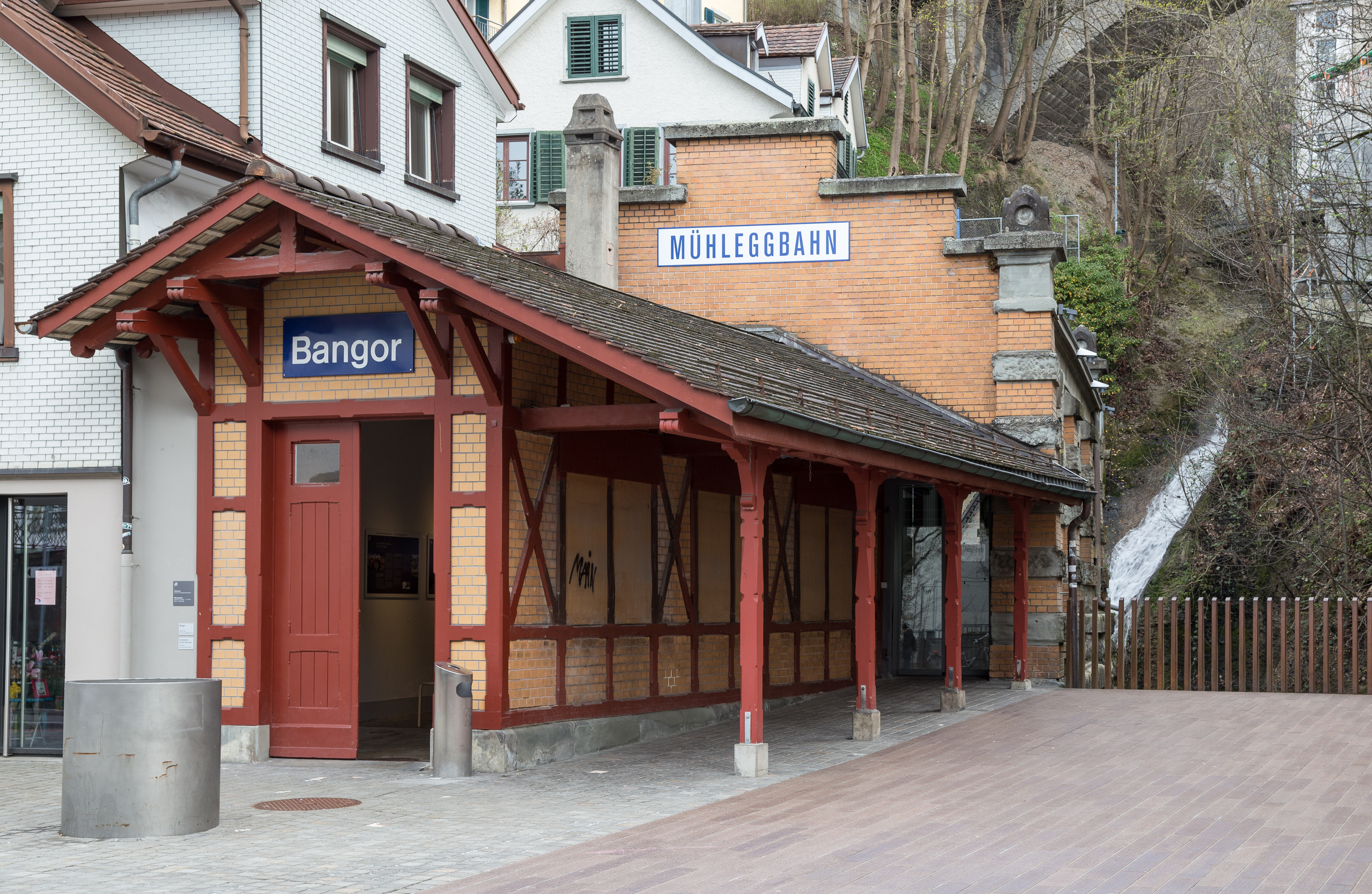
Lower station with sign "Bangor" (2017)

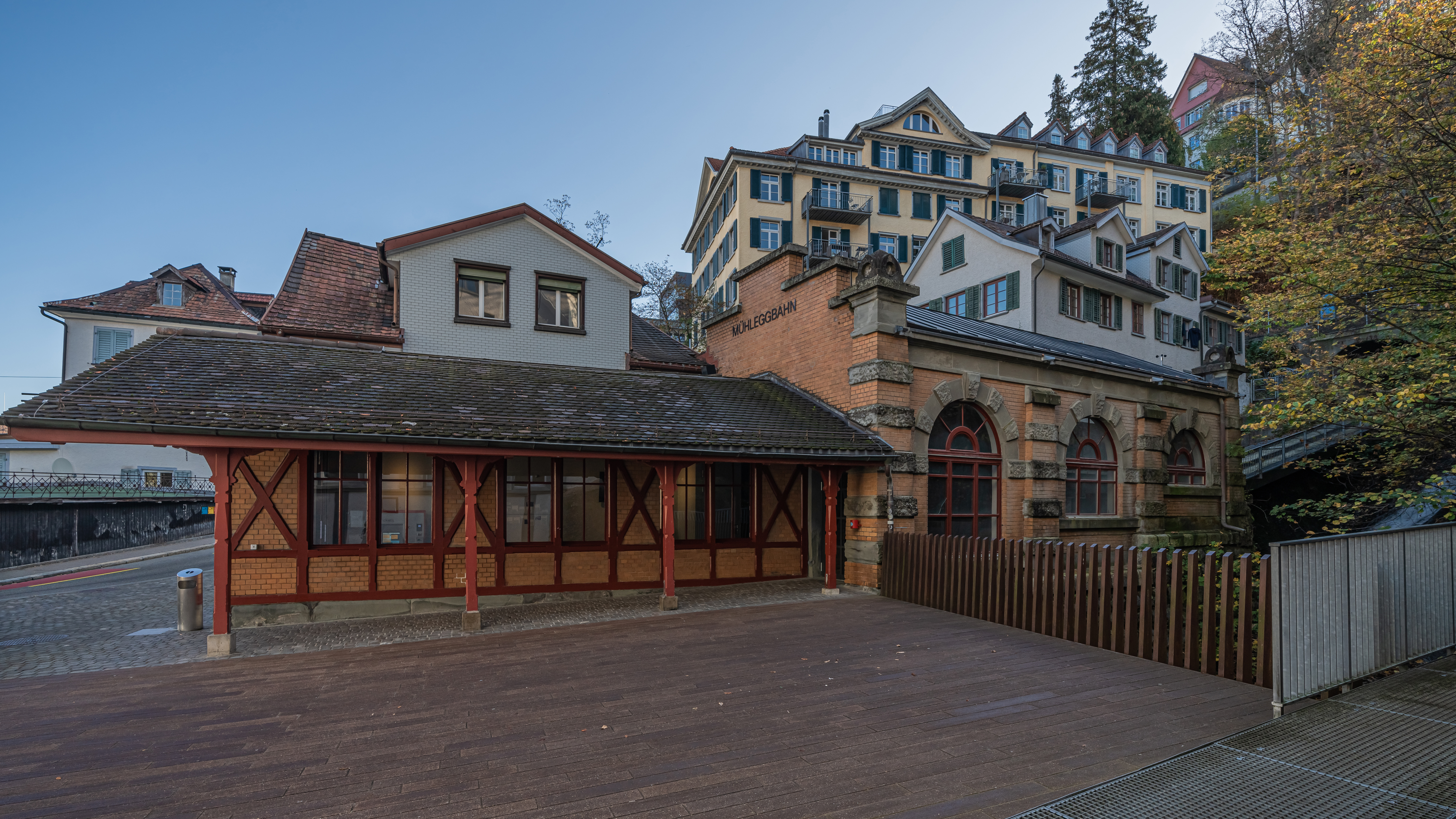
Lower station (2022)

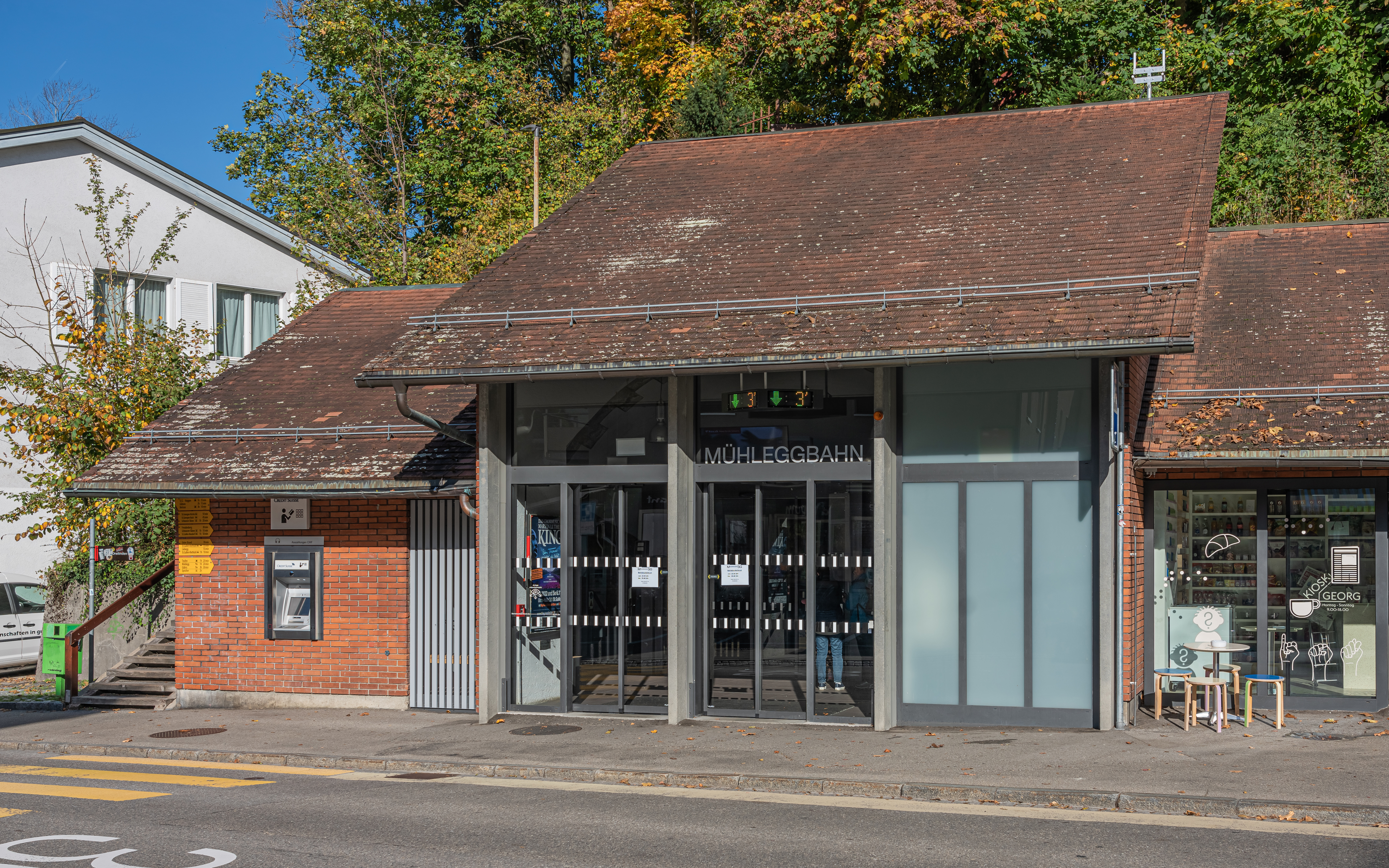
Upper station (2022)

== Description ==
The Mühleggbahn is a funicular with one car which connects the two stations in a fully automatic trip every five minutes. If the car is not at the station, it can be requested with a button. Most of the 316 meter long route goes through a tunnel with a gradient of 208 to 228 per mile. The elevator pulls the car at a maximum speed of 4.8 meters per second with a maximum of 38 passengers. The travel time is approximately 90 seconds.
