= Honorary weapon =

Honorary award for distinguished military service

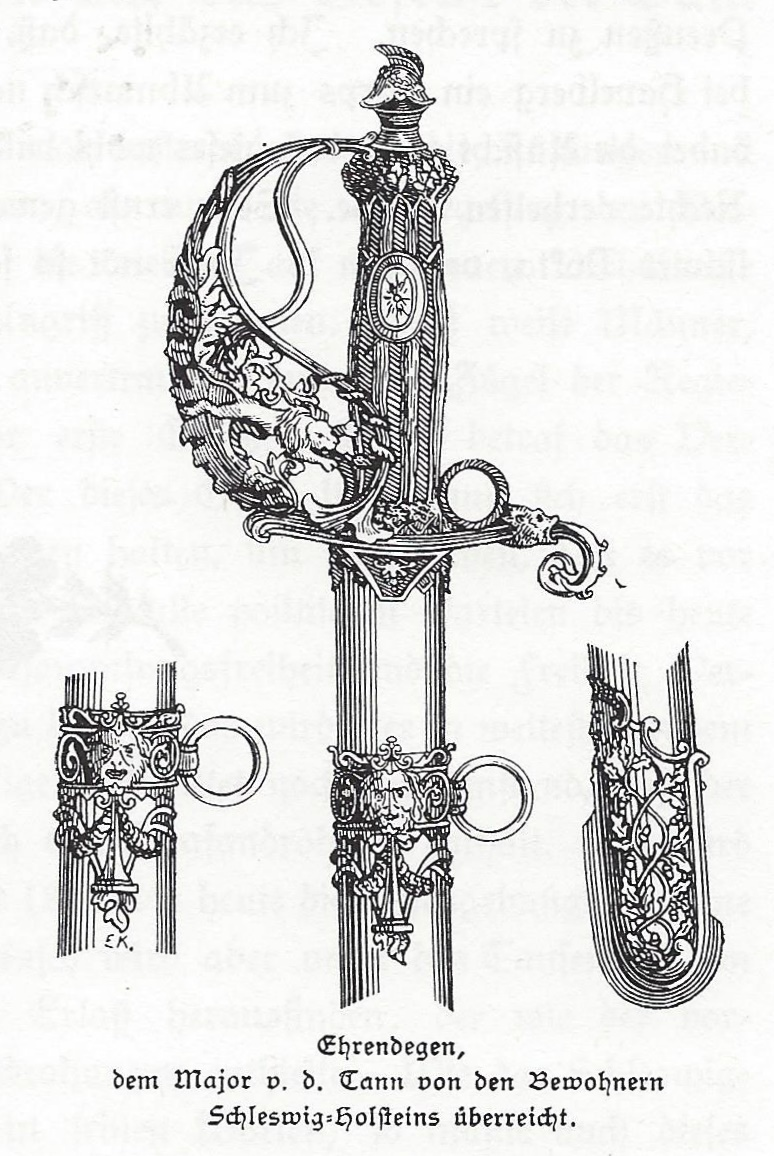
Drawing of the honorary sword, which the people of Schleswig-Holstein gave to Major Ludwig von der Tann-Rathsamhausen, the leader of the Schleswig-Holstein Freikorps.

Honorary weapon (also known as "award weapon" or "gift weapon") is a personalized type of weapon that is an honorary award (or gift) for specially distinguished military personnel for their military exploits and merits. An award weapon can be a "cold weapon" or a firearm: a sword, a sabre, a broadsword, a saber, a dagger, a revolver, a pistol, a rifle, a hunting rifle, etc. Usually, on such a weapon, in addition to the appropriate inscription about the distinct merits in which the person might be attributed to (whether that is your name; a special design; or other culturally significant traits.) is the reason why an award weapon is often called a personalized weapon. The personalized details are on the weapon itself or on a metal plate (made of gold, silver, brass, or other metals) attached to the weapon, scabbard, or holster.

== Categories ==
According to Abramzon, award and gift weapons can be divided into five groups, primarily depending on the reasons for presenting the weapon:

- Award weapons of the 17th and 18th centuries;
- Grant weapons of the 18th century;
- Award weapons with the inscription "For Bravery" of the 18th and 19th centuries;
- Prize weapons (cold and firearms) of the 19th century;
- Grant weapons (cold, firearms and defensive) of the 16th and 19th centuries.

Durov divides award weapons into two categories:

- Weapons given for military merit to officers and generals of the Russian regular army and navy;
- Weapons for servicemen of irregular troops.

== By country ==
=== Argentine ===
Officers of the Argentine Armed Forces may be awarded a bladed weapon (sabre or rapier).

=== Georgia ===
In accordance with the legislation, since May 2003, an award weapon is a weapon transferred in the manner established by the legislation of Georgia by an authorized official to an individual as an incentive for special services to the state, as well as service or combat merit or sporting achievements.

=== Kazakhstan ===
The awarding of weapons is provided for by law.

=== Kyrgyzstan ===
According to the legislation of Kyrgyzstan, award weapons include a dagger, saber, pistol or hunting firearm. Award weapons can be presented only once.

According to the report of the State Committee for National Security of Kyrgyzstan, from 1991 to April 2010 it issued 80 units of award weapons, the abolished State Security Service issued 48 units, and the Kyrgyz State Border Guard Service issued another 48 units. In 2010–2011, 16 units of weapons were issued. In January 2016, 1,313 units of award firearms were registered in the country.

Award weapons can be received by both citizens of the country and foreigners. In the period from 2005 to 2010 alone, more than 350 Russian citizens were awarded award weapons from the Ministry of Internal Affairs of Kyrgyzstan.

=== North Korea ===
There are known cases of award weapons being presented (for example, on July 27, 2017, a group of Korean People's Army officers were awarded 9-mm Paektusan pistols) and gift weapons (on April 25, 2019, a traditional Korean sword was presented to Russian president Vladimir Putin) On other occasion, during Day of Victory in the Great Fatherland Liberation War celebrations, Kim Jong-un handed out honorary pistols to high-ranking generals.

=== Russia ===
Russia has history of awarding honorary weapons dating to the Russian Empire. In modern Russia the legal basis for awarding honorary weapon is laid in the federal law on Weapons.

=== Spain ===
There are known cases of awarding and gift weapons. Thus, the Spanish King Alfonso XIII presented the President of Ecuador, José María Velasco Ibarra with a specially made Astra Pistola de 9m/m Modelo 1921 pistol (serial number 0401) with gold engraving. In 1956, another "Astra Cub" pistol with gold engraving was made as a gift from the Spanish government to the President of the United States D. Eisenhower.

=== Ukraine ===
In April 1995, the decree of the President of Ukraine approved the state award "Nominal Firearm", which was the Fort-12 pistol in an award version (made of alloy steel, decorated with engraving and silvering, with grip overlays made of valuable wood). Subsequently, regulatory documents were adopted that provide the opportunity to award firearms of other systems:

Thus, in September 1999, a regulation was adopted on the departmental insignia of the Ministry of Defense of Ukraine, which can be "a pistol (except for pistols of the Fort-12 and Fort-14 models), a revolver, a hunting firearm, a sabre, a broadsword or a dirk". On January 15, 2018, it was established that only military personnel of the armed forces and other state security agencies of Ukraine can be awarded, the award is given once and the award is not issued again

After the Orange Revolution, from February 2, 2005 to October 14, 2006, the Minister of Internal Affairs of Ukraine, Yuriy Lutsenko awarded 157 people with Fort combat pistols with the inscription "To the Hero of the Orange Revolution"; in addition, on the initiative of the Governor of the Vinnytsia Oblast, Oleksandr Dombrovskyi, NPO Fort manufactured a batch of 1,000 gold-plated gift traumatic pistols based on the Fort-17R design with the inscriptions "Yes!" and "I believe! I know! We can!" as souvenirs for the ideological inspirers and heroes of the revolution on the Maidan.

In January 2008, the regulation on the departmental insignia of the Security Service of Ukraine was approved, which may be "a pistol, a sabre of the established model, and a dagger of the established model"

In March 2008, the Ministry of Internal Affairs of Ukraine introduced a departmental insignia – the dagger "Cossack Glory" (the first awards were held at the same time); In May 2010, a new version of the regulation on the departmental insignia of the Ministry of Internal Affairs of Ukraine was approved, which provides for the possibility of awarding "cold arms and firearms"

In the summer of 2009, the regulation on the departmental insignia of the State Service of Communications and Information Protection of Ukraine was approved, which may be "a Nagant revolver, TT, PM, Fort-12, Fort-14, Fort-17 pistols, a Margolin pistol, a sabre of the established model and a dirk of the established model"

In October 2012, a new regulation on the departmental insignia of the Ministry of Defense of Ukraine was adopted, which may be "a pistol, revolver, hunting firearm, sabre, broadsword or dirk". In August 2010, the Minister of Internal Affairs of Ukraine, Anatolii Mohyliov reported that in 2009, 226 people were awarded personalized weapons, and in the first half of 2010, another 33 people were awarded. As of the beginning of 2013, according to official data from the Ministry of Internal Affairs of Ukraine, there were 3,310 personalized pistols in Ukraine.

The awarding continued in the future. In total, according to the Ukrainian Association of Gun Owners, from 1992 to mid-October 2016, over 40,000 units of award firearms were presented to citizens of Ukraine.

== See also ==
- Ceremonial weapon
- Art Institute of Chicago – which has examples of honorary weapon and ceremonial weapons
