= Gloor =

Gloor is a family name which may refer to:

- Cyrill Gloor (born 1982), Swiss footballer
- Danny Gloor (born 1952), Canadian former ice hockey player
- Fabian Gloor (born 2002), Cuban footballer
- Kurt Gloor (1942–1997), Swiss film director, screenwriter and producer
- Mike Gloor (born 1950), American politician
- René Gloor (born 1956), Swiss retired long jumper
- Simon Gloor (born 1997), Swiss curler
